= Andy Warhol's Velvet Underground Featuring Nico =

Andy Warhol's Velvet Underground featuring Nico

Compilation album by the Velvet Underground and Nico
- Released: November 1971
- Genres: Art rock; experimental rock; psychedelic rock; proto-punk
- Length: 86:16
- Label: MGM Records

The Velvet Underground chronology
Loaded (1970)	Andy Warhol's Velvet Underground featuring Nico (1971)	Squeeze (1973)

Nico chronology
Desertshore (1970)	Andy Warhol's Velvet Underground featuring Nico (1971)	June 1, 1974 (1974)

Singles from Andy Warhol's Velvet Underground featuring Nico
- 1. "I'm Waiting For The Man" Released: 1971

Andy Warhol's Velvet Underground featuring Nico is a compilation album of the Velvet Underground released by MGM Records in 1971 that features selections from the band's first three studio albums. Originally released as a double LP, the cover artwork and inside gatefold sleeve feature imitations of Andy Warhol's paintings of Coca-Cola bottles, but are credited to other artists on the back sleeve of the album. The album was released in the UK to capitalise on the interest from Warhol's Pork.

== Track listing ==
All songs written by Lou Reed unless otherwise noted.

Disc 1

Side one
No.	Title	Length
1.	"I'm Waiting for the Man" (from The Velvet Underground & Nico, 1967)	4:37
2.	"Candy Says" (from The Velvet Underground, 1969)	4:09
3.	"Run, Run, Run" (from The Velvet Underground & Nico, 1967)	4:18
4.	"White Light/White Heat" (from White Light/White Heat, 1968)	2:44
5.	"All Tomorrow's Parties" (from The Velvet Underground & Nico, 1967)	5:55

Side two
No.	Title	Writer(s)	Length
1.	"Sunday Morning" (from The Velvet Underground & Nico, 1967)	Reed; John Cale	2:53
2.	"I Heard Her Call My Name" (from White Light/White Heat, 1968)		4:05
3.	"Femme Fatale" (from The Velvet Underground & Nico, 1967)		2:35
4.	"Heroin" (from The Velvet Underground & Nico, 1967)		7:05
5.	"Here She Comes Now" (from White Light/White Heat, 1968)	Reed; Cale; Sterling Morrison; Maureen Tucker	2:00
6.	"There She Goes Again" (from The Velvet Underground & Nico, 1967)		2:30

Disc 2

Side one
No.	Title	Writer(s)	Length
1.	"Sister Ray" (from White Light/White Heat, 1968)	Reed; Morrison; Cale; Tucker	17:00
2.	"Venus in Furs" (from The Velvet Underground & Nico, 1967)		5:07

Side two
No.	Title	Writer(s)	Length
1.	"European Son" (from The Velvet Underground & Nico, 1967)	Reed; Cale; Morrison; Tucker	7:40
2.	"Pale Blue Eyes" (from The Velvet Underground, 1969)		5:40
3.	"The Black Angel's Death Song" (from The Velvet Underground & Nico, 1967)	Reed; Cale	3:10
4.	"Beginning to See the Light" (from The Velvet Underground, 1969)		4:48

Professional ratings
Review scores
Source	Rating
Allmusic	link
The Encyclopedia of Popular Music	4/5 stars
MusicBrainz	link

== Personnel ==
Adapted from liner notes:

The Velvet Underground

- Lou Reed - vocals, guitar, piano
- John Cale - vocals, electric viola, organ, bass guitar
- Sterling Morrison - vocals, guitar, bass guitar
- Maureen Tucker - percussion

Note: Doug Yule is not credited, although he provides lead vocals on "Candy Says", as well as bass guitar on "Pale Blue Eyes" and "Beginning to See the Light", as he replaced John Cale on the band's third album. Original pressings of the album misspell Sterling Morrison's name as "Stirling Morrison".

Production

- Illustration, Design, Art Direction – Grahame Berney, Keith Davis, Oliver Wade
- Liner Notes – Russ Curry
