= Peel Slowly and See =

Box set by the Velvet Underground
- Released: September 26, 1995
- Recorded: July 1965 – August 23, 1970
- Genres: Rock; proto-punk
- Length: 379:34
- Label: Polydor
- Producers: Geoff Haslam; Shel Kagan; The Velvet Underground; Andy Warhol; Tom Wilson

The Velvet Underground chronology
Live MCMXCIII (1993)	Peel Slowly and See (1995)	Loaded (Fully Loaded Edition) (1997)

Professional ratings
Review scores
Source	Rating
AllMusic	5/5 stars
The Encyclopedia of Popular Music	5/5 stars
Rolling Stone	5/5 stars

Peel Slowly and See is a five-disc box set of material by the Velvet Underground. It was released in September 1995 by Polydor.

== Compilation ==
The name of this box set comes from the instruction presented on vinyl copies of the band's debut album to peel back the banana sticker featured on the cover. The set includes all four studio albums by the Lou Reed-era line-ups of the Velvet Underground, alongside demo recordings and live performances, some of which had been previously bootlegged, and some of which had never before been released. Squeeze, recorded after Reed's departure from the band, is not included. The Velvet Underground, the band's self-titled third album, uses the "closet mix", Lou Reed's mix of the album that gives more emphasis to the vocals, and was the mix used on the original release. The band's fourth album, Loaded, is presented with "full-length versions" of three of its tracks, "Sweet Jane", "Rock & Roll" and "New Age".

Rolling Stone journalist David Fricke wrote extensive liner notes in an accompanying booklet, which also pictured many items of Velvet Underground memorabilia from the collection of guitarist Sterling Morrison.

== Track listing ==
All tracks performed by the Velvet Underground except † by the Velvet Underground & Nico; and ‡ by Nico.

All tracks are written by Lou Reed, except as noted.

Disc one: July 1965 demos, all previously unreleased
No.	Title	Writer(s)	Length
1.	"Venus in Furs" (demo) "Take 1" "Take 2" "Take 3, incomplete" "Take 4"		15:33; 5:05; 4:51; 0:28; 5:12
2.	"Prominent Men" (demo)	Lou Reed, John Cale	4:53
3.	"Heroin" (demo) "Take 1" "Take 3, incomplete" "Take 4, incomplete" "Take 5"		13:34; 5:19; 1:36; 1:37; 5:03
4.	"I'm Waiting for the Man" (demo) "Take 1, incomplete" "Take 2" "Take 3"		9:50; 1:30; 3:46; 4:35
5.	"Wrap Your Troubles in Dreams" (demo) "Take 1, incomplete" "Take 2" "Takes 3–10, incomplete" "Take 11, incomplete" "Take 12"		15:50; 0:50; 6:37; 2:15; 0:43; 6:08
6.	"All Tomorrow's Parties" (demo) "Take 1, false start, incomplete" "Take 2, false start, incomplete" "Take 3" "Take 4" "Take 6, incomplete" "Take 7, false starts" "Take 7" "Take 8" "Take 10, incomplete" "Take 11"		18:26; 1:22; 1:08; 2:33; 2:35; 1:43; 0:28; 2:45; 2:27; 0:53; 2:33
Total length:			78:55

Disc two
No.	Title	Writer(s)	Original release	Length
1.	"All Tomorrow's Parties" (single version†)		Single A-side	2:49
2.	"Sunday Morning†"	Reed, Cale	The Velvet Underground & Nico	2:54
3.	"I'm Waiting for the Man"		The Velvet Underground & Nico	4:38
4.	"Femme Fatale†"		The Velvet Underground & Nico	2:37
5.	"Venus in Furs"		The Velvet Underground & Nico	5:10
6.	"Run Run Run"		The Velvet Underground & Nico	4:19
7.	"All Tomorrow's Parties†"		The Velvet Underground & Nico	5:58
8.	"Heroin"		The Velvet Underground & Nico	7:10
9.	"There She Goes Again"		The Velvet Underground & Nico	2:39
10.	"I'll Be Your Mirror†"		The Velvet Underground & Nico	2:12
11.	"The Black Angel's Death Song"	Reed, Cale	The Velvet Underground & Nico	3:12
12.	"European Son"	Reed, Cale, Morrison, Tucker	The Velvet Underground & Nico	7:47
13.	"Melody Laughter" (live edit†)	Reed, Cale, Morrison, Tucker, Päffgen	Previously unreleased	10:43
14.	"It Was a Pleasure Then‡"	Reed, Cale, Päffgen	Chelsea Girl	8:02
15.	"Chelsea Girls‡"	Reed, Morrison	Chelsea Girl	7:24
Total length:				78:05

Disc three
No.	Title	Writer(s)	Original release	Length
1.	"There is No Reason" (demo)	Reed, Cale	Previously unreleased	2:12
2.	"Sheltered Life" (demo)		Previously unreleased	2:52
3.	"It's All Right (The Way That You Live)" (demo)	Reed, Cale	Previously unreleased	2:48
4.	"I'm Not Too Sorry (Now That You're Gone)" (demo)	Reed, Cale	Previously unreleased	2:17
5.	"Here She Comes Now" (demo)	Reed, Cale, Morrison	Previously unreleased	2:46
6.	"Guess I'm Falling in Love" (live)	Reed, Cale, Morrison, Tucker	Previously unreleased	4:10
7.	"Booker T." (live)	Reed, Cale, Morrison, Tucker	Previously unreleased	6:30
8.	"White Light/White Heat"		White Light/White Heat	2:45
9.	"The Gift"	Reed, Morrison, Cale, Tucker	White Light/White Heat	8:17
10.	"Lady Godiva's Operation"		White Light/White Heat	4:54
11.	"Here She Comes Now"	Reed, Cale, Morrison	White Light/White Heat	2:02
12.	"I Heard Her Call My Name"		White Light/White Heat	4:46
13.	"Sister Ray"	Reed, Cale, Morrison, Tucker	White Light/White Heat	17:27
14.	"Stephanie Says"		VU	2:49
15.	"Temptation Inside Your Heart"		VU	2:30
16.	"Hey Mr. Rain" (version one)	Reed, Cale, Morrison, Tucker	Another View	4:40
Total length:				74:17

Disc four
No.	Title	Writer(s)	Original release	Length
1.	"What Goes On" (live)		Previously unreleased	5:34
2.	"Candy Says"		The Velvet Underground "Closet Mix"	4:04
3.	"What Goes On"		The Velvet Underground "Closet Mix"	4:35
4.	"Some Kinda Love"		The Velvet Underground "Closet Mix"	3:39
5.	"Pale Blue Eyes"		The Velvet Underground "Closet Mix"	5:42
6.	"Jesus"		The Velvet Underground "Closet Mix"	3:24
7.	"Beginning to See the Light"		The Velvet Underground "Closet Mix"	4:47
8.	"I'm Set Free"		The Velvet Underground "Closet Mix"	4:04
9.	"That's the Story of My Life"		The Velvet Underground "Closet Mix"	2:02
10.	"The Murder Mystery"		The Velvet Underground "Closet Mix"	8:55
11.	"After Hours"		The Velvet Underground "Closet Mix"	2:09
12.	"Foggy Notion"	Reed, Morrison, Yule, Tucker, Weiss	VU	6:47
13.	"I Can't Stand It"		VU	3:22
14.	"I'm Sticking with You"		VU	2:28
15.	"One of These Days"		VU	4:00
16.	"Lisa Says"		VU	2:57
17.	"It's Just Too Much" (live)		Previously unreleased	2:59
18.	"Countess from Hong Kong" (demo)	Reed, Cale	Previously unreleased	3:17
Total length:				75:40

Disc five
No.	Title	Writer(s)	Original release	Length
1.	"Who Loves the Sun"		Loaded	2:45
2.	"Sweet Jane" (full-length version)		Loaded	4:06
3.	"Rock & Roll" (full-length version)		Loaded	4:43
4.	"Cool It Down"		Loaded	3:04
5.	"New Age" (long version)		Loaded	5:07
6.	"Head Held High"		Loaded	2:56
7.	"Lonesome Cowboy Bill"		Loaded	2:43
8.	"I Found a Reason"		Loaded	4:15
9.	"Train Round the Bend"		Loaded	3:21
10.	"Oh! Sweet Nuthin'"		Loaded	7:25
11.	"Satellite of Love"		Previously unreleased	2:58
12.	"Walk and Talk"		Previously unreleased	2:23
13.	"Oh Gin"		Previously unreleased	2:44
14.	"Sad Song"		Previously unreleased	3:30
15.	"Ocean"		Previously unreleased	5:43
16.	"Ride into the Sun"	Reed, Cale, Morrison, Tucker	Previously unreleased	3:20
17.	"Some Kinda Love" (live)		Previously unreleased	10:22
18.	"I'll Be Your Mirror" (live)		Live at Max's Kansas City	2:06
19.	"I Love You"		Previously unreleased	2:03
Total length:				77:44

== Personnel ==
The Velvet Underground

- John Cale – bass guitar, viola, keyboards (discs 1–3); lead vocal on "The Gift" and "Lady Godiva's Operation"; organ and viola on disc 5, track 15
- Sterling Morrison – guitar, bass guitar, backing vocals, co-vocal on "The Murder Mystery"
- Lou Reed – vocals, guitar, piano, harmonica
- Maureen Tucker – percussion (discs 2–5), lead vocal on "After Hours" and "I'm Sticking with You", co-vocal on "The Murder Mystery".
- Doug Yule – bass guitar, keyboards, guitars, drums (disc 4–5); lead vocal on "Candy Says", "Who Loves the Sun", "New Age", "Lonesome Cowboy Bill", "Oh! Sweet Nuthin'", "Ride into the Sun" and "I'll Be Your Mirror" (live).

Additional musicians

- Nico – lead vocal on "All Tomorrow's Parties" (both single and LP versions), "Femme Fatale", "I'll Be Your Mirror", "Melody Laughter", "It Was a Pleasure Then" and "Chelsea Girls"; backing vocals on "Sunday Morning"
- Adrian Barber – drums on "Who Loves the Sun" and "I Found a Reason"
- Tommy Castanaro – drums on "Cool It Down" and "Head Held High"
- Billy Yule – drums on "Lonesome Cowboy Bill", "Oh! Sweet Nuthin'", "Ocean", "Some Kinda Love" (live) and "I'll Be Your Mirror" (live).

Technical staff

- The Velvet Underground – producers (disc 1; disc 3: 1–7, 14–16, disc 4, disc 5: 17–18)
- Andy Warhol – producer (disc 2: 1–12)
- The Velvet Underground & Nico – producers (disc 2: 13)
- Tom Wilson – producer (disc 2: 14–15, disc 3: 8–13)
- Geoff Haslam, Shel Kagan and The Velvet Underground – producers (disc 5: 1–10, 15–16)
- Adrian Barber – producer (disc 5: 11–14, 19)
- Brigid Polk – engineer (disc 5: 17–18)
- Spencer Drate, Judith Salavetz, Sylvia Reed, Smayvision – design
