= The Velvet Underground & Nico (Castle Face and Friends album) =

Tribute album by Castle Face Records artists

Studio album by Castle Face & Friends (various artists)
- Released: November 7, 2012
- Genre: Indie rock; noise rock
- Label: Castle Face Records

The Velvet Underground & Nico is a 2012 track-for-track cover of the Velvet Underground's debut album, The Velvet Underground & Nico, by artists affiliated with Castle Face Records. The album was a co-release of Castle Face Records and Universal. Each track is covered, in order, by a different artist, including Thee Oh Sees, Ty Segall, the Fresh & Onlys, and Warm Soda. The artists were described collectively as "Castle Face and Friends."

== Reception and reviews ==
Before the album's release, three singles from the album received widespread attention: Thee Oh Sees' cover of "European Son", Ty Segall's cover of "Femme Fatale", and Blasted Canyon's cover of "Venus in Furs".

The album received mixed reviews. Consequence of Sound's Paula Mejia marked the album's "underwhelming beginning," while noting that "the majority of the tracks reverberate with awe-inspired shreds of noise, reeling and raw." The Vinyl District's Joseph Neff said the album "provides the problematic tradition of the tribute album with one of its better examples." John Dwyer of the East Bay Express declared there was "plenty of soul to be had" on the album, while noting that "some of the songs sound like flatter, demo-like iterations by the original band."

== Track listing ==
All tracks are written by Lou Reed, except "The Black Angel's Death Song," written by Reed and John Cale, and "European Son," written by Reed, Cale, Sterling Morrison, and Maureen Tucker.

No.	Title	Featured	Length
1.	"Sunday Morning"	Kelley Stoltz
2.	"I'm Waiting for the Man"	Warm Soda
3.	"Femme Fatale"	Ty Segall
4.	"Venus in Furs"	Blasted Canyons
5.	"Run Run Run"	White Fence
6.	"All Tomorrow's Parties"	The Fresh & Onlys
7.	"Heroin"	Burnt Ones
8.	"There She Goes Again"	The Mallard
9.	"I'll Be Your Mirror"	Here Comes The Here Comes
10.	"The Black Angel's Death Song"	K. Dylan + The Black Angel’s Death Songsmen
11.	"European Son"	Thee Oh Sees
