= I'll Be Your Mirror: A Tribute to The Velvet Underground & Nico =

Compilation album by various artists
- Released: September 24, 2021
- Length: 59:26
- Label: UMG, Verve
- Producer: Hal Willner

Singles from I'll Be Your Mirror: A Tribute to The Velvet Underground & Nico
- 1. "Run Run Run" Released: July 14, 2021; 2. "I'm Waiting for the Man" Released: July 29, 2021; 3. "I'll Be Your Mirror" Released: August 27, 2021; 4. "European Son" Released: September 10, 2021; 5. "Femme Fatale" Released: September 17, 2021

I'll Be Your Mirror: A Tribute to The Velvet Underground & Nico ratings
Aggregate scores
Source	Rating
Metacritic	79/100
Review scores
Source	Rating
AllMusic	3.5/5 stars
American Songwriter	3/5 stars
The Line of Best Fit	8/10
NME	4/5 stars
Pitchfork	7/10
Rolling Stone	4/5 stars
Uncut	9/10
Under the Radar	6/10 stars

I'll Be Your Mirror: A Tribute to The Velvet Underground & Nico is a tribute album, by various artists, to the eponymous 1967 album The Velvet Underground & Nico by American rock band the Velvet Underground and German singer Nico. The tribute album was released by Verve Records and Universal Music Group on September 24, 2021, and features recordings of the original album's 11 songs by artists including St. Vincent, Sharon Van Etten, Bobby Gillespie, and Iggy Pop among others. The album released in proximity to The Velvet Underground, a documentary on the band by director Todd Haynes which was released October 15.

== Track listing ==
All tracks are written by Lou Reed, except where noted.

I'll Be Your Mirror: A Tribute to The Velvet Underground & Nico track listing
No.	Title	Writer(s)	Producer(s)	Length
1.	"Sunday Morning" (Michael Stipe)	Reed; John Cale	Stipe; Andy LeMaster; Hal Willner	3:50
2.	"I'm Waiting for the Man" (Matt Berninger)		Sean O'Brien	3:44
3.	"Femme Fatale" (Sharon Van Etten)		Van Etten; Daniel Knowles	4:42
4.	"Venus in Furs" (Andrew Bird, Lucius)		Bird; Jess Wolfe; Holly Laessig	6:55
5.	"Run Run Run" (Kurt Vile)		Vile; Rob Laakso	6:59
6.	"All Tomorrow's Parties" (St. Vincent, Thomas Bartlett)		Annie Clark; Bartlett	4:51
7.	"Heroin" (Thurston Moore, Bobby Gillespie)		Moore	7:24
8.	"There She Goes Again" (King Princess)		King Princess; Mike Malchicoff	3:28
9.	"I'll Be Your Mirror" (Courtney Barnett)		Barnett	2:27
10.	"The Black Angel's Death Song" (Fontaines D.C.)	Cale; Reed	Dan Carey	3:11
11.	"European Son" (Iggy Pop, Matt Sweeney)	Cale; Reed; Maureen Ann Tucker; Sterling Morrison	Sweeney	7:45

Digital-only bonus track
No.	Title	Producer(s)	Length
12.	"Run Run Run - Radio Edit" (Kurt Vile)	Vile; Laakso	4:04
Total length:			59:26

== Charts ==
Chart performance for I'll Be Your Mirror: A Tribute to The Velvet Underground & Nico
Chart (2021)	Peak position
Austrian Albums (Ö3 Austria)	44
Dutch Albums (Album Top 100)	6
German Albums (Offizielle Top 100)	26
Swiss Albums (Schweizer Hitparade)	41
