= Heaven & Hell: A Tribute to the Velvet Underground =

- Cover to Volume One

Compilation album series by various artists
- Released: 1990
- Genre: Rock
- Label: Imaginary

Singles from Heaven & Hell: A Tribute to the Velvet Underground
- 1. "Here She Comes Now" Released: June 1991

Heaven & Hell: A Tribute to the Velvet Underground is a series of tribute albums released by Imaginary Records in the UK dedicated to American rock band the Velvet Underground. While not technically part of the series, Imaginary Records also released another tribute album to the Velvet Underground, called Fifteen Minutes which is in fact merely a compilation of fourteen tracks from the three Heaven & Hell albums. In 2009 Ozit-Morpheus Records re-released this compilation under the title Unpiecing the Jigsaw: A Tribute to the Velvet Underground which appended two live tracks by Nico ("Femme Fatale" and "All Tomorrow's Parties") to the third disc, and, on a fourth disc, a lengthy interview called 47 Minutes in Depth With Lou Reed.

== Volume One ==
1. Chapterhouse – "Lady Godiva's Operation"
2. The Telescopes – "Candy Says"
3. Nirvana – "Here She Comes Now"
4. The Wedding Present – "She's My Best Friend"
5. Buffalo Tom – "All Tomorrow's Parties"
6. James – "Sunday Morning"
7. Screaming Trees – "What Goes On"
8. The Motorcycle Boy – "Run Run Run"
9. Terry Bickers/Bradleigh Smith – "I'm Set Free"
10. Ride – "European Son"

== Volume Two ==
1. Beef – "Femme Fatale"
2. The Fatima Mansions – Lady Godiva's Operation"
3. The Mock Turtles – "Pale Blue Eyes"
4. Revenge – "White Light/White Heat"
5. The Reegs – "All Tomorrow's Parties"
6. Bill Nelson and The Roy Rodgers Rocketeers – "Lonesome Cowboy Bill"
7. Echo & the Bunnymen – "Foggy Notion"
8. Levellers 5 – "Some Kinda Love"
9. Shelleyan Orphan – "Who Loves the Sun"
10. Hurrah! – "Sweet Jane"

== Volume Three ==
1. Swervedriver – "Jesus"
2. Eleventh Dream Day – "Ocean"
3. Into Paradise – "Beginning to See the Light"
4. Lee Ranaldo – "Stephanie Says"
5. Half Japanese – "I Heard Her Call My Name"
6. The Dylans – "Who Loves the Sun"
7. The Original Sins – "Head Held High"
8. New FADS – "I'm Set Free"
9. Jellyfish Kiss – "I'm Sticking with You"
10. The Badgeman - "Sister Ray"
