= Fifteen Minutes: A Tribute to The Velvet Underground =

Compilation album by various artists
- Released: 1994
- Language: English
- Label: Imaginary

Fifteen Minutes: A Tribute to the Velvet Underground is an album released by Imaginary Records in the UK in 1994. The album consisted of contemporary artists performing cover versions of songs by the Velvet Underground. All the tracks had previously appeared on the three-volume Heaven & Hell series of covers of Velvet Underground tracks.

== Track listing ==
1. Nirvana – "Here She Comes Now"
2. Swervedriver – "Jesus"
3. Lee Ranaldo – "Stephanie Says (1.15.91)"
4. Buffalo Tom – "All Tomorrow's Parties"
5. New F.A.D.S. – "I'm Set Free"
6. The Fatima Mansions – "Lady Godiva's Operation"
7. James – "Sunday Morning"
8. Eleventh Dream Day – "Ocean"
9. Echo & the Bunnymen – "Foggy Notion"
10. Screaming Trees – "What Goes On"
11. The Wedding Present – "She's My Best Friend"
12. Half Japanese – "I Heard Her Call My Name"
13. The Mock Turtles – "Pale Blue Eyes"
14. Ride – "European Son"
