= Live MCMXCIII =

Live album by the Velvet Underground
- Released: October 26, 1993
- Recorded: June 15–17, 1993
- Venue: L'Olympia Theater, Paris, France
- Length: 128:39 (double album); 67:33 (single album); 92:40 (video)
- Label: Sire
- Producer: Mike Rathke

The Velvet Underground chronology
Another View (1986)	Live MCMXCIII (1993)	Peel Slowly and See (1995)

Single-CD edition

Professional ratings
Review scores
Source	Rating
AllMusic (double CD)	2/5 stars
AllMusic (single CD)	3/5 stars
The Encyclopedia of Popular Music	3/5 stars
MusicHound Rock: The Essential Album Guide	3/5 stars
The New Rolling Stone Album Guide	3/5 stars

Live MCMXCIII ("1993" in Roman numerals) is a live album by the American rock band the Velvet Underground, released in 1993 by Sire Records. It was released simultaneously in single and double CD/cassette formats on October 26, 1993 (with the single CD being an abridged version). A VHS and laserdisc video album originally came out as well. In 2006, a DVD version of the concert was released as Velvet Redux Live MCMXCIII by Warner Music Vision and Rhino Home Video.

== Background ==
In late 1992, the Velvet Underground 1965–1968 core line-up of Lou Reed, John Cale, Sterling Morrison and Maureen Tucker suddenly decided to reform. The decision was unexpected because the relationship between Reed and Cale had been sour ever since the late 1960s, and though it had ameliorated after back catalogue royalty renegotiations in the mid-1980s, it had hit another low after their 1990 collaboration Songs for Drella.

Nevertheless, an impromptu one-song reunion in Jouy-en-Josas, France, later that year for an Andy Warhol exhibition set the scene, and by 1993 the band had started to rehearse for a world tour. Lou Reed's then-current record company, Sire Records, agreed to release a live album from the European leg, and plans were made for both an MTV Unplugged appearance with accompanying album and a subsequent studio album.

The album was recorded during a three-night residence in the Paris venue L'Olympia. John Cale later said, "During the second night we hit the home run". Live MCMXCIII captures the band playing most of their classics from the back catalogue, with emphasis on the more structured songs. The band also performed two new songs: "Velvet Nursery Rhyme", a short tongue-in-cheek reunion theme song where Reed introduces the members of the band, and "Coyote", a Reed/Cale collaboration. Emphasis is on the band's first three records and the "lost fourth album" (see VU and Another View), with only two songs from Loaded. During the six-week European leg, relationships quickly soured again and by the end of the tour all other plans were off, never to rematerialise. The band's latest breakup proved final when Sterling Morrison died in the summer of 1995.

The Velvet Underground's reunion itself met with critical praise from the mainstream rock press, and generated heavy publicity for the band (resulting in the six-week European leg having many sold-out venues or near capacity), but the album received mixed reviews.

After its release, Cale expressed disappointment in the album's mix:

The trouble is that we had an opportunity here with the live album to really show what the band sounded like and it really doesn't give it to you. Some of the bootlegs that came out of the tour are almost a truer vision of what the band sounded like than the well recorded one, because the well recorded one really didn't take advantage of the ambiance of the room in the mix of the music. And that's what we were always pushing at. We wanted to fill the room up with this noise. Unfortunately it wasn't quite as present in the mix as I would have liked it to be or others would have liked it to be either.

== Track listing ==
All tracks written by Lou Reed, except as noted.

=== Double CD edition ===
Disc one

1. "We're Gonna Have a Real Good Time Together" – 3:14
2. "Venus in Furs" – 5:19
3. "Guess I'm Falling in Love" (Reed, John Cale, Maureen Tucker, Sterling Morrison) – 3:08
4. "Afterhours" – 2:41
5. "All Tomorrow's Parties" – 6:36
6. "Some Kinda Love" – 9:06
7. "I'll Be Your Mirror" – 3:06
8. "Beginning to See the Light" – 4:59
9. "The Gift" (Reed, Cale, Tucker, Morrison) – 10:33
10. "I Heard Her Call My Name" – 4:37
11. "Femme Fatale" – 3:23

Disc two

1. "Hey Mr. Rain" (Reed, Cale, Tucker, Morrison) – 15:42
2. "Sweet Jane" – 5:21
3. "Velvet Nursery Rhyme" (Reed, Cale, Tucker, Morrison) – 1:31
4. "White Light/White Heat" – 4:21
5. "I'm Sticking with You" – 3:23
6. "The Black Angel's Death Song" (Reed, Cale) – 4:12
7. "Rock 'n' Roll" – 6:13
8. "I Can't Stand It" – 4:21
9. "I'm Waiting for the Man" – 5:15
10. "Heroin" – 9:59
11. "Pale Blue Eyes" – 6:14
12. "Coyote" (Reed, Cale) – 5:25

=== Single CD edition ===
1. "Venus in Furs" – 5:30
2. "Sweet Jane" – 5:23
3. "Afterhours" – 2:44
4. "All Tomorrow's Parties" – 6:37
5. "Some Kinda Love" – 9:08
6. "The Gift" (Reed, Cale, Tucker, Morrison) – 10:34
7. "Rock 'n' Roll" – 6:12
8. "I'm Waiting for the Man" – 5:16
9. "Heroin" – 9:50
10. "Pale Blue Eyes" – 6:18

=== Video edition ===
1. "Venus in Furs" - 5:44
2. "White Light/White Heat" - 4:20
3. "Beginning to See the Light" - 5:04
4. "Some Kinda Love" - 6:37
5. "Femme Fatale" - 3:44
6. "Hey Mr. Rain" - 15:42
7. "I’m Sticking with You" - 3:30
8. "I Heard Her Call My Name" - 4:43
9. "I’ll Be Your Mirror" - 3:15
10. "Rock 'n' Roll" - 6:13
11. "Sweet Jane" - 5:16
12. "I'm Waiting for the Man" - 5:17
13. "Heroin" - 9:27
14. "Pale Blue Eyes" - 7:45
15. "Coyote" - 5:58

== Personnel ==
The Velvet Underground

- Lou Reed – guitar, vocals
- John Cale – bass guitar, keyboards, viola, vocals
- Maureen Tucker – drums, vocals
- Sterling Morrison – guitar, bass guitar

Technical

- Mike Rathke – producer, mixing
- Roger Moutenot – engineer, mixing
- Charlie Dos Santos – assistant engineer
- Sylvia Reed – art direction, design
- Spencer Drate – art direction, design
- Dennis Ascienzo – additional design
- Jükta Salavetz – additional design
- Ted Chin – photography
- Bob Ludwig – mastering
- Brian K. Lee – editing
- Bill Fertig – house mixer
- Nick Davis – Eurosound Mobile 4 engineer
- Peter Brandt – Eurosound Mobile 4 assistant engineer
- Henk van Helvoirt – assistant to Peter Brandt
- Bram de Groot – assistant to Peter Brandt
