= Loaded (Fully Loaded Edition) =

Box set by the Velvet Underground
- Released: February 1997
- Genre: Rock; pop; proto-punk
- Length: Disc one: 1:01:46; Disc two: 1:05:56
- Label: Rhino
- Producer: Bill Inglot; Patrick Milligan

The Velvet Underground chronology
Peel Slowly and See (1995)	Loaded (Fully Loaded Edition) (1997)	Final V.U. 1971–1973 (2001)

Loaded (Fully Loaded Edition) is a two-disc boxed-set by the American rock band the Velvet Underground, released on February 18, 1997 by Rhino Records. It contains the full length version of the original 1970 album, Loaded, and an additional 17 previously unreleased tracks. It also contains numerous alternate takes, alternate mixes, and demo versions of Loaded singles. The set contains a 23 page booklet authored by music journalist David Fricke, and also features unseen session photographs of the band.

== Background ==
Producer Bill Inglot discovered the previously unissued material as he was researching the Polydor Chronicles boxed set. He explained, "it wasn't really brain surgery to find this stuff. It's not like these things were buried under Ertegun's ashtrays or anything like that". He went on to say that "it was just that no one had ever really looked for it, the reason this stuff was never [bootlegged] was that it was never mixed down, or if it was mixed down, the mixes didn't survive over time". Rhino A&R manager Patrick Milligan, who co-produced the set, recalls that after looking over the newfound material, "the decision to present an 'alternate album' arose naturally ... since there's enough for two discs, why not organize it this way ... it just sort of came about because the material was just there".

On the original 1970 album, "Sweet Jane", which American music critic, Richie Unterberger, refers to as the "most renowned Loaded track", the bridge "heavenly days of wine and roses" is left out, but it is resurrected for this album. Additionally, after Lou Reed had quit the band, a coda was chopped out of "Sweet Jane" on the original album, and it is restored as well. Speaking to People Magazine in 1997, Reed said that "any album that has 'Sweet Jane' and 'Rock & Roll' on it has to be a killer album," referring to the 1970 album. He went on to say about his leaving the band, "I was unhappy about the management that went along with the album, not the album itself". When asked about the new boxed-set being released, he opined, "I can't imagine it's going to do well, the Velvet Underground was a cult group, always was, always will be". Reed told music journalist David Fricke that the single "Rock & Roll" is about him, "if I hadn't heard rock 'n' roll on the radio, I would have had no idea there was life on this planet", he quipped.

Maureen Tucker is featured on the outtake "I'm Sticking with You" (vocals), and the demo "I Found a Reason" (drums). However, on the original album, she didn't participate in the recording due to her being pregnant. Doug Yule recalled "the one thing, looking back, that I see as a major mistake that we as a group made was when Steve Sesnick (the bands manager) said, Maureen can't play on this album because she's pregnant ... we should have said, 'oh, well, then, we'll wait and do the album when she's ready". There is also an "orchestral" alternate-take recording of "Ocean" for which the liner notes erroneously credit John Cale on organ. Yule, who played organ on the recording, said in a 1995 interview that the strings used on the track were two cellos and double bass provided by session musicians who followed Yule's musical chart and instructions. Yule added that he couldn't recall Cale ever coming to the sessions.

== Artwork ==
External images
- via The Internet Archive & Discogs
- Image of CD cover with pink and green smoke
- Dutch version with green and blue smoke

The set was packaged with special lenticular printing that enhanced the original artwork by Stanisław Zagórski. The original artwork on Loaded, had Zagorski's drawing of smoke colored in pink in the U.S. version, and the smoke was green and blue in the Dutch release. On the boxed-set, the smoke appears to change color between pink and green, and rises from the New York subway station.

Zagorski, who drew a lot of artwork for album covers for Atlantic Records in the 1970s, says "they would call me, tell me the album title, give a short description of the music, and since I was still very foreign in terms of experience in New York, I thought of 'Underground' in terms of the subway". He also admitted that when he designed the original album cover, he wasn't really familiar with the band. In the booklet accompanying the set, David Fricke wrote, "the cover has its own charm; it certainly suits the record's playful spirit of commercial subversion and is a neat twist on the Velvets' then-standing reputation as drugged-up terrors".

== Release and marketing ==
A "teaser postcard" went out in January 1997, to retail stores, the press, and radio stations, that highlighted all the unreleased material. Rhino's promotion department also released advance copies of the set to "specialty-show DJS, classic rock stations, alternative stations, and public stations". According to Rhino product manager Jim Hughes, "we're looking at one of those rare releases that appeals both to casual fans and collectors". The boxed-set was released on February 18, 1997.

== Reception ==
American music journalist Chris Morris noted that the "newly discovered material reflects a wealth of influences beyond the pop and doo-wop styles so prevalent on the original version of the album". Yule said the alternate version "comes closer to capturing the live sound of the band". He opined that he actually liked the new version better, because "they appeal to me more, they feel more like the band ... the general feel of the raw tracks before they were compressed and compacted was much better, much more natural". Billboards managing editor in 1997, Susan Nunziata, included the boxed-set in her top ten list for 1997s "The Year In Music", a feature that appears in the magazine at the end of the year.

American author David Browne said of the album, "some revises are absurdly overdue ... when comparing this reissue with the 1970 Loaded ... even though it remains the slightest, most unnaturally sunny record the band ever made, the rejiggered Loaded makes the original sound like it was mixed by monkeys". He went on to opine that "the guitars are as crisp and up front as the vocals, and "Sweet Jane" and "Rock & Roll" have been restored to their complete, unedited versions ... the new lenticular cover art, which brings to life the steam rising from that subway entrance, now mirrors the smoke that must have emanated from Lou Reed's ears when he heard the butchered original LP".

Ed Brown from Fortune stated that the "newly reissued two-CD version comes with a disk of alternate takes that, surprisingly, is better than the original album ... take "Sweet Jane" ... compared with the early version, the cut that ended up on the original album sounds slick and superficial ... guitarist Sterling Morrison seems vaguely ashamed of the song's rhythm-and-blues roots, while Lou Reed replaces the honesty of his earlier rehearsal with a vocal swagger". Julene Snyder wrote in the San Francisco Examiner that "the box set is a glimpse behind the curtain of one of the most justly revered rock bands ever".

American music critic, Brett Milano wrote that the "Fully Loaded Edition pulls a fast one on collectors by packaging material (they likely already own) ... together with an 'alternate album' of newly unearthed versions and mixes". He commented that "these lack the pop sheen of the finished tracks, but some fans may prefer it that way ... "Oh! Sweet Nuthin" is less moving here but more rocking ... "Cool It Down" and "Rock & Roll" have a more primitive feel that harks back to the guitar jams on White Light/White Heat". He also noted that "the original full-length mix of "Sweet Jane", including the closing "heavenly wine and roses" bridge is restored, which is possibly the giddiest moment in the Velvets' catalog ... after all these years, "Sweet Jane" has a happy ending".

== Tracklist ==
Original album: extended versions, tracks 2, 3 & 5 originally released on Peel Slowly and See box set. Bonus tracks: 11, 12 & 14 originally released on Peel Slowly And See, tracks 13 & 15 previously unissued. All songs written by Lou Reed, except "Ride Into The Sun", written by Reed, John Cale, Sterling Morrison and Maureen Tucker.

Alternate album: tracks 1 to 10, previously unissued alternate versions. Bonus tracks: tracks 14,15 & 16 originally released on Peel Slowly and See. Tracks 11, 12, 13 & 17 previously unissued.

Disc One (Original album with bonus tracks)
No.	Title	Writer(s)	Length
1.	"Who Loves the Sun"		2:45
2.	"Sweet Jane" (Full-length version)		4:06
3.	"Rock & Roll" (Full-length version)		4:43
4.	"Cool It Down"		3:06
5.	"New Age" (Long version)		5:07
6.	"Head Held High"		2:58
7.	"Lonesome Cowboy Bill"		2:45
8.	"I Found a Reason"		4:17
9.	"Train Round the Bend"		3:22
10.	"Oh! Sweet Nuthin'"		7:29
11.	"Ride into the Sun" (Demo)	John Cale, Morrison, Reed, Maureen Tucker	3:20
12.	"Ocean" (Outtake)		5:43
13.	"I'm Sticking with You" (Outtake)		3:06
14.	"I Love You" (Demo)		2:03
15.	"Rock & Roll" (Alternate mix)		4:41
16.	"Head Held High" (Alternate mix)		2:15
Total length:			1:01:46

Disc Two (Alternate album with bonus tracks)
No.	Title	Length
1.	"Who Loves the Sun" (Alternate mix)	2:59
2.	"Sweet Jane" (Early version)	5:22
3.	"Rock & Roll" (Demo)	4:45
4.	"Cool It Down" (Early version)	4:14
5.	"New Age" (Full-length version)	5:44
6.	"Head Held High" (Early version)	2:48
7.	"Lonesome Cowboy Bill" (Early version)	3:14
8.	"I Found a Reason" (Demo)	3:16
9.	"Train Round the Bend" (Alternate mix)	4:36
10.	"Oh! Sweet Nuthin'" (Early version)	4:04
11.	"Ocean" (Demo)	6:27
12.	"I Love You" (Outtake)	2:03
13.	"Satellite of Love" (Alternate demo)	2:51
14.	"Oh Gin" (Demo)	2:54
15.	"Walk and Talk" (Demo)	2:47
16.	"Sad Song" (Demo)	3:43
17.	"Love Makes You Feel Ten Feet Tall" (Demo)	4.09
Total length:		1:05:56

== Personnel ==
The Velvet Underground

- Lou Reed – vocals, rhythm guitar, piano; lyrics, composition
- Doug Yule – bass guitar, piano, organ, lead guitar, acoustic guitar, drums, percussion, vocals; lyrics, composition
- Sterling Morrison – lead and rhythm guitars; composition
- Maureen Tucker – drums

Additional musicians

- Adrian Barber – drums on "Who Loves the Sun"
- Tommy Castagnaro – drums on "Cool It Down" and "Head Held High"
- Billy Yule – drums on "Lonesome Cowboy Bill" and "Oh! Sweet Nuthin'"

== See also ==
- Lou Reed discography
- List of proto-punk bands
