= Wrap Your Troubles in Dreams =

Wrap Your Troubles in Dreams may refer to:

- "Wrap Your Troubles in Dreams" (song), a 1931 popular standard by Harry Barris, Ted Koehler, and Billy Moll
- Wrap Your Troubles in Dreams (album), a 1997 album by The 69 Eyes
- "Wrap Your Troubles in Dreams," a song written by Lou Reed, performed by Nico on her 1967 album Chelsea Girl
