= Here She Comes Now =

Single by The Velvet Underground

from the album White Light/White Heat
- A-side: "White Light/White Heat"
- Released: January 1968
- Recorded: September 1967
- Studio: Scepter, New York City
- Genre: Psychedelic folk
- Length: 2:04
- Label: Verve
- Composers: Lou Reed; John Cale; Sterling Morrison; Maureen Tucker
- Lyricist: Lou Reed
- Producer: Tom Wilson

The Velvet Underground singles chronology
"Sunday Morning" / "Femme Fatale" (1966)	"Here She Comes Now" / "White Light/White Heat" (1968)	"What Goes On" / "Jesus" (1969)

"Here She Comes Now" is a song released by the American rock band the Velvet Underground in January 1968, from their second studio album White Light/White Heat. As the shortest song on the album, the performance and mix of the song are both considered simple and traditional, making it somewhat distinct from the other five songs on the album, all of which contain some degree of experimental or avant-garde elements in terms of sound.

== Background ==
"Here She Comes Now" was recorded during the recording sessions for White Light/White Heat in September 1967 at Scepter Studios in Manhattan. Lou Reed originally intended the song to be sung by Nico, who had sung it on a few occasions during the Exploding Plastic Inevitable events, however her collaboration with the group had ended before recording for White Light/White Heat had begun. Subsequently, Reed had decided to take over vocals for the song. The song was first demoed in two takes during the winter of 1967 by Reed, Sterling Morrison and John Cale at their Ludlow Street apartment. In 1995, the demo was released on the box set Peel Slowly and See.

== Lyrical interpretations ==
The double entendre of the title has been interpreted by writers to mean that the song is about sex and female orgasm. Due to the group's fondness of writing songs related to drug use, the word "she" has also been regarded as a metaphor for drugs and "awaiting an intoxication that fails to occur". This is further suggested by the feminine code names for drugs such as "Lucy" for LSD. Gerard Malanga and Victor Bockris, authors of Uptight: The Velvet Underground Story, described the song as a "rather pretty 4-line dissertation on the possibility that a girl might come". Another common interpretation is that the song is about Reed's Ostrich guitar. The line "She's made out of wood" and Reed's habit of exclaiming "Here she comes now" before soloing on various live recordings and performances lend credence to this.

== Critical reception ==
Eddie Gibson of Music Review Database praised the song as "one of the more beautiful tracks from White Light/White Heat". He described the instrumentation as "delicate and in an acoustic manor" [sic] and said "it's something spectacular because the guitar is very delirious and the sparse drumming only adds to the beautiful atmosphere". He also commented that the delayed reverb gave the song a "sweet, melancholy edge over the rest of the album". Uncut described it as "a soothing mantra that served as a brief moment of balm amongst the blistering noise, a guttering light in the churning darkness". Similarly, Mark Deming of AllMusic considered it "the album's sole 'pretty' song" and "mildly disquieting". Authors Scott Schinder and Andy Schwartz deemed the song "the album's lone melodic ballad" that "carried an uneasy undercurrent". Author Doyle Greene considered the track "a brief and relatively sedate song closest to the psychedelic folk leanings of the first album".

== Recordings and personnel ==
Although known to have been played live, no other recorded versions than the demo and the White Light/White Heat studio version are known to exist.

=== 1967 demo personnel ===
- Lou Reed – lead vocals, rhythm guitar
- Sterling Morrison – lead guitar
- John Cale – viola

=== 1967 studio personnel ===
- Lou Reed – lead vocals, lead guitar, piano
- John Cale – viola, bass
- Sterling Morrison – rhythm guitar, backing vocals
- Maureen Tucker – percussion

== Cover versions ==
=== Nirvana ===
A version of the song was recorded by American rock band Nirvana in April 1990, during a session at Smart Studios in Madison, Wisconsin, with Butch Vig. It was released by The Communion Label in 1991 on the compilation album Heaven & Hell: A Tribute to the Velvet Underground and as a split single with the Melvins, who covered the Velvet Underground song, "Venus in Furs." Another version was recorded during a radio session in Hilversum, the Netherlands on November 25, 1991, for the Dutch stations VPRO and VARA. This version remains unreleased. The song was occasionally covered by the band in concert in 1990 and 1991.

=== Other versions ===
Cabaret Voltaire recorded a cover version on their debut EP Extended Play in 1978.

The song was also covered by dream pop band Galaxie 500 as the B-side for their 1990 single "Fourth of July", with the cover later appearing as a bonus track on reissues of their 1990 album This Is Our Music.
