= The Gift (The Velvet Underground song) =

Song by the Velvet Underground

from the album White Light/White Heat
- Released: January 30, 1968
- Recorded: September 1967
- Studio: Scepter Studios, New York City
- Genre: Experimental rock; noise rock; art rock; proto-punk; R&B
- Length: 8:19
- Label: Verve
- Composers: John Cale; Sterling Morrison; Maureen Tucker; Lou Reed
- Lyricist: Lou Reed
- Producer: Tom Wilson

"The Gift" is a song by the American rock band the Velvet Underground from their 1968 album White Light/White Heat. The song is over eight minutes long and, in the stereo version, mixed in such a way that John Cale reading a short story by Lou Reed can be heard in the left channel while a rock instrumental is heard on the right.

== Elements ==
=== Short story ===
The short story, recited by a deadpan John Cale, was written by Lou Reed as a writing project during his time at Syracuse University.

The narrative concerns Waldo Jeffers, a lovesick youth, who has engaged in a distressing long-distance relationship with his college girlfriend Marsha Bronson. After their school terms end, Waldo returns to his hometown of Locust, Pennsylvania. He becomes increasingly paranoid over the course of two months, worried that Marsha might not stay faithful to him as promised. Lacking the requisite money to visit her in Wisconsin, he concocts a plan to mail himself to her in a large cardboard box, expecting it will be a welcome surprise to Marsha. He ships himself on Friday.

The following Monday, Marsha is having a discussion with her friend Sheila Klein about Bill, a man that Marsha slept with the previous night. When the package arrives at the door, the two struggle to open the box while Waldo waits excitedly inside. Unable to open the box by other means and frustrated, Marsha retrieves a sheet metal cutter from her basement and gives it to Sheila, who inadvertently stabs it through the center of Waldo's head.

=== Music ===
It appears in five versions on the Super Deluxe 45th Anniversary Edition of White Light/White Heat: stereo, mono, vocal only, instrumental only, and live instrumental.

The instrumental track was originally developed from live jams. Contrary to rumor, it is not the same song as "Booker T.", as noted in David Fricke's essay in the 2013 deluxe reissue of White Light/White Heat.

At the urging of Frank Zappa, Reed provided the sound effect of Waldo's head being cut by stabbing a cantaloupe either by using a knife or a wrench.

The remastered version was released on the 1995 Peel Slowly and See box set, and subsequently released on a standalone 1996 CD.

A live version appears on Live MCMXCIII.

== Personnel ==
- John Cale – spoken word, fuzz bass guitar
- Lou Reed – electric guitar, cantaloupe
- Sterling Morrison – electric guitar
- Maureen Tucker – percussion, drums
