= Chelsea Girl =

Studio album by Nico
- Released: October 1967
- Recorded: April–May 1967
- Studios: Mayfair Recording, Manhattan
- Genres: Folk rock; baroque pop; avant-pop; art rock; experimental rock
- Length: 45:04
- Label: Verve
- Producer: Tom Wilson

Nico chronology
The Velvet Underground & Nico (1967)	Chelsea Girl (1967)	The Marble Index (1968)

Chelsea Girl is the debut solo album by the German singer Nico, produced by Tom Wilson. It was released in October 1967 by Verve Records and was recorded following Nico's collaboration with the Velvet Underground on their 1967 debut studio album. The title is a reference to Andy Warhol's 1966 film Chelsea Girls, in which Nico starred.

Much of the album features instrumental work and songwriting credits from Velvet Underground members Lou Reed, Sterling Morrison, and John Cale. "I'll Keep It with Mine" was written by Bob Dylan, while three songs are by Jackson Browne, who contributed guitar. Wilson added string and flute arrangements against the wishes of Nico.

== Background ==
After collaborating as a singer with the Velvet Underground on their debut The Velvet Underground & Nico (recorded in 1966 and released in March of the following year), Warhol superstar Nico toured with the band in Andy Warhol's Exploding Plastic Inevitable (EPI) multimedia roadshow. Before the EPI came to an end in 1967, Nico took up residence in a New York City coffeehouse as a solo folk chanteuse; accompanied in turn by guitarists such as Tim Hardin, Jackson Browne, and also her Velvet Underground bandmates Lou Reed, Sterling Morrison and John Cale.

== Composition ==
Some of the accompanists wrote songs for Nico to sing, and these form the backbone of Chelsea Girl. Browne contributed "The Fairest of the Seasons", "These Days", and "Somewhere There's a Feather", while Hardin contributed "Eulogy to Lenny Bruce". "Wrap Your Troubles in Dreams" by Lou Reed was part of the earliest Velvet Underground repertoire (which did not surface as a Velvet Underground recording until it was included in the 1995 box set Peel Slowly and See), and Reed, Cale and Morrison in various combinations contributed four more songs. Bob Dylan gave her one of his songs to record: "I'll Keep It with Mine".

Chelsea Girl can be described as a cross between chamber folk and 1960s baroque pop. The musical backing is relatively simple, consisting of one or two guitars or, alternatively, a keyboard instrument, played by either Browne or (a combination of) her Velvet Underground colleagues, but there are no drums or bass instruments, hence the absence of Velvets drummer Maureen Tucker, and adding to the chamber folk feel of the music are the string and flute overdubs added to the initial recordings by producer Tom Wilson and arranger Larry Fallon without involving or consulting Nico.

== Legacy ==
Professional ratings
Review scores
Source	Rating
AllMusic	4.5/5 stars
Pitchfork	8.9/10
Rolling Stone	4/5 stars
Trouser Press	favorable

In retrospective 21st-century reviews, AllMusic described the album as "an unqualified masterpiece", while Trouser Press said it "is sabotaged by tepid arrangements and weak production" and is "of interest mainly for its links to the band Nico had just left". Chelsea Girl is listed in the book 1001 Albums You Must Hear Before You Die, in which Mary Boukouvalas writes: "The public were unprepared for Nico's experimental art-rock masterpieces and their melancholic ambience, and the album made little impression upon release. But its desolate beauty — and Nico's unique, provocative later work with John Cale — has fascinated subsequent generations." She cited Patti Smith and Siouxsie Sioux as artists influenced by Chelsea Girl.

Nico was dissatisfied with the album. In 1981, she said she could not listen to it. According to Nico, her requests for drums and more guitar were refused, and she disliked the orchestrations: "I didn't like [the strings], but I could live with them. But the flute! The first time I heard the album, I cried and it was all because of the flute."

== Track listing ==
=== Side A ===
No.	Title	Writer(s)	Length
1.	"The Fairest of the Seasons"	Jackson Browne, Gregory Copeland	4:06
2.	"These Days"	Browne	3:30
3.	"Little Sister"	John Cale, Lou Reed	4:22
4.	"Winter Song"	Cale	3:17
5.	"It Was a Pleasure Then"	Reed, Cale, Nico	8:02

=== Side B ===
No.	Title	Writer(s)	Length
1.	"Chelsea Girls"	Reed, Sterling Morrison	7:22
2.	"I'll Keep It with Mine"	Bob Dylan	3:17
3.	"Somewhere There's a Feather"	Browne	2:16
4.	"Wrap Your Troubles in Dreams"	Reed	5:07
5.	"Eulogy to Lenny Bruce"	Tim Hardin	3:45

== Personnel ==
=== Musicians ===
- Nico – vocals
- Jackson Browne – guitars (tracks A1–2, B2–3, B5)
- Lou Reed – electric guitar (tracks A3, A5, B1, B4)
- John Cale – viola, organ, guitar (tracks A3–5)
- Sterling Morrison – electric guitar (tracks B1, B4)

=== Technical ===
- Tom Wilson – producer
- Val Valentin – director of engineering
- Gary Kellgren – recording and remix engineer
- Larry Fallon – string and flute arrangements
- Billy Name – photography
- Paul Morrissey – photography
