= Chelsea Girls (song) =

Song by Nico

from the album Chelsea Girl
- Released: October 1967
- Recorded: April 4, 1967, Mayfair Recording Studios, Manhattan; May 1967, flute and strings overdubs
- Length: 7:22
- Label: Verve Records
- Songwriters: Lou Reed, Sterling Morrison
- Producer: Tom Wilson

"Chelsea Girls" is the title track of Nico's 1967 debut album, Chelsea Girl. The song was written by Lou Reed and Sterling Morrison of the Velvet Underground, whom Nico had collaborated with for their debut album the previous year.

The title of the song and the album itself is a reference to the 1966 film of the same name by Andy Warhol, which Nico starred in herself. The film was an experimental reality movie that focused on the various residents of the Hotel Chelsea during Warhol's Factory days. Many of them were Bohemian artists, drop outs, and drug addicts, which is also described in the lyrics of the song, and also referred to are turning tricks, heroin, S&M, amphetamine and silver foil.

Running at just under seven and a half minutes long, "Chelsea Girls" is similar in style to a ballad, telling the stories of various residents at the hotel. It features guitar work from both Reed and Morrison, who wrote the song together, as well as a flute and string section, both of which are prominent throughout the song.

Nico stated in interviews that she "hated" the flute, but had no say in the matter because it was in the hands of Tom Wilson, who produced the album.

== Cover versions ==
Singer-songwriter Elliott Smith played the song at least once during his live performances.

Japanese actress/singer Miki Nakatani covered the song as the B-side of her 2001 single "Air Pocket", produced by Ryuichi Sakamoto.

The song was also covered by Stereo Total and included on their 2005 album Do the Bambi.

English guitarist/singer Bernie Tormé released a hard rock version on his 1982 album "Turn out the lights"
