= White Light/White Heat =

Studio album by the Velvet Underground
- Released: January 30, 1968
- Recorded: September 4–16, 1967
- Studios: Mayfair Sound, Manhattan
- Genres: Noise rock; proto-punk; art rock; experimental rock; acid rock
- Length: 40:13
- Label: Verve
- Producer: Tom Wilson

The Velvet Underground chronology
The Velvet Underground & Nico (1967)	White Light/White Heat (1968)	The Velvet Underground (1969)

1971 UK reissue cover

Singles from White Light/White Heat
- 1. "White Light/White Heat" / "Here She Comes Now" Released: November 1967

White Light/White Heat is the second studio album by the American rock band the Velvet Underground. Released on January 30, 1968, by Verve Records, it was the band's last studio album with multi-instrumentalist and founding member John Cale. Recorded after band leader Lou Reed fired Andy Warhol, who had produced their debut album The Velvet Underground & Nico, they hired Steve Sesnick as their new manager and Tom Wilson, who had worked on the band's debut, to produce the album. White Light/White Heat was engineered by Gary Kellgren.

Like The Velvet Underground & Nico, the album includes lyrically transgressive themes, exploring topics such as sex, amphetamines, and drag queens. Reed was inspired by a variety of authors, including William S. Burroughs and Alice Bailey, and the lyrics create a cast of characters, such as in "The Gift" and "Sister Ray". Musically, he took influence from avant-garde jazz musicians such as Ornette Coleman. Warhol conceived the album's cover art, although he is officially uncredited.

White Light/White Heat was recorded quickly and modeled after the band's live sound and techniques of improvisation, since they often played loud with new equipment from an endorsement deal with Vox. The final product was compressed and distorted as a result; most of the band was dissatisfied with this, and the album was followed with the less experimental The Velvet Underground the following year. Reed had Cale fired later in 1968. The album's extensive use of distortion became a prototype for later punk rock, shoegaze, and noise rock. The 17-minute "Sister Ray" is widely considered the standout track by critics and fans.

White Light/White Heat sold fewer copies than The Velvet Underground & Nico, and peaked at 199 on the Billboard Top LPs chart. The album's only single, "White Light/White Heat", failed to chart, which the band blamed on airplay bans and lack of promotion from Verve. The album was dismissed by many contemporary mainstream music critics, although underground newspapers took notice; ultimately, White Light/White Heat had a significant impact on the development of punk rock and no wave and has appeared on several lists of the greatest albums of all time, including being placed at number 272 on Rolling Stone's list of the "500 Greatest Albums of all Time" in 2020.

== Background ==
After the disappointing sales of the Velvet Underground's first album, The Velvet Underground & Nico (1967), their relationship with Andy Warhol deteriorated. They toured throughout most of 1967, and many of their live performances featured noisy improvisations that would form a model for White Light/White Heat. The band fired Warhol, parted ways with Nico (which she would describe as being fired), and recorded their second album with Tom Wilson credited as producer. Jack Donohue, writing for The Tech (the student newspaper of MIT), would be one of the first to announce that the band were working on a follow-up. The band had access to new equipment through an endorsement deal with Vox. The sound of the album was designed to be a conscious antithesis to the psychedelic Summer of Love in San Francisco and also to capture their live sound.

Steve Sesnick was chosen as the replacement manager for the band, and he was accepted by all band members except John Cale; drummer Moe Tucker even considered him a fifth member of the group. The album was influenced by Lou Reed's obsession with astrology, especially his interest in the Virgo-Pisces astrological opposition. Rehearsal was similar to the band's debut, with the band's best pieces being reworked mostly in the studio. However, Cale would state that no one in the band "had the patience to rehearse" the album, even after numerous attempts to do so.

== Recording ==
Most of the recording was done straight through; 'Sister Ray' was one piece. 'I Heard Her Call My Name' and 'Here She Comes Now' evolved in the studio. We never performed them live. 'The Gift' was a story Lou had written a long time ago when he was at Syracuse University. It was my idea to do it as a spoken-word thing. We had this piece called 'Booker T' that was just an instrumental, so instead of wasting it, we decided to combine them.

— John Cale, Uptight: The Velvet Underground Story

The album was recorded in a short time frame, (Note: The album was recorded quickly, but there is no precise estimate. Richie Unterberger, a researcher for the band, discusses the recording length in his book White Light/White Heat: The Velvet Underground Day-By-Day: "Sesnick later estimates that about three days are spent on recording; [Cale] writes in his autobiography that "it took two to five days consecutively"; and [Tucker], in Up-Tight: The Velvet Underground Story, estimates it involves "seven sessions over a period of two weeks." Cale in an interview told Unterberger that he thought "it was five days".) and with a noticeably different style from that of The Velvet Underground & Nico. Decades after its release, John Cale (in the liner notes of Peel Slowly and See) described White Light/White Heat as "a very rabid record ... The first one had some gentility, some beauty. The second one was consciously anti-beauty." Sterling Morrison recalled: "We were all pulling in the same direction. We may have been dragging each other off a cliff, but we were all definitely going in the same direction." Tucker estimated that the album took two weeks to record across about seven sessions. It was "almost" recorded in one day—the band would not "accommodate what [they] were trying to do due to the limitations of the studio", according to Morrison. They were well prepared, and the tension between Cale and Reed was not apparent in the studio.

White Light/White Heat was recorded in September 1967 at Mayfair Sound Studios on Seventh Avenue in Manhattan, with work to form its songs being done in the previous summer. (Note: Unterberger places the latest start date for recording as September 5.) The band specifically passed on songs that sounded gentler—though Cale also said that the band simply did not have enough songs prepared for recording, which led to a reduced track list. White Light/White Heat would have far more involvement from Wilson, who originally only produced "Sunday Morning" on The Velvet Underground & Nico; however, he would not participate heavily, as he would talk to his girlfriends for most of the studio time.

Reed wanted to go "as high and as hard as we could". At the time, Reed played a 12-string guitar, Gibson, and Epiphone guitars; he also used Vox amplifiers. The band also used Vox distortion pedals to the fullest extent; recording engineer Gary Kellgren reportedly said "you can't do it – all the needles are on red" during the recording sessions. To get the sound of a character receiving a blade through their skull in "The Gift", Reed stabbed or smashed a cantaloupe at the request of Frank Zappa, who was recording in the same studio. For "Sister Ray", the band worked individually instead of coordinating together, and Tucker's drums were drowned out due to the level of noise. The song was recorded in one take to prevent the disjunct sound that the band felt had characterized "Heroin" on the previous record. Tucker was disappointed with the final product, as Wilson forgot to turn on some of her drum microphones while recording. According to Reed, Kellgren walked out during the recording of "Sister Ray" and waited for the band to call him back in after they were done playing.

"I Heard Her Call My Name" was remixed by Reed after the recording process to boost his vocals, which Tucker said ruined the sound of the song. Morrison considered the album a technical failure, additionally citing "I Heard Her Call My Name"; he would quit the band for several days in response. While mixing the album, Reed discovered extensive distortion since the band played too loudly, which they did not have enough studio time to resolve. Cale said the band had not considered how playing at such a volume would affect the technical quality of the record, and Morrison concluded that it was "doomed" due to its level of distortion and compression. Before its release, Wilson resigned from MGM Records, the owner of the band's label at the time, and would never work with the band again.

== Content ==
White Light/White Heat has been described as experimental rock, noise rock, proto-punk and art rock. Record Mirror called it a "menacing set of acid-rock tunes." "White Heat", at the time, was a slang term for the high obtained from amphetamine use. Reed's lyrics vary from themes of drug use to sexual references (such as fellatio and orgies); the title track "White Light/White Heat" implies intravenous use of methamphetamine. "Here She Comes Now" is built around a double-entendre. On the album's last track, "Sister Ray", Reed tells a tale of debauchery involving drag queens having a failed orgy. Reed later considered "Sister Ray" ahead of its time, anticipating heavy metal.

=== Side one ===
The record opens with "White Light/White Heat" which details the physical effects of amphetamine usage. It consists of a simple two-chord progression of G5 and D5, and contains elements of both heavy metal and doo-wop. It is one of the album's songs that has more traditional rock elements; while primarily discussing drug use, it is also influenced by one of Reed's favorite books, occultist Alice Bailey's A Treatise on White Magic, which inspired the phrase "White Light". Reed was interviewed by a radio station in Oregon, which Richie Unterberger summarizes:

[Reed]'s recently been investigating a Japanese form of healing in Los Angeles that's "a way of giving off white light ... I've been involved and interested in what they call white light for a long time." He briefly discusses Alice Bailey and her occult book A Treatise On White Magic ... "It costs like ten dollars, unfortunately," he notes apologetically.

"The Gift" is a spoken word track whose lyrics and musical backing are separated into the left and right stereo channels, described by Wilson as the band having "stereo prefrontal lobes". Cale reads a short story derived from one that Reed wrote for Shelley Albin, his middle school girlfriend, while at Syracuse University. It discusses two characters, Marsha and Waldo, over a feedback-heavy blues rock improvisation. This would be Cale's first vocal performance for the band, and it showed the group's improvisational roots.

The lyrical style of "Lady Godiva's Operation" was influenced by Beat Generation writer William S. Burroughs. Partially inspired by his teenage experiences with electroconvulsive therapy, the track is another of Reed's short stories set to music, but is more instrumentally complex than "The Gift". Cale provides lead vocals alongside Reed, and he and Sterling Morrison shuddered and imitated the sounds of an oxygen machine while recording the track.

The title of "Here She Comes Now" is a double entendre referring to an orgasm. The song was originally written to be sung by Nico before the band fell out with her. It is the band's only song jointly credited to Reed, Cale, and Morrison.

=== Side two ===
"Sister Ray"
A sample of "Sister Ray," which contains Cale's heavily distorted organ against Tucker's drumbeat. Reed sings sexually explicit lyrics throughout the instrumental backing.

"I Heard Her Call My Name" is a love song for a dead girl. Reed's guitar playing was inspired by Jimi Hendrix, and the song has been described as influenced by free jazz, with "banshee-like guitar breaks" by Unterberger. It has elements of garage rock, while Reed's guitar solo was influenced by avant-garde jazz saxophonist Ornette Coleman. Reed biographer Howard Sounes summarized the track as "[Tucker] maintaining a frantic beat as [Reed] delivered a speed rap ending with a mind-splitting guitar solo".

"Sister Ray"

Reed said in a Rolling Stone interview that "Sister Ray" was included at the suggestion of Warhol, who asked that he "gotta make sure that you do the 'sucking on my ding-dong' song". (Note: Bockris and Gerard Malanga, two biographers of the band, say that the only contribution Warhol provided for the album was its cover art.) The track was written on a train home from a poor performance in Connecticut. Reed explained the song as concerning "a bunch of drag queens taking some sailors home with them, shooting up on smack and having this orgy when the police appear". The song is titled after a drag queen mentioned in the lyrics, who was named as a nod to Ray Davies of the Kinks. The mostly-improvised song also reflects Reed's interest in Coleman and free jazz pianist Cecil Taylor. Wilson had produced Taylor's debut album Jazz Advance in 1956. The song tells this story through a cast of characters, which Soumes described as typical of Reed's writing in that it constitutes "a semi-abstract story with use of repetition and drug slang, also playing with the sounds of words, stuttering and jamming words together". Soumes also noted that it contains similar themes to two of Reed's favorite novels, Hubert Selby Jr.'s Last Exit to Brooklyn (1964) and John Rechy's City of Night (1963). The instrumental jam was spontaneous, as Reed had desired. The song has no bass guitar, with both Reed and Morrison playing guitar and Cale playing a Vox Continental organ. Tucker would state that it was more than just noise, as everyone playing still followed her beat. The third verse contains explicit references, particularly in the line(s) "She's just suckin' on my ding dong/I'm searchin' for my mainline".

== Release ==
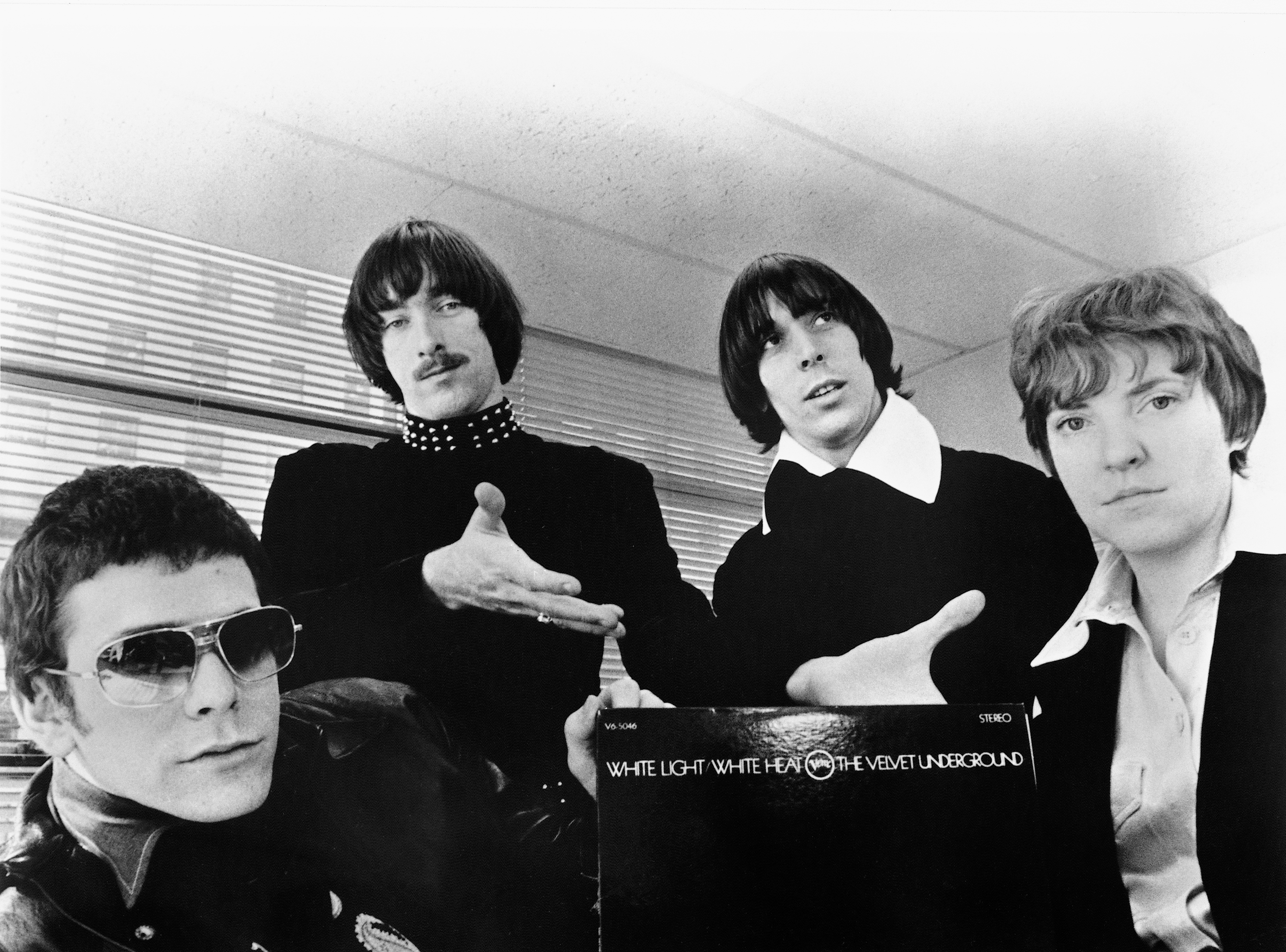
A publicity photo of the band holding a copy of the album, c. 1968. From left to right: Reed, Morrison, Cale, and Tucker.

The title track "White Light/White Heat" was released as a single in November 1967 but failed commercially. The B-side was "Here She Comes Now"; these tracks are the two shortest tracks on the album. The band claimed that it was banned in San Francisco—Reed said that this was because of the former's references to drugs and the latter's references to sex.

The album was released on January 30, 1968. The original pressing of the record incorrectly listed the track "Here She Comes Now" as "There She Comes Now". Initially, the band had a high ego after its release, but were nevertheless disappointed by its lack of promotion from MGM. Like the band's debut, it was banned on radio and was a commercial disappointment. It spent two weeks on the Billboard Top LPs chart, peaking at number 199, a lower position than the band's debut album.

Although the band was disappointed in Verve and MGM's lack of promotion, Verve nevertheless ran a full-page ad in Rolling Stone and various ads in underground newspapers, including a full-page ad in Hullabaloo, a teen magazine. Verve also ran radio ads advertising "The Gift" and used the band's history with Warhol as a selling point. MGM included songs from the album as a part of a promotional set of interviews and songs—the set includes an interview with the band members. Bockris, another biographer of Reed's, said that the reaction to it was "even harsher ... than the first", with particular criticism directed towards its transgressive lyrics. The band had difficulties distributing the single "White Light/White Heat" and received the most revenue through touring. They also had difficulties attracting larger audiences, even after appearing at Warhol's Exploding Plastic Inevitable events. Ultimately, growing tension between Reed and Cale led to Cale being fired from the band at Reed's behest.

== Cover artwork ==
The cover is a black-on-black picture of a motorcyclist tattoo [sic] by Billy. Beautiful. ALL BLACK!

— Lou Reed, Letter to Gerard Malanga

The original album cover for White Light/White Heat is a faint image of a tattoo of a skull. The tattoo was that of Joe Spencer, who played the lead role in Warhol's 1967 film Bike Boy. Spencer starred as a hustler in a motorcycle gang and is seen taking a shower in the movie. Although he was not credited for the cover design as with their debut, it was Warhol's idea to use a black-on-black picture of the tattoo. Reed selected the image from the negatives from the film, and it was enlarged and distorted by Billy Name of the Factory. Morrison, however, states that the cover was picked by him. On the physical version of the album, this can only be seen when viewing the cover from a certain angle. On the back of the album is a photo of the band members at the Boston Tea Party, a concert venue in Boston. Morrison chose the photo and liked it, while Tucker thought that both she and Reed looked terrible on it.

There also exists a unique MGM Records UK cover, made in 1971, featuring a white background and abstract toy soldiers. The UK cover was not authorized by the band members. In 1974, the album was reissued by MGM under the title Archetypes. The cover of this version features two men wearing helmets standing in front of a Woolworth's.

== Reception ==
Contemporary professional ratings
Review scores
Source	Rating
Record Mirror	4/5 stars

Like other releases by the group, the lyrical themes and avant-garde instrumentation of White Light/White Heat did not resonate with mainstream audiences at the time. For example, Rolling Stone refused to review the record. Though Billboard predicted that the album would become a hot-seller for record stores catering to underground acts, it only briefly appeared on the Billboard Top LPs chart. For Record Mirror, Peter Jones and Norman Jopling called it "a hippy must", with repetitive, "growling" blues-style instrumentation and deadpan vocals. The reviewers singled out "Sister Ray" as "behemoth" while comparing "The Gift" to Dylan Thomas' radio drama Under Milk Wood. A reviewer for Billboard called the lyrics "interesting" and the narrative-heavy songs such as "The Gift" joyful, albeit drowned out by the "pulsating instrumentation". Melody Maker, on the other hand, wrote off the album as "utterly pretentious, unbelievably monotonous". Peter Reilly of HiFi/Stereo Review, while erroneously describing the album's release as headed by Warhol, assigned the album ratings of "fair" for recording, "distinct" for stereo quality, and "not so good" for performance.

Wayne McGuire, writing for The Boston Sound, praised Cale's bass playing, particularly on "White Light/White Heat", calling him one of the best contemporary bass players. McGuire also considered the album a symbol of progression for the band. Sandy Pearlman, writing for Crawdaddy, noted its technological and "mechanical" sound while questioning why Warhol wasn't credited for contributing to its cover. The Listener's Tim Souster praised "Sister Ray", saying the track shows "pop is at last making decisive steps in a direction with far-reaching implications for the creative development not only of pop itself but of 'serious' music too". Internationally, Dutch magazine HitWeek gave the album a positive review, while noting its poor sound quality. British magazine NME noted its short track list and called it "weirdo stuff". Disc found it to be "staggering". A detailed review by Gene Youngblood in the underground newspaper Los Angeles Free Press praised the album, declaring it unique and ahead of its time like the band's debut. Lenny Kaye of New Times said the cover artwork could be juxtaposed with that of The Velvet Underground & Nico.

== Legacy ==
Retrospective professional ratings
Review scores
Source	Rating
AllMusic	5/5 stars
Chicago Tribune	3.5/4 stars
The Encyclopedia of Popular Music	4/5 stars
The Guardian	5/5 stars
Pitchfork	10/10
Record Collector	5/5 stars
Rolling Stone	4/5 stars
The Rolling Stone Album Guide	5/5 stars
Spin Alternative Record Guide	9/10
Uncut	10/10

Retrospective reviews have been much more positive, and White Light/White Heat eventually sold over half a million copies internationally before Reed's death in 2013.

David Fricke of Rolling Stone, in a 1985 review of the first three records of the band, said it stood out even compared with contemporary songs, stating that no wave and hardcore songs didn't meet its "sheer industrial discord and locomotive propulsion". Reviewing the deluxe edition of the record, Douglas Wolk of Pitchfork labeled it a "best new reissue". Walk called the album "mysterious" and "a relentless, screeching, thudding, scoffing assault on the pop sensibilities of its time". Thomas Hobbs, in a review for Crack, praised its production but was divided on its lyrics, saying they "make it a record that's a lot harder to love; perhaps that was the aim all along".

Other reviews praised the album's abrasive production. Mark Deming of AllMusic considered it "easily the least accessible" of the band's albums, saying: "anyone wanting to hear their guitar-mauling tribal frenzy straight with no chaser will love it, and those benighted souls who think of the Velvets as some sort of folk-rock band are advised to crank their stereo up to ten and give side two a spin." Greg Kot of Chicago Tribune described the album as "Loud, abrasive, chilling-the perfect antidote for the Age of Aquarius." The Guardian singled out the track "Sister Ray," saying the only appropriate sound to follow the "brutal improvisational workout ... is silence". Record Collector contended that it "was as near as the VU ever got to sounding trippily à la mode in 1967–68, even if it remains as streaked with street dirt as a discarded pie." Unterberger said the album was perhaps the "loudest ... of all time."

White Light/White Heat contains a distorted, feedback-driven, and roughly recorded sound, which is regarded as influential; it foreshadowed the start of punk rock and the no wave genre. The Social Distortion album White Light, White Heat, White Trash (1996) would be named after White Light/White Heat. Oregano Rathbone of uDiscoverMusic said the record signalled a significant turn in rock music and for the band; similarly, Mike Boehm of the Los Angeles Times considered it a "raw, brutal milestone in the development of what would become punk rock". Joe Viglione of AllMusic cited it as an influence on grunge.

Tracks from the record were covered by underground and contemporary artists. English punk band Buzzcocks were formed by Pete Shelley and Howard Devoto out of their shared interest in "Sister Ray". A live cover of "Sister Ray" by English post-punk band Joy Division, recorded at the Moonlight Club in London on April 2, 1980, was included on the band's 1981 compilation album Still. "Roadrunner" by the Modern Lovers, from their Cale-produced 1976 self-titled album, is heavily indebted to "Sister Ray"; influential in its own right, the song was ranked on Rolling Stone's 500 Greatest Songs of All Time. David Bowie performed the album's title track routinely after May 1973, and Nirvana covered "Here She Comes Now" in 1990. Reed later boasted that "no group in the world can touch what we did" on the album.

=== Rankings ===
White Light/White Heat has been included in several lists by music publications as one of the greatest albums of the 1960s decade and of all time. It was listed at number 292 on Rolling Stone magazine's 2003 list of The 500 Greatest Albums of All Time, with the ranking slipping to number 293 in the 2012 revision and climbing to number 272 in the 2020 edition. It was voted number 309 in the third edition of Colin Larkin's All Time Top 1000 Albums (2000). Pitchfork ranked it at number 26 on its 2017 list of the 200 best albums of the 1960s. NME ranked it number 89 in its inaugural 1974 list of the top 100 albums of all time, and as number 352 on its 2013 list of the 500 Greatest Albums of All Time. The album has been listed in unranked "best of" lists, such as Ultimate Classic Rock's top 100 albums of the 1960s. NME additionally included it on its "101 Albums To Hear Before You Die". The French music magazine Rock & Folk included it in its list of the 555 best albums from 1954–2014, and the Italian magazine Ondarock listed it as a rock milestone.

Robert Dimery included the album in the 2018 edition of his book 1001 Albums You Must Hear Before You Die.

=== Covers and homages ===
Many artists have covered songs from White Light/White Heat, both live and in the studio. These covers range from one-off live performances, to regular inclusions across multiple concerts, to fully-produced studio songs and albums.

David Bowie often covered "White Light/White Heat" during live shows. In 1983, he released a cover of "White Light..." as a single to promote the live album Ziggy Stardust: The Motion Picture. The song has also been covered by Mick Ronson and Julian Casablancas. A cover of the song, by Nick Cave and Warren Ellis, was featured on the soundtrack for the movie Lawless.

Nirvana and Melvins covered two Velvet songs, "Here She Comes Now" and "Venus in Furs" respectively, on a split 7" single. Nirvana's cover was recorded at Split Studios in Madison, Wisconsin, in 1990. "Here She Comes Now" was also covered by Cabaret Voltaire and Galaxie 500.

A live version of "Sister Ray" was included on the Joy Division compilation, Still.

A full-album cover of White Light/White Heat was recorded and released by Jasper Patrick Leach in 2012. Tracks from this album were included in the Bandcamp project "Your Weekly Velvet Underground Cover Songs", which anthologized covers of the band's music from 2015 to 2016.

== Reissues ==
The album was reissued as Archetypes by MGM in 1974, though the reason for the change in title is unknown. It was out of print in the United States until 1985, when it received a reissue, along with the group's first three albums. These reissues were unexpectedly successful, which led to further releases under PolyGram, such as the outtake compilation Another View. The album was included in the band's 1995 retrospective box set Peel Slowly and See, and was later reissued as a "Super Deluxe" edition for its 45th anniversary in 2013, including mono versions of tracks, demos, and live performances.

== Track listing ==
All lyrics are written by Lou Reed.

Side one
No.	Title	Music	Lead vocals	Length
1.	"White Light/White Heat"	Reed	Reed	2:47
2.	"The Gift"	Reed; Sterling Morrison; John Cale; Maureen Tucker	Cale	8:18
3.	"Lady Godiva's Operation"	Reed	Cale/Reed	4:56
4.	"Here She Comes Now"	Reed; Morrison; Cale; Tucker	Reed	2:04
Total length:				18:05

Side two
No.	Title	Music	Lead vocals	Length
1.	"I Heard Her Call My Name"	Reed	Reed	4:38
2.	"Sister Ray"	Reed; Morrison; Cale; Tucker	Reed	17:28
Total length:				22:06

== Personnel ==
Derived from journalist David Fricke and the album's back cover.

The Velvet Underground

- Lou Reed – vocals, guitars, sound effects; piano (1)
- John Cale – vocals, sound effects; bass guitar (1, 2, 5), electric viola (3, 4), Vox Continental organ (6)
- Sterling Morrison – vocals, sound effects; guitars (1, 2, 5, 6), bass guitar (3, 4)
- Maureen Tucker – percussion, drums

Technical

- Gary Kellgren – engineer
- Bob Ludwig – mastering engineer
- Val Valentin – director of engineering
- Tom Wilson – producer

== Certifications ==
Region	Certification	Certified units/sales
United Kingdom (BPI)	Silver	60,000^{‡}
^{‡} Sales+streaming figures based on certification alone.
