= The Velvet Underground & Nico =

Studio album by the Velvet Underground and Nico
- Released: March 1967 (Note: The album's exact release date is uncertain. Some sources do not specify beyond March 1967, while others date it to March 12. Richie Unterberger writes it was released by March 4 at the latest, and possibly "a little before March".)
- Recorded: April, May and November 1966
- Studios: Scepter and Mayfair, New York City; TTG, Hollywood
- Genres: Art rock; proto-punk; experimental rock; avant-pop; psychedelic rock
- Length: 47:51
- Label: Verve
- Producers: Andy Warhol; Tom Wilson

The Velvet Underground chronology
The Velvet Underground & Nico (1967)	White Light/White Heat (1968)

Nico chronology
The Velvet Underground & Nico (1967)	Chelsea Girl (1967)

Singles from The Velvet Underground & Nico
- 1. "All Tomorrow's Parties" / "I'll Be Your Mirror" Released: July 1966; 2. "Sunday Morning" / "Femme Fatale" Released: December 1966; 3. "I'm Waiting for the Man" / "There She Goes Again" Released: October 1971

Alternative cover
- The early LP edition with the banana-skin sticker peeled off

The Velvet Underground & Nico is the debut studio album by the American rock band the Velvet Underground and the German singer Nico, released by Verve Records in March 1967. The album was recorded in 1966 on Ludlow Street, New York while the band were featured on Andy Warhol's Exploding Plastic Inevitable tour. Warhol, who designed the album's record sleeve, served as co-producer alongside Tom Wilson.

The Velvet Underground & Nico features elements of avant-garde music incorporated into brash, minimal and groove-driven rock music. Lead singer and songwriter Lou Reed delivers explicit lyrics spanning themes of drug abuse, prostitution, sadomasochism and urban life. Due to its abrasive, unconventional sound and controversial lyrical content, the album underperformed commercially and polarized critics upon release. Various record stores banned the album, many radio stations refused to play it, and magazines refused to carry advertisements for it.

In the following decades, The Velvet Underground & Nico received widespread critical acclaim, being regarded as ahead of its time, and was included on numerous all-time best album lists. The Observer placed it at No. 1 in their list of the "50 Albums That Changed Music" and Pitchfork ranked it as the best album of the 1960s. It has been characterized as the original art-rock record, influencing many subgenres of rock and alternative music, including punk, garage rock, krautrock, post-punk, post-rock, noise rock, shoegaze, gothic rock, art punk, and indie rock.

The Velvet Underground & Nico continues to be lauded as one of the most important albums in rock and pop music. In 2006, it was inducted into the National Recording Registry by the Library of Congress for being "culturally, historically, or aesthetically significant". In 2008, it was inducted into the Grammy Hall of Fame, honoring recordings of "lasting qualitative or historical significance". Despite its poor sales, the album is certified platinum in the United Kingdom for sales of over 300,000 copies. In 2023, Billboard ranked the album No. 1 on its list of "The 100 Best Album Covers of All Time."

== Recording ==
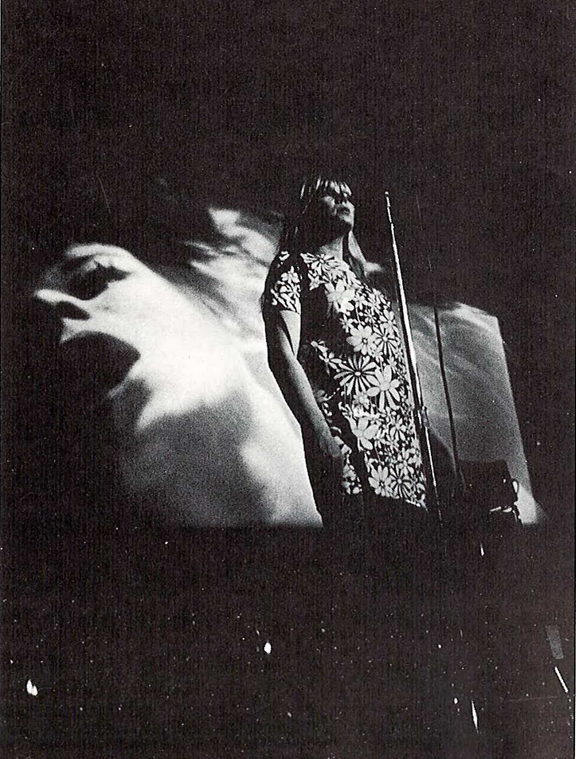
Nico sang lead vocals on three tracks, including the single "All Tomorrow's Parties".

The Velvet Underground & Nico was recorded in a rehearsal studio on Ludlow Street, New York. It was recorded with the first professional line-up of the Velvet Underground, consisting of guitarist and vocalist Lou Reed; violist, keyboardist, and bassist John Cale; guitarist and bassist Sterling Morrison; and drummer Maureen Tucker. At the instigation of their mentor and manager Andy Warhol and his collaborator Paul Morrissey, German singer Nico was also featured; she had occasionally performed lead vocals for the band. She sang lead on three of the album's tracks—"Femme Fatale", "All Tomorrow's Parties" and "I'll Be Your Mirror"—and back-up on "Sunday Morning". In 1966, as the album was being recorded, this was also the line-up for the band's live performances as a part of Warhol's Exploding Plastic Inevitable.

The bulk of the songs that would become The Velvet Underground & Nico were recorded in four days in mid-April 1966 at Scepter Studios in Manhattan. This was financed by Warhol and Columbia Records sales executive Norman Dolph, who also co-engineered the sessions with John Licata. Rather than a cash fee, Dolph asked for one of Warhol's paintings and was given a silver "Death and Disaster Series" canvas; he sold it around 1975 for $17,000, remarking, "I bet Lou Reed hasn't made $17,000 from this album yet." The cost of the project is unknown; estimates vary from $1,500 (equivalent to $14,885 in 2025) to $3,000 (equivalent to $29,769 in 2025).

Dolph sent an acetate disc of the recordings to Columbia Records in an attempt to interest them in distributing the album, but they declined, as did Atlantic Records and Elektra Records. According to Morrison, Atlantic objected to the songs' drug references, while Elektra disliked Cale's viola. Finally, the MGM Records-owned Verve Records accepted the recordings, with the help of Verve staff producer Tom Wilson, who had recently moved from a job at Columbia.

In May 1966, three songs ("I'm Waiting for the Man", "Venus in Furs", and "Heroin") were re-recorded in two days at TTG Studios in Hollywood. When the record's release date was postponed, Wilson brought the band to Mayfair Recording Studios in Manhattan in November 1966 to add a final song to the album: the single "Sunday Morning".

== Production ==
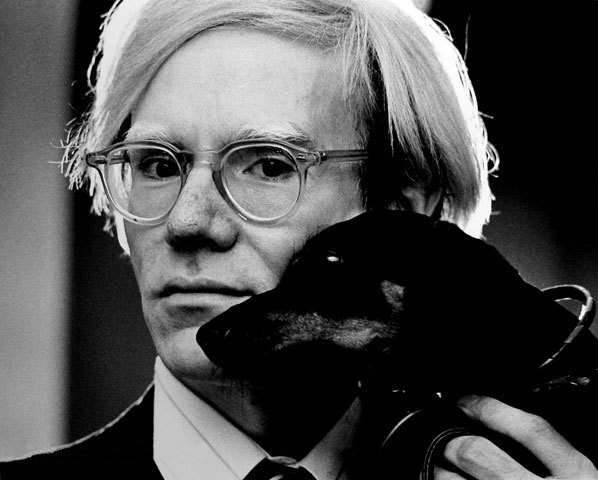
Artist Andy Warhol designed the album's cover.

Although Andy Warhol is the only formally credited producer on the album, he had little influence beyond paying for the recording sessions. Several others who worked on the album are often mentioned as the technical producer.

Recording engineers Norman Dolph and John Licata are sometimes cited as producing the Scepter Studios sessions, though neither is credited as such on the album. Dolph said that Cale was the group's creative producer, as he handled the majority of the arrangements. However, Cale recalled that Tom Wilson produced nearly all the tracks, and said that Warhol "didn't do anything". Reed also said the "real producer" of the album was Wilson. Reed claimed it was MGM who decided to bring in Wilson, and credited him for producing songs such as "Sunday Morning": "Andy absorbed all the flak. Then MGM said they wanted to bring in a real producer, Tom Wilson. So that's how you got 'Sunday Morning', with all those overdubs—the viola in the back, Nico chanting. But he couldn't undo what had already been done."

However, Sterling Morrison and Lou Reed both cited Warhol's approach as a legitimate method of production. Morrison described Warhol as the producer "in the sense of producing a film". Reed said:

He just made it possible for us to be ourselves and go right ahead with it because he was Andy Warhol. In a sense, he really did produce it, because he was this umbrella that absorbed all the attacks when we weren't large enough to be attacked ... and as a consequence of him being the producer, we'd just walk in and set up and do what we always did and no one would stop it because Andy was the producer. Of course he didn't know anything about record production—but he didn't have to. He just sat there and said "Oooh, that's fantastic," and the engineer would say, "Oh yeah! Right! It is fantastic, isn't it?"

== Music and lyrics ==
"I'm Waiting for the Man"
The second track of The Velvet Underground & Nico. The percussive, "barrelhouse"-style piano is heard behind Lou Reed's descriptive lyrics. This sample contains the first verse.

"Venus in Furs"
The fourth track from The Velvet Underground & Nico. The droning electric viola accompanies the "ostrich"-tuned guitar. This sample contains the second verse.

=== Lyrics ===
The Velvet Underground & Nico was notable for its overt descriptions of topics such as drug abuse, prostitution, sadomasochism, and sexual deviancy. "I'm Waiting for the Man" describes a protagonist's efforts to obtain heroin, while "Venus in Furs" is a nearly literal interpretation of the novella of the same name by Leopold von Sacher-Masoch, which itself prominently features accounts of sadomasochistic practices. "Heroin" details an individual's use of the drug and the experience of feeling its effects.

Lou Reed, who wrote the majority of the album's lyrics, never intended to write about such topics for shock value. Reed, a fan of poets and authors such as Raymond Chandler, Nelson Algren, William S. Burroughs, Allen Ginsberg, and Hubert Selby, Jr., saw no reason the content in their works could not translate well to rock music. An English major who studied at Syracuse University, Reed said in an interview that he thought joining gritty subject matter and music was "obvious": "That's the kind of stuff you might read. Why wouldn't you listen to it? You have the fun of reading that, and you get the fun of rock on top of it."

Though the album's dark subject matter is today considered revolutionary, several of the album's songs are centered on themes more typical of popular music. Certain songs were written by Reed as observations of Andy Warhol's "superstars". "Femme Fatale" in particular was written about Edie Sedgwick at Warhol's request. "I'll Be Your Mirror", inspired by Nico, is a tender and affectionate song, in stark contrast to a song like "Heroin". A common misperception is that "All Tomorrow's Parties" was written by Reed at Warhol's request (as stated in Victor Bockris and Gerard Malanga's Velvet Underground biography Up-Tight: The Velvet Underground Story); while the song does seem to be another observation of the denizens of the Factory, Reed wrote the song before meeting Warhol, having recorded a demo in July 1965 at Ludlow Street.

=== Instrumentation and performance ===
"Heroin"
The seventh track from The Velvet Underground & Nico. As the song nears its final crescendo, the percussion quickens and the electric viola produces feedback.

The Velvet Underground & Nico has generally been described by writers as art rock, experimental rock, proto-punk, psychedelic rock, and avant-pop. Much of the album's sound was conceived by John Cale, who stressed the experimental qualities of the band. He was influenced greatly by his work with minimalist composer La Monte Young in the Theatre of Eternal Music, John Cage, and the Fluxus arts movement, and encouraged the use of alternative ways of producing sound. Cale thought his sensibilities meshed well with Reed's, who was already experimenting with alternate tunings. For instance, Reed had "invented" the ostrich guitar tuning for a song he wrote called "The Ostrich" for the short-lived band the Primitives. Ostrich guitar tuning consists of all strings being tuned to the same pitch class. This method was utilized on the songs "Venus in Furs" and "All Tomorrow's Parties". Reed and Morrison's guitars were often tuned down a whole step, which produced a lower, fuller sound that Cale considered "sexy".

Cale performed on the viola on several of the album's songs, notably "Venus in Furs" and "The Black Angel's Death Song". Cale strung his viola with guitar and mandolin strings, and when played loudly, Cale would liken its brash sound to that of an airplane engine. Cale's technique usually involved minimalist drones, detuning for an eerie, surreal effect, and distortion to highlight harmonics and transform the instrument's sound. According to critic Robert Christgau, Cale's "narcotic drone" not only sustains the sadomasochism-themed "Venus in Furs", but also "identifies and unifies the [album] musically". Of the vocal performances, he believed "Nico's contained chantoozy sexuality" complemented "the dispassionate abandon of Reed's chant singing". In 1966, Richard Goldstein described Nico's vocal as "something like a cello getting up in the morning".

Tucker's style of drumming on the album involved her playing standing up rather than sitting down, playing bass drums and tambourines on their sides with a drumstick in her left hand and a mallet in her right hand, resulting in "a mix of African trance rhythms and Ringo-like arrangement genius" according to Adam Budofsky of Modern Drummer. Tucker's predecessor Angus MacLise had informed her style, influencing her into playing "pounding" rhythms that fit with, in her words, "the ominous mood" of several of the album's songs.

== Artwork ==
The album cover for The Velvet Underground & Nico is widely recognized for its Andy Warhol–designed banana image, which incorporated an interactive element: early pressings featured a peelable sticker bearing the instruction "Peel slowly and see," revealing a flesh-colored banana beneath. A special machine was needed to manufacture these covers, one of the causes of the album's delayed release, but MGM paid for costs figuring that any ties to Warhol would boost sales of the album. Most reissued vinyl editions of the album do not feature the peel-off sticker; original copies of the album with the peel-sticker feature are now considered rare collector's items. A Japanese re-issue LP in the early 1980s was the only re-issue version to include the banana sticker for many years. On the 1996 CD reissue, the banana image is on the front cover while the image of the peeled banana is on the inside of the jewel case, beneath the CD itself. The album was re-pressed onto heavyweight vinyl in 2008, featuring a banana sticker seen on original versions.

Sources have often cited the cover art as a phallic symbol. In the 2006 documentary The Velvet Underground: Under Review, one commentator remarks:

"The album cover [...] is fun, it's a fun record. That's not to say it wasn't calculated. It's a banana—what does it look like? It looks like a penis, right? It's a big penis on a record. And then the temptation to peel this off—'Oh, what is underneath?'—and you're expecting something really nasty and dirty, and then, oh, you know what it is? It's a pink banana underneath. Right? Gotcha!"

Warhol biographer Blake Gopnik has compared the act of peeling the banana sticker to the peeling back of a foreskin, arguing that the jacket "aligned the Velvets with the hard-edged queer culture that the Factory was coming to represent." Reflecting on the cover’s provocation, the band's frontman Lou Reed later remarked, "The banana actually made it into an erotic art show."

In 2023, Billboard ranked The Velvet Underground & Nico at the top of its list of The 100 Best Album Covers of All Time.

=== Back cover lawsuit ===
Reproduction of original back cover

When the album was first issued, the main back cover photo of the band (taken at one of Warhol's Exploding Plastic Inevitable events) contained an image of actor Eric Emerson projected upside-down on the wall behind the band. Having recently been arrested for drug possession and desperate for money, Emerson threatened to sue over this unauthorized use of his image unless he was paid. Rather than complying, MGM recalled copies of the album and halted its distribution until Emerson's image could be airbrushed from the photo on subsequent pressings. Copies that had already been printed were sold with a large black sticker covering the actor's image.

=== Front cover lawsuit ===
In January 2012, the "Velvet Underground" business partnership (of which John Cale and Lou Reed were general partners) sued the Andy Warhol Foundation for the Visual Arts, Inc. in the United States District Court for the Southern District of New York after the Foundation licensed the cover's banana design to Incase Designs for use on a line of iPhone and iPad cases. The complaint involved copyright infringement, trademark infringement and unfair competition.

Alleging that the Foundation had earlier claimed it "may" own the design's copyright, the partnership asked the court for a declaratory judgment that the Foundation did not have such rights. In response, the Foundation gave the partnership a "Covenant Not to Sue"—a written and binding promise that, even if the partnership and certain other parties continued to use the design commercially, the Foundation would never invoke its professed copyright ownership against them in court.

On the Foundation's motion, Judge Alison J. Nathan severed and dismissed from the lawsuit the partnership's copyright claim. According to Judge Nathan, the Constitution allows federal courts to decide only "Cases" or "Controversies", which means ongoing or imminent disputes over legal rights, involving concrete facts and specific acts, that require court intervention in order to shield the plaintiff from harm or interference with its rights. The judge held that the partnership's complaint fell short of that standard because even if the Foundation continued to claim ownership of the design's copyright—and even if its claim was invalid—that claim would not legally harm the partnership or prevent it from making its own lawful uses of the design. The partnership did not claim that it owned the design's copyright, only that the Foundation did not. Since, according to the court, the Foundation promised not to sue the partnership for any "potentially copyright-infringing uses of the Banana Design", the partnership could continue using the design and there would be no legal action that the Foundation could take (under copyright law) (Note: Note, however, that the language of the covenant covers only copyright lawsuits and claims; it does not cover trademark or unfair competition claims, which, as noted below, the Foundation has indeed filed against the Partnership.) to stop it. And if, the court concluded, the partnership could continue with business as usual (as far as copyright was concerned) regardless of whether the Foundation actually owned the design's copyright, a court decision would have no practical consequences for the partnership; it would be a purely academic (or "advisory") opinion, which federal courts may not issue. The court therefore "dismissed without prejudice" the partnership's request that it resolve whether the Foundation owned the design's copyright. The remaining trademark claims were settled out of court with a confidential agreement, and the partnership's suit was dismissed in late May 2013.

== Reception and sales ==
=== Chart history and sales figures ===
The album's exact release date is uncertain. Some sources do not specify beyond March 1967, while others date it to March 12. The author Richie Unterberger describes the latter date as "probably [erroneous]"; he instead suggests it was likely out by March 4 at the latest, adding there is evidence that some copies were possibly on sale "a little before March". (Note: Billboard magazine listed the album in its "new release inventory checklist" on January 28, 1967. That same day, Cashbox magazine included the album's cover and catalogue number in an ad for new Verve releases. By early March, numerous daily newspapers across the United States had provided small reviews and mentions of the album, indicating promo copies were circulating. Unterberger writes that an ad for the album in the March 4 issue of Cashbox provides the album's latest possible release date.)

Upon release, The Velvet Underground & Nico was a commercial failure. The album's controversial content led to its almost instantaneous ban from various record stores, many radio stations refused to play it, and magazines refused to carry advertisements for it. Its lack of success can also be attributed to Verve, who failed to promote or distribute the album with anything but modest attention. However, Richie Unterberger of AllMusic also notes that:

... the music was simply too daring to fit onto commercial radio; "underground" rock radio was barely getting started at this point, and in any case may well have overlooked the record at a time when psychedelic music was approaching its peak.

The album first entered the Billboard album charts on May 13, 1967, at number 199 and left the charts on June 10, 1967, at number 195. When Verve recalled the album in June due to Eric Emerson's lawsuit, it disappeared from the charts for five months. It then re-entered the charts on November 18, 1967, at number 182, peaked at number 171 on December 16, 1967, and finally left the charts on January 6, 1968, at number 193.

The English musician Brian Eno stated in 1982 that while the album only sold approximately 30,000 copies in its first five years, "everyone who bought one of those 30,000 copies started a band". At times the figure has been distorted to 10,000 copies. Writers often erroneously use this quotation as a definitive figure for how many copies of The Velvet Underground & Nico were sold in the first several years. While it indeed sold less than Warhol and the band had hoped, according to a MGM royalty statement presented to Jeff Gold, a former Warner Bros. Records executive, 58,476 copies of the album were sold in February 1969. In 2021, Grant McPhee, a filmmaker and writer, conducted an investigation into Eno's claim, citing 23 pressings of the album in 1967 alone, as well as a claim by Sterling Morrison that the album had sold 200,000 copies by 1970.

=== Contemporary reception ===
A capsule review from Billboard published ahead of the album's release praised the "haunting" vocals of Nico and the "powerful" lyrics of the band, calling it a collection of "sophisticated folk-rock" and a "left-fielder which could click in a big way." Vibrations, a small rock music magazine, gave the album a mostly positive review in their second issue, describing the music as "a full-fledged attack on the ears and on the brain" while noting the dark lyrics. Wayne Harada of the Honolulu Advertiser and Dave Donelly of the Honolulu Star-Bulletin both praised the album's banana-sticker cover; the former terming it "the wildest" front cover of any album yet and the latter calling it a conversation piece. Harada wrote: "Inside, the eating's good, too: 'Sunday Morning' has a definite psychedelic hit sound. 'Run Run Run' still is another Underground gem gaining ground." Donelly called the album "not Commercial with a capital 'C' but an experience in sound." An anonymous reviewer in the American Record Guide praised Reed's lyrics as "penetratingly contemporary", comparing them to the work of Dylan while calling Reed on the basis of the record "an important new (to me) talent". The reviewer also praised the variety in sounds presented by "Sunday Morning", "European Son", and "Heroin" alongside from the more Dylan-esque songs.

Meanwhile, Richard Goldstein of the Village Voice, published in Velvet Underground's hometown of New York City, was more reserved in his praise. Goldstein called "There She Goes Again" a "blatant" lift of the Rolling Stones rendition of "Hitch Hike" and called Reed's vocal performances on other songs "distressingly like early Dylan". However he ultimately wrote that "the Velvets are an important group and this album has some major work [within]", singling out "I'm Waiting for the Man", "Venus in Furs", "Femme Fatale", and "Heroin". Of the latter song, Goldstein wrote:

[It] is more compressed, more restrained than live performances I have seen. But it's also more a realized work. The tempo fluctuates wildly and finally breaks into a series of utterly terrifying squeals, like the death rattle of a suffocating violin. "Heroin" is seven minutes of genuine 12-tone rock 'n' roll.

The Tampa Tribune writer Vance Johnston dismissed it as a collection of "several confusing sounds ... most depressing and whatever the message I failed to get" but wrote that Warhol aficionados would declare it his best "at any rate". Don Lass of New Jersey's Asbury Park Evening Press was similarly dismissive, finding the music "as lifeless and inanimate as the discarded banana peel, touching every cliche in the rock 'n' roll spectrum while missing the genuine fun that good big-beat renderings can offer." A staff writer for the Pensacola News Journal defined the album overall as "one big savage sound", with its lyrics "equally frenzied": "The result sounds like the merger of Dracula and some of the long-haired wailers of today". John F. Szwed of Jazz & Pop called the band's performance on the record "tedious despite their ventures into electric viola et al", acknowledging the strength of their "loud whine" but ultimately writing that "something is lost in the translation" in the absence of the visual accompaniments of Exploding Plastic Inevitable.

=== Reappraisal ===
Retrospective professional ratings
Review scores
Source	Rating
AllMusic	5/5 stars
Blender	5/5 stars
Chicago Tribune	4/4 stars
Encyclopedia of Popular Music	5/5 stars
Pitchfork	10/10 (Note: When rating the album a 10/10, Pitchfork also rated its 2012 super deluxe a 9.0/10.)
Q	5/5 stars
Rolling Stone	5/5 stars
The Rolling Stone Album Guide	5/5 stars
Spin Alternative Record Guide	10/10
The Village Voice	A

A decade after its release, The Velvet Underground & Nico began to attract wide praise from rock critics. Christgau wrote in his 1977 retrospective review for the Village Voice that the record had been difficult to understand in 1967, "which is probably why people are still learning from it. It sounds intermittently crude, thin, and pretentious at first, but it never stops getting better." He later included it in his "Basic Record Library" of 1950s and 1960s recordings, published in Christgau's Record Guide: Rock Albums of the Seventies (1981).

The Velvet Underground & Nico has been characterized as "the original art-rock record" and regarded as ahead of its time. In The Encyclopedia of Popular Music (1998), Colin Larkin called it a "powerful collection" that "introduced Reed's decidedly urban infatuations, a fascination for street culture and amorality bordering on voyeurism." In April 2003, Spin led their "Top Fifteen Most Influential Albums of All Time" list with the album. On November 12, 2000, NPR included it in their "NPR 100" series of "the most important American musical works of the 20th century". In 2003, Rolling Stone placed it at number 13 on their list of the 500 Greatest Albums Of All Time, maintaining the rating in a 2012 revised list, calling it the "most prophetic rock album ever made". It re-ranked at number 23 in a 2020 reboot of the list. The album was selected as one of the 24 significant US albums of the 1960s in the book "The Perfect Collection" by Tom Hibbert (1982).

In 1997, The Velvet Underground & Nico was named the 22nd greatest album of all time in a "Music of the Millennium" poll conducted in the United Kingdom by HMV, Channel 4, The Guardian and Classic FM. In 2006, Q magazine readers voted it into 42nd place in the "2006 Q Magazine Readers' 100 Greatest Albums Ever" poll, while The Observer placed it at number 1 in a list of "50 Albums That Changed Music" in July of that year. Also in 2006, the album was chosen by Time magazine as one of the 100 best albums of all time. In 2017, Pitchfork placed the album at the top of its list of "The 200 Best Albums of the 1960s". Staff writer Philip Sherburne wrote: "Today, it's easy to see The Velvet Underground & Nico as a solipsistic record, given all the social and political problems of the era that it ignores; the Velvets weren't so much turning on and dropping out as digging in and shooting up. If the contemporary underground begins here then so too, perhaps, does its occasionally blinkered perspective. Art for art's sake can be a hell of a drug. But for all of their danger and debasement, there was also something cozy about the Velvet Underground. [...] Far from 'closing in on death', the Velvet Underground were zeroing in on the sound of the future." It was voted number 13 in Colin Larkin's All Time Top 1000 Albums 3rd Edition (2000). In 2025, Apple named it one of the 100 best albums.

In 2006, The Velvet Underground & Nico was inducted into the National Recording Registry by the Library of Congress for being "culturally, historically, or aesthetically significant". In 2008, it was inducted into the Grammy Hall of Fame, honoring recordings of "lasting qualitative or historical significance".

=== Cover versions ===
In April 1967, one month after the album's release, a band called the Electrical Banana may have recorded the first cover version of "There She Goes Again". According to bandmember Dean Kohler, they recorded it in a tent in Vietnam in April 1967 and sent the master tape to a company in California to have 45 RPM records pressed.

Also in 1967 the Dutch band The Riats from The Hague released a single with "Run, Run, Run" as the A-side and "Sunday Morning" as B-side. The exact release date is unknown, so it remains open for debate whether Electric Banana or The Riats were the first to put a Velvet Underground cover on record.

In 1991, Melvins covered "Venus in Furs" on a split 7" single with Nirvana, who recorded "Here She Comes Now" from White Light/White Heat.

In 2009, the American musician Beck recorded a track-for-track cover of The Velvet Underground & Nico and released it online in video form on his website, as part of a project called Record Club. Musicians involved in the recording include Beck plus Nigel Godrich, Joey Waronker, Brian LeBarton, Bram Inscore, Yo, Giovanni Ribisi, Chris Holmes, and Þórunn Magnúsdóttir.

Also in 2009, various artists from Argentina collaborated to produce a track-for-track cover of the record. They played a number of concerts in Buenos Aires to celebrate the release of the album, which was made available online for free.

In 2012, Castle Face Records and Universal released a track-for-track cover of the album, also called The Velvet Underground & Nico. Each song was covered by a different artist, who were collectively billed as "Castle Face and Friends." Artists included Thee Oh Sees, Ty Segall, and Kelley Stoltz.

In 2021, Verve Records released the tribute album I'll Be Your Mirror: A Tribute to The Velvet Underground & Nico, a track-by-track cover of the album with performances by St. Vincent, Sharon Van Etten, Bobby Gillespie, and Iggy Pop among others.

== Aftermath ==
Frustrated by the album's year-long delay and unsuccessful release, Reed's relationship with Warhol grew tense. Reed fired Warhol as manager in favor of Steve Sesnick, who convinced the group to move in a more commercial direction. Nico was forced out of the group, and began a career as a solo artist. Her debut solo album, Chelsea Girl, was released in October 1967, featuring some songs written by Cale, Morrison, and Reed.

Tom Wilson continued working with the Velvet Underground, producing their 1968 album White Light/White Heat and Nico's Chelsea Girl.

== Track listing ==
All tracks are written by Lou Reed, except where noted. All lead vocals by Reed, except where noted.

Side one
No.	Title	Lead vocals	Length
1.	"Sunday Morning"		2:53
2.	"I'm Waiting for the Man"		4:37
3.	"Femme Fatale"	Nico	2:35
4.	"Venus in Furs"		5:07
5.	"Run Run Run"		4:18
6.	"All Tomorrow's Parties"	Nico	5:55
Total length:			25:25

Side two
No.	Title	Lead vocals	Length
1.	"Heroin"		7:05
2.	"There She Goes Again"		2:30
3.	"I'll Be Your Mirror"	Nico	2:16
4.	"The Black Angel's Death Song" (Reed, John Cale)		3:10
5.	"European Son" (Reed, Cale, Sterling Morrison, Maureen Tucker)		7:40
Total length:			22:41

== Personnel ==
According to the album's liner notes:

- Lou Reed – lead guitar, ostrich guitar, vocals
- John Cale – electric viola, bass guitar, piano, celeste on "Sunday Morning"
- Sterling Morrison – rhythm guitar, bass guitar, backing vocals
- Maureen Tucker – percussion
- Nico – chanteuse (Note: French word for singer.)

Production

- Andy Warhol – producer (all tracks except "Sunday Morning")
- Tom Wilson – producer on "Sunday Morning"
- Norman Dolph – engineer
- Omi Haden – engineer
- John Licata – engineer

== Reissues and deluxe editions ==
=== Compact disc ===
The first CD edition of the album was released in 1986 and featured slight changes. The title of the album was featured on the cover, unlike the original LP release. In addition, the album contained an alternative mix of "All Tomorrow's Parties" which featured a single track of lead vocals as opposed to the double-tracked vocal version on the original LP. Apparently, the decision to use the double-tracked version on the original LP was made at the last minute. Bill Levenson, who was overseeing the initial CD issues of the VU's Verve/MGM catalog, wanted to keep the single-voice version a secret as a surprise to fans, but was dismayed to find out that the alternative version was revealed as such on the CD's back cover (and noted as "previously unreleased").

The subsequent 1996 remastered CD reissue removed these changes, keeping the original album art and double-tracked mix of "All Tomorrow's Parties" found on the LP.

=== Peel Slowly and See box set ===
The Velvet Underground & Nico was released in its entirety on the five-year spanning box set Peel Slowly and See, in 1995. The album was featured on the second disc of the set along with the single version of "All Tomorrow's Parties", two Nico tracks from Chelsea Girl and a ten-minute excerpt of the 30-minute "Melody Laughter" performance. Also included in the set (on the first disc) are the band's 1965 Ludlow Street loft demos. Among these demos are early versions of "Venus in Furs", "Heroin", "I'm Waiting for the Man" and "All Tomorrow's Parties".

=== Deluxe edition ===
In 2002, Universal released a two-disc "Deluxe Edition" set containing the stereo version of the album along with the five tracks from Nico's Chelsea Girl written by members of the band on disc one, and the mono version of the album along with the mono single mixes of "All Tomorrow's Parties" and "Sunday Morning" and their B-sides "I'll Be Your Mirror" and "Femme Fatale" on disc two. A studio demo of the unreleased track "Miss Joanie Lee" had been planned for inclusion on the set, but a dispute over royalties between the band and Universal canceled these plans. This contractual dispute apparently also led to the cancellation of further installments of the band's official Bootleg Series. However, this track was included in the subsequent re-release, 45th Anniversary Super Deluxe Edition. In April 2010, Universal re-released the second disc of the "Deluxe Edition" as a single CD "Rarities Edition".

Disc 1 additional tracks
No.	Title	Writer(s)	Length
12.	"Little Sister"	John Cale, Lou Reed	4:27
13.	"Winter Song"	Cale	3:23
14.	"It Was a Pleasure Then"	Reed, Cale, Nico Päffgen	8:09
15.	"Chelsea Girls"	Reed, Sterling Morrison	7:29
16.	"Wrap Your Troubles in Dreams"	Reed	5:09
Total length:			28:37

Disc 2 additional tracks
No.	Title	Length
12.	"All Tomorrow's Parties" (Verve single VE 10427)	2:53
13.	"I'll Be Your Mirror" (Verve single VE 10427 B-side)	2:18
14.	"Sunday Morning" (Verve single VE 10466)	3:00
15.	"Femme Fatale" (Verve single VE 10466 B-side)	2:38
Total length:		10:49

=== 45th Anniversary Super Deluxe edition ===
On October 1, 2012, Universal released a 6-CD box set of the album. It features the previously available mono and stereo mixes as discs one and two respectively. Disc one contains as bonus tracks additional alternate versions of "All Tomorrow's Parties", "European Son", "Heroin", "All Tomorrow's Parties" (instrumental), and "I'll Be Your Mirror". Disc two contains the same bonus tracks as the prior deluxe version's second disc. Disc three is Nico's Chelsea Girl in its entirety and the Scepter Studios acetate (see below) in its entirety occupies disc 4. Discs 5 and 6 contain a previously unreleased live performance from 1966. According to the essay by music critic and historian Richie Unterberger contained within the set, the source for the show is the only audio tape of acceptable quality recording during singer Nico's tenure in the band. The essay also clarifies that the absence of any DVD materials in the box set is due to the fact that none of the band's shows were filmed, in spite of their heavy reliance on multimedia visuals.

Disc 5: Live at Valleydale Ballroom, Columbus, Ohio, November 4, 1966 (Part 1)
No.	Title	Length
1.	"Melody Laughter" (Instrumental jam)	28:26
2.	"Femme Fatale"	2:37
3.	"Venus in Furs"	4:45
4.	"The Black Angel's Death Song"	4:45
5.	"All Tomorrow's Parties"	5:03
Total length:		45:36

Disc 6: Live at Valleydale Ballroom, Columbus, Ohio, November 4, 1966 (Part 2)
No.	Title	Length
1.	"I'm Waiting for the Man"	4:50
2.	"Heroin"	6:42
3.	"Run Run Run"	8:43
4.	"The Nothing Song" (Instrumental jam)	27:56
Total length:		48:11

=== Scepter Studios acetate version ===
Norman Dolph's original acetate recording of the Scepter Studios material contains several recordings that would make it onto the final album, though many are different mixes of those recordings and three are different takes entirely. The acetate was cut on April 25, 1966, shortly after the recording sessions. It resurfaced decades later when it was bought by collector Warren Hill of Montreal, Quebec, Canada in September 2002 at a flea market in the Chelsea neighborhood of New York City for $0.75. Hill put the album up for auction on eBay in November. On December 8, 2006, a winning bid for $155,401 was placed, but not honored. The album was again placed for auction on eBay and was successfully sold on December 16, 2006, for $25,200.

Although ten songs were recorded during the Scepter sessions, only nine appear on the acetate cut. Dolph recalls "There She Goes Again" being the missing song (and, indeed, the version of "There She Goes Again" that appears on the final LP is attributed to the Scepter Studios session). In 2012, the acetate was officially released as disc 4 of the omnicomprehensive "45th Anniversary Super Deluxe Edition" box set of the album (see above). The disc also includes six previously unreleased bonus tracks, recorded during the band's rehearsals at The Factory on January 3, 1966. However, a ripped version of the acetate began circulating the internet in January 2007. Bootleg versions of the acetate tracks have also become available on vinyl and CD. The acetate was issued on vinyl in 2013 as a limited edition for Record Store Day. In 2014, it went back to auction.

Box set, disc 4 track listing

1. "European Son" (Alternate version) – 9:02
2. "The Black Angel's Death Song" (Alternate mix) – 3:16
3. "All Tomorrow's Parties" (Alternate version) – 5:53
4. "I'll Be Your Mirror" (Alternate mix) – 2:11
5. "Heroin" (Alternate version) – 6:16
6. "Femme Fatale" (Alternate mix) – 2:36
7. "Venus in Furs" (Alternate version) – 4:29
8. "I'm Waiting for the Man" (Alternate version, here titled "Waiting for the Man") – 4:10
9. "Run Run Run" (Alternate mix) – 4:23
10. "Walk Alone" – 3:27
11. "Crackin' Up/Venus in Furs" – 3:52
12. "Miss Joanie Lee" – 11:49
13. "Heroin" – 6:14
14. "There She Goes Again" (with Nico) – 2:09
15. "There She Goes Again" – 2:56

Notes

- Tracks 1–9 are the original Scepter Studios acetate. Tracks 1, 2, 3, and 5 are sourced from tape; tracks 4, 6, 7, 8, and 9 are from the actual acetate.
- Tracks 10–15 are the January 3, 1966, Factory rehearsals, also from tape, previously unreleased.

== Charts ==
Chart performance for The Velvet Underground & Nico
Chart (1967–2026)	Peak position
Belgian Albums (Ultratop Flanders)	114
Belgian Albums (Ultratop Wallonia)	174
Croatian International Albums (HDU)	20
Dutch Albums (Album Top 100)	58
German Albums (Offizielle Top 100)	89
Italian Albums (FIMI)	76
Norwegian Albums (VG-lista)	40
UK Albums (OCC)	43 (Note: The album did not reach the UK charts until 1994, when it reached number 59. Shortly after the death of Lou Reed in 2013, it peaked at 43.)
US Billboard 200	129

== Certifications ==
Certifications for The Velvet Underground & Nico
Region	Certification	Certified units/sales
Italy (FIMI)	Platinum	50,000^{*}
United Kingdom (BPI)	Platinum	300,000^{^}
^{*} Sales figures based on certification alone.^{^} Shipments figures based on certification alone.

According to Nielsen SoundScan, which tracks sales, The Velvet Underground & Nico sold 560,000 copies between 1991 and 2013.

== Bibliography ==
- Blush, Steven (2016). New York Rock: From the Rise of The Velvet Underground to the Fall of CBGB. New York City: St. Martin's Publishing Group. ISBN 978-1-250-08362-3.
- Bockris, Victor (1994). Transformer: The Lou Reed Story. New York: Simon and Schuster. ISBN 0-306-80752-1.
- Bockris, Victor & Malanga, Gerard (1996) [1983]. Up-tight: The Velvet Underground Story. Omnibus Press. ISBN 0-7119-5223-X.
- DeRogatis, Jim (2003). Turn on Your Mind: Four Decades of Great Psychedelic Rock. Hal Leonard Corporation. ISBN 1-61780-215-8. Archived from the original on October 9, 2013.
- Harvard, Joe (2004). The Velvet Underground and Nico. 33⅓. New York, NY: Continuum International Publishing Group. ISBN 978-0-8264-1550-9.
- Heylin, Clinton (2009). All Yesterdays' Parties: The Velvet Underground in Print, 1966–1971. Da Capo Press. ISBN 978-0-7867-3689-8. Archived from the original on June 24, 2016.
- Hogan, Peter (1997). The Complete Guide to the Music of the Velvet Underground. Omnibus Press. ISBN 978-0-7119-5596-7. Archived from the original on April 18, 2017.
- Irvin, Jim; McLear, Colin, eds. (2007). "The Velvet Underground". The MOJO Collection: The Ultimate Music Companion (4th ed.). Edinburgh: Canongate Books. ISBN 9781847676436. Archived from the original on February 22, 2017.
- Larkin, Colin (1998). Encyclopedia of Popular Music. Vol. 7 (3rd ed.). Muze UK. pp. 5626–7. ISBN 1-56159-237-4.
- Ross, Michael R. (2014). "The Velvet Underground". In Henderson, Lol; Stacey, Lee (eds.). Encyclopedia of Music in the 20th Century. London: Routledge. p. 649. ISBN 978-1-135-92946-6.
- Schinder, Scott (2007). "The Velvet Underground". In Schinder, Scott; Schwartz, Andy (eds.). Icons of Rock: An Encyclopedia of the Legends Who Changed Music Forever. Westport, Connecticut: Greenwood Press. ISBN 978-0-313-33845-8. Archived from the original on February 22, 2017.
- Sounes, Howard (2015). Notes from the Velvet Underground: The Life of Lou Reed. Random House. ISBN 978-1-473-50895-8. Archived from the original on June 10, 2021.
- Strodder, Chris (2007). The Encyclopedia of Sixties Cool: A Celebration of the Grooviest People, Events, and Artifacts of the 1960s. Santa Monica: Santa Monica Press. ISBN 978-1-59580-986-5 – via Google Books.
- Unterberger, Richie (2009). White Light/White Heat: The Velvet Underground Day-by-Day. London: Jawbone Press. ISBN 978-1-906002-22-0.
- Unterberger, Richie (2026). Do What You Fear Most: The History of the Velvet Underground. London: Omnibus Press. ISBN 978-1-913172-99-2.
- Wall, Mick (2013). Lou Reed: The Life. London: Orion. ISBN 978-1-4091-5308-5.
