= Lady Godiva's Operation =

Song by the Velvet Underground

from the album White Light/White Heat
- Released: January 30, 1968
- Recorded: September 1967
- Studio: Scepter Studios, New York City
- Genre: Art rock
- Length: 4:56
- Label: Verve
- Songwriter: Lou Reed
- Producer: Tom Wilson

"Lady Godiva's Operation" is a song by American rock band the Velvet Underground from their second album, White Light/White Heat (1968). The lyrics of the first half of the song, sung by John Cale, describe Lady Godiva; the lyrics of the second half, sung by Cale alternating with Lou Reed, are full of oblique, deadpan black humor and describe a botched surgical procedure, implied to be a lobotomy. Cale plays electric viola while Sterling Morrison plays bass, an instrument that he disliked, despite his competent abilities.

The song was covered by the Fatima Mansions as a single.

Lou Reed said of the song in 1973: "Listen to the lyrics of my early songs, 'Lady Godiva's Operation' was about a trans-sexual."

== Personnel ==
- John Cale – lead vocals, electric viola, medical instrument vocal noises
- Lou Reed – co-lead vocals, electric guitar
- Sterling Morrison – bass guitar, backing vocals, medical instrument vocal noises
- Maureen Tucker – percussion
