= The Black Angel's Death Song =

Song by the Velvet Underground

from the album The Velvet Underground & Nico
- Released: March 12, 1967
- Recorded: April 1966
- Studio: Scepter, New York City
- Genre: Experimental rock; psychedelic rock
- Length: 3:11
- Label: Verve
- Songwriters: Lou Reed, John Cale
- Producer: Andy Warhol

"The Black Angel's Death Song" is a song by the Velvet Underground, from their 1967 debut album The Velvet Underground & Nico. It was written by Lou Reed and John Cale. In a footnote to the lyrics, Lou Reed wrote: "The idea here was to string words together for the sheer fun of their sound, not any particular meaning."

The song was not popular with clubs, according to Reed in a Matrix rendition of the song ("As a matter of fact, when a club wanted to close for a while, they would get in touch with us and ask us to play this song.") In late 1965, Al Aronowitz arranged for the Velvets to play at the Café Bizarre in Greenwich Village for a fortnight in December 1965; while there, they played a "furious" version of "Black Angel's Death Song"; the manager ordered them not to play that song again, to which the band responded by playing it again "with a vengeance", and were sacked.

== Recording ==
The song was recorded in April 1966 at Scepter Studios in Manhattan. The music is dominated by the piercing sound of John Cale's electric viola, creating dissonance throughout the song. Also throughout the song are loud bursts of audio feedback, primarily from Cale hissing into the microphone. Reed and Morrison's guitars in the song are tuned down a whole step, as is common with a handful of other songs on The Velvet Underground & Nico.

According to Cale, Sterling Morrison refused to play bass guitar on the song because he disliked having to play it on "Venus in Furs"; Cale thus overdubbed a bassline while Morrison stuck to his usual guitar.
