= I Heard Her Call My Name =

Song by the Velvet Underground

from the album White Light/White Heat
- Released: January 30, 1968
- Recorded: September 1967
- Studio: Scepter Studios, New York City
- Genre: Garage rock; avant-pop; proto-punk; psychedelic rock
- Length: 4:38
- Label: Verve
- Songwriter: Lou Reed
- Producer: Tom Wilson

"I Heard Her Call My Name" is a song by American rock band the Velvet Underground. It is the fifth track from the band's second album, White Light/White Heat. It is a particularly loud, brash and aggressive song that features a pair of atonal guitar solos performed by Lou Reed and repeated use of high pitched feedback.

In an interview, guitarist Sterling Morrison said, "I quit the group for a couple of days because I thought they chose the wrong mix for 'I Heard Her Call My Name', one of our best songs that was completely ruined in the studio."

== Personnel ==
- Lou Reed – lead vocals, lead guitar
- Sterling Morrison – rhythm guitar, backing vocals
- John Cale – bass guitar, backing vocals
- Maureen Tucker – percussion
