= Run Run Run (The Velvet Underground song) =

Song by the Velvet Underground

from the album The Velvet Underground & Nico
- Released: March 12, 1967
- Recorded: April 1966
- Genre: Garage rock; psychedelic rock; R&B
- Length: 4:22
- Label: Verve
- Songwriter: Lou Reed
- Producer: Andy Warhol

"Run Run Run" is a song by the Velvet Underground originally released on the band's 1967 debut album, The Velvet Underground & Nico.

The song was written on the back of an envelope by Lou Reed while he and the band were on their way to a gig at the Café Bizarre. The song details a number of characters living in New York City, including Teenage Mary, Margarita Passion, Seasick Sarah, and Beardless Harry, all of whom are detailed using or seeking drugs. In addition to mentioning New York scenery such as Union Square and 47th Street, the song makes use of drug terms paired with religious imagery. Two of the four verses directly speak of heroin use, a theme found in the album. In the song, Marguerita Passion tried to sell her soul in order to get "a fix", while Seasick Sarah "turned blue", causing her angels to panic. The song is also well known because of Reed's guitar solo, and its lack of a conventional approach.

== Personnel ==
- Lou Reed – lead guitar, double-tracked (on chorus) lead vocals
- John Cale – bass
- Sterling Morrison – rhythm guitar, backing vocals
- Maureen Tucker – drums

== Cover versions ==
- Beck covered the entirety of The Velvet Underground and Nico including "Run Run Run" as part of his Record Club project.
- The Flowers of Hell released an instrumental version on their 2012 covers album Odes.
- A version of the song was specially recorded by Julian Casablancas for the HBO television series Vinyl. It appeared on the soundtrack of the second episode during a flashback to Andy Warhol's Factory, alongside "Venus in Furs".
