= Venus in Furs (song) =

Single by the Velvet Underground

from the album The Velvet Underground & Nico
- Released: March 12, 1967
- Recorded: May 1966
- Studio: TTG, Hollywood, California
- Genre: Drone rock; art rock
- Length: 5:12
- Label: Verve
- Songwriter: Lou Reed
- Producer: Andy Warhol

Official audio
- "Venus In Furs" on YouTube

Audio sample
- "Venus in Furs": file; help

"Venus in Furs" is a song by the Velvet Underground, written by Lou Reed and originally released on the band's 1967 debut album The Velvet Underground & Nico. Inspired by the novel of the same name by Leopold von Sacher-Masoch, the song includes sexual themes of sadomasochism and bondage.

"Venus in Furs" was also released as a single on several occasions; in 1988 in the UK and as a live single in France and the UK, in 1993 and 1994 respectively. This live version appears on the 1993 live album Live MCMXCIII.

== Recording ==
"Venus in Furs" was one of three songs to be re-recorded, in May 1966 at TTG Studios in Hollywood, before appearing on the final mix of The Velvet Underground & Nico (the other two being "Heroin" and "I'm Waiting for the Man"). The arrangement features John Cale's electric viola and Lou Reed's electric guitar, detuned to D G C F A C. Guitarist Sterling Morrison played bass guitar on the song, but according to Cale, who was the band's usual bassist, Morrison never cared for playing the instrument. The backbeat consists of two bass drum beats and one tambourine hit, played at a slow pace by Maureen Tucker.

== Meaning ==
In his essay "Venus in Furs by the Velvet Underground", Erich Kuersten writes:

There is no intro or buildup to the song; the track starts as if you opened a door to a decadent Marrakesh S&M/opium den, a blast of air-conditioned Middle Eastern menace with a plodding beat that's the missing link between "Bolero" and Led Zeppelin's version of "When the Levee Breaks".

Morrison cited "Venus in Furs" as his favorite Velvet Underground song, as he believed it was where the band achieved the sound that they had sought.

== Personnel ==
- Lou Reed – lead guitar, ostrich guitar, vocals
- John Cale – electric viola
- Sterling Morrison – bass guitar
- Maureen Tucker – percussion

== Charts ==
Chart (1994)	Peak position
UK Singles (Official Charts)	71

== Alternate versions ==
=== Ludlow Street Loft, July 1965 ===
"Venus in Furs" was one of several songs to be recorded by Lou Reed, John Cale and Sterling Morrison at their Ludlow Street loft in July 1965. This demo version of the song features Cale on lead vocals and a drastically different arrangement than would appear on The Velvet Underground & Nico, ending with what David Fricke calls a "stark, Olde English-style folk lament" in the liner notes for Peel Slowly and See.

=== Scepter Studios, April 1966 ===
An alternate take of the song was first recorded at Scepter Studios, New York City before being re-recorded in Hollywood. This take of the song is performed at a faster tempo, and the lyrics vary slightly from the TTG recording.

=== Live recordings ===
Live recordings of "Venus in Furs" appear on Bootleg Series Volume 1: The Quine Tapes (recorded in San Francisco, December 1969) and on Live MCMXCIII (recorded in Paris, June 1993).

=== Norman Dolph acetate and Factory rehearsal ===
In 2012 a six-CD boxed set was issued, celebrating the album's 45th anniversary. It includes the original version of the album, known as the "Norman Dolph acetate" dating from April 26 1966, and a version recorded on January 3, 1966 during rehearsals at Warhol's Factory.

== Legacy ==
"Venus in Furs" is widely considered one of the band's greatest songs. In 2012, Paste ranked the song number nine on their list of the 20 greatest Velvet Underground songs, and in 2021, The Guardian placed the song at number three on their list of the 30 greatest Velvet Underground songs.

== In film and TV ==
- In 1965, the Velvet Underground appeared in Piero Heliczer's underground film, Venus in Furs, which was named for the song. Heliczer, the Velvets, and the other performers were featured in a CBS News segment titled "The Making of an Underground Film" which aired in December of that year. This brief appearance turned out to be the only network television exposure for either Heliczer or the band.
- The song is featured in Gus Van Sant's 2005 film Last Days, a fictionalized account of the last days of a musician, loosely based on Kurt Cobain.
- A version of the song was specially recorded by Julian Casablancas for the HBO television series Vinyl. It appeared on the soundtrack of the second episode during a flashback to Andy Warhol's Factory, alongside "Run Run Run".

=== In advertising ===
In 1993, the song was used as the soundtrack for a British advertisement for Dunlop Tyres, by the advertising agency Abbott Mead Vickers BBDO and directed by British director Tony Kaye. The advertisement was notable for featuring both fetish and surrealist imagery.
