= Sunday Morning (The Velvet Underground song) =

Single by the Velvet Underground

from the album The Velvet Underground & Nico
- B-side: "Femme Fatale"
- Released: December 1966
- Recorded: November 1966
- Studio: Mayfair Recording, New York City
- Genre: Pop • Psychedelia • Dream Pop
- Length: 2:53
- Label: Verve
- Songwriter: Lou Reed
- Producer: Tom Wilson

The Velvet Underground singles chronology
"All Tomorrow's Parties" (1966)	"Sunday Morning" (1966)	"White Light/White Heat" (1968)

Audio sample
- file; help

"Sunday Morning" is a song by the Velvet Underground. It is the opening track on their 1967 debut album The Velvet Underground & Nico. It was first released as a single in December 1966. The song is written in the key of F major.

== Recording ==
["Sunday Morning" is] about how you feel when you've been up all Saturday night and you're crawling home while people are going to church. The sun is up and you're like Dracula, hiding your eyes.

— Sterling Morrison

In late 1966, "Sunday Morning" was the final song to be recorded for The Velvet Underground & Nico. It was requested by Tom Wilson, who thought the album needed another song with lead vocals by Nico with the potential to be a successful single. The final master tape of side one of the album shows "Sunday Morning" only penciled in before "I'm Waiting for the Man".

In November 1966, Wilson brought the band into Mayfair Recording Studios in Manhattan. The song was written with Nico's voice in mind by Lou Reed and John Cale on a Sunday morning. The band previously performed it live with Nico singing lead, but when it came time to record it, Lou Reed sang the lead vocal. Nico would instead sing backing vocals on the song.

Aiming to create a hit for the album, "Sunday Morning" features noticeably more lush and professional production than the rest of the songs on the album. The song's prominent use of celesta was the idea of John Cale, who noticed the instrument in the studio and decided to use it for the song. He also played viola and piano via overdubs; Sterling Morrison, normally the band's secondary guitarist, played bass guitar, despite his dislike of playing the instrument.

According to Reed, the song's theme was suggested by Andy Warhol. "Andy said, 'Why don't you just make it a song about paranoia?' I thought that was great so I came up with 'Watch out, the world's behind you, there's always someone around you who will call... It's nothing at all' which I feel is the ultimate paranoid statement in that the world cares enough to watch you."

== Reception ==
AllMusic's Mark Deming described the song as "dreamy pop", while Cash Box called the single a "haunting, lyrical emotion stirring chant."

== Certifications ==
Region	Certification	Certified units/sales
United Kingdom (BPI)	Silver	200,000^{‡}
^{‡} Sales+streaming figures based on certification alone.

== Personnel ==
- Lou Reed - lead vocals, guitars
- John Cale - electric viola, piano, celesta
- Sterling Morrison - bass guitar
- Moe Tucker - percussion
- Nico - backing vocals

== Cover versions ==
"Sunday Morning" has been covered by many artists, including Thea Gilmore for her favorites album These Quiet Friends (2025). Yugoslav punk rock band Psihomodo Pop recorded a Serbo-Croatian version for their 1988 debut album Godina zmaja. English electronic band Orchestral Manoeuvres in the Dark (OMD) also covered the song on their 1993 album, Liberator.
