= Sterling Morrison =

American musician (1942–1995)

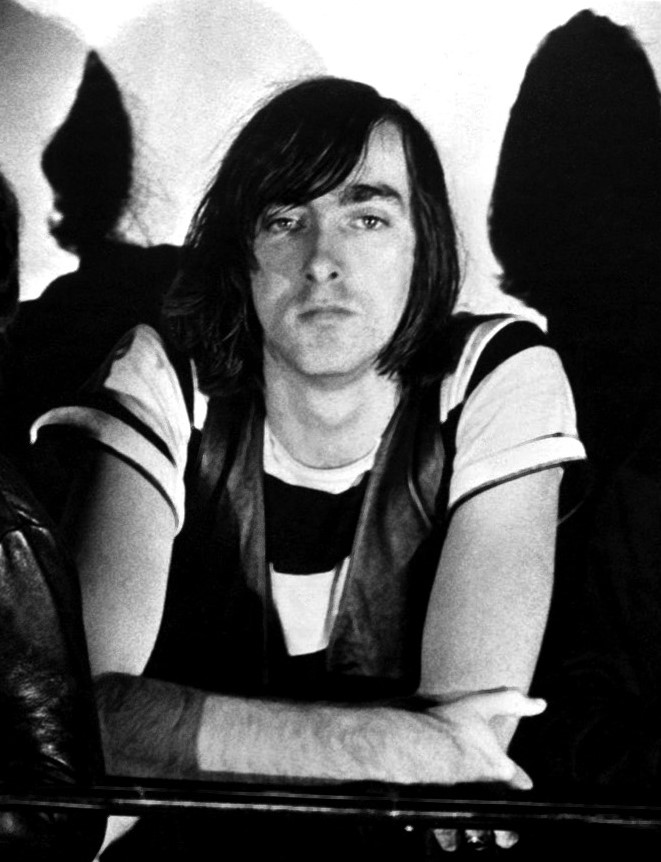
- Morrison in 1966

Background information
- Born: Holmes Sterling Morrison Jr. August 29, 1942; East Meadow, New York, U.S.
- Died: August 30, 1995 (aged 53) Poughkeepsie, New York, U.S.
- Genres: Rock; experimental rock; proto-punk; art rock
- Occupation: Musician
- Instruments: Guitar; bass
- Years active: 1965–1995
- Formerly of: The Velvet Underground

Holmes Sterling Morrison Jr. (August 29, 1942 – August 30, 1995) was an American musician, best known as one of the founding members of the rock band the Velvet Underground. He usually played electric guitar, occasionally played bass guitar, and provided backing vocals.

Unlike his Velvet Underground bandmates Lou Reed, Doug Yule, John Cale, Maureen Tucker, and Nico, Morrison never released a solo album or made recordings under his own name. He was nevertheless an essential element of the group's sound, his percussive and syncopated rhythm playing and melodic lead parts providing a foil for Reed's guitar and vocals.

== Biography ==
=== Early years ===
Holmes Sterling Morrison Jr. was born on August 29, 1942, in East Meadow, New York, on Long Island. He had two brothers and two sisters. His parents divorced when he was young and his mother remarried. He met future Velvet Underground drummer Moe Tucker through her brother Jim, with whom he attended Division Avenue High School in Levittown, New York. Originally playing trumpet, Morrison switched to guitar after his teacher was drafted.

Morrison majored in English at the City College of New York in Manhattan. While visiting Jim Tucker at Syracuse University in Syracuse, New York, he met Lou Reed, a friend of Tucker and a fellow English student. They met again in New York City in 1963. By this time, Reed had met musician John Cale and was interested in starting a band with him; the two invited Morrison to join.

=== The Velvet Underground (1965–1971) ===
Reed, Cale, Morrison, and Angus MacLise constituted the original line-up of the Velvet Underground, taking the name from Michael Leigh's book of the same name. Reed sang and played guitar; Morrison played guitar and bass guitar; Cale played viola, bass guitar, and keyboards; and MacLise played percussion. MacLise soon left and was replaced by Moe Tucker.

Morrison primarily played guitar on the band's first two albums, although he often filled in on bass when Cale played viola or keyboards. Some songs had both Reed and Morrison on guitar while Cale played viola or keyboards, with no bass guitar. Although Morrison was a proficient bassist, he disliked playing the instrument.

After Cale left the group in 1968, Morrison almost exclusively played guitar, though he continued to play bass onstage for certain songs when Doug Yule, Cale's replacement, played keyboards. Additionally, Morrison frequently sang backing vocals, and he recited many verses of Reed's poetry in "The Murder Mystery" and sang one line in "I'm Sticking with You".

Morrison repeatedly remarked that "Venus in Furs", from the band's debut album The Velvet Underground & Nico, was his personal favorite of their songs, as he felt that the group had achieved with that one track the sound they had in mind.

In 1970, when the band was back in New York City to play an entire summer's engagement at Max's Kansas City in Manhattan, Morrison seized the opportunity to complete his undergraduate degree. He remained in the Velvet Underground after Reed left in acrimonious circumstances in August 1970. In 1971, he began graduate studies at the University of Texas at Austin and started preparing to leave the band. Morrison's last performance with the group was on August 21, 1971, at Liberty Hall in Houston. When it was time for the band to return to New York, Morrison packed an empty suitcase and accompanied them to the gate of their departing plane, before finally telling them he was staying in Texas and leaving the band, making him the last founding member to quit. He would earn a Doctor of Philosophy in medieval literature from the university with a dissertation on the Old English poet Cynewulf in 1986.

=== Post-Velvet Underground life (1971–1990) ===
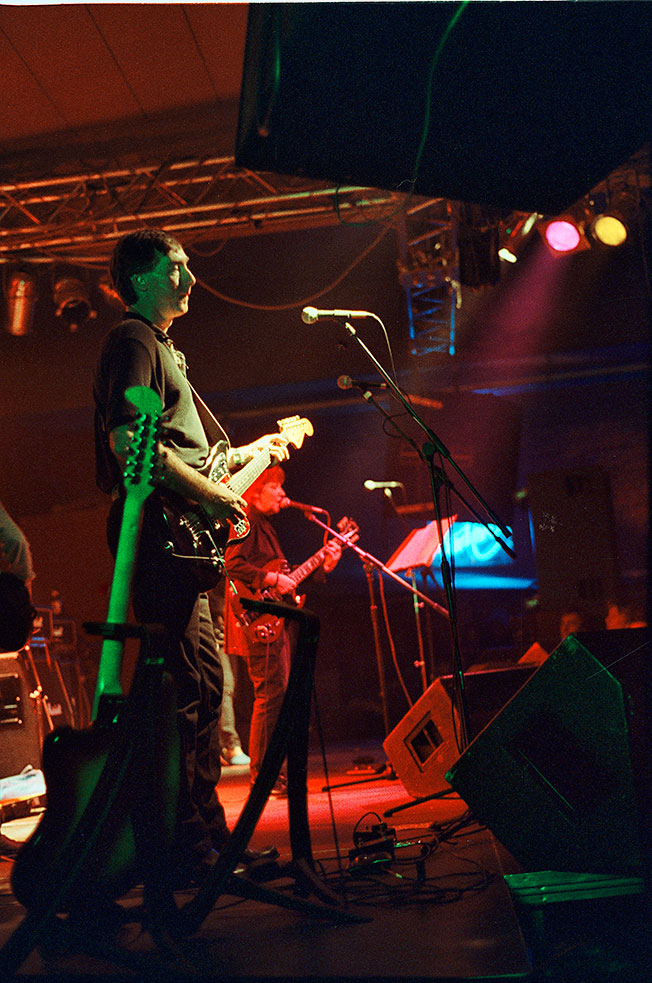
Sterling Morrison performing with Moe Tucker in Augsburg, Germany, in 1992

Morrison began to work on Houston tugboats as a deckhand to supplement his income in the mid-1970s; when he was forced to relinquish his graduate assistantship at UT Austin some years later, he was licensed as a master mariner and became the captain of a Houston tugboat, a vocation he pursued throughout the 1980s.

After leaving the Velvet Underground, Morrison's musical career was primarily limited to informal sessions for personal enjoyment, although he played in a few bands around Austin, most notably the Bizarros. During Cale's solo renaissance in the late 1970s, Morrison occasionally sat in with his former bandmate on stages such as the Armadillo World Headquarters in Austin. From the mid-1980s on, he occasionally recorded or performed with Cale, Reed, and particularly Tucker, who had by then started a solo career of her own. Morrison was part of her touring band for most of the late 1980s and early 1990s.

=== Velvet Underground reunion ===
In 1992, the core Velvet Underground lineup of Reed, Cale, Morrison and Tucker decided to reform for a tour and possible album. Morrison argued for Yule to join as well, but Reed and Cale vetoed him. The band toured Europe in 1993, alternatively as headline act or supporting U2, producing the live album and concert video Live MCMXCIII. By the end of the tour, relationships between Cale and Reed had soured again and plans for a US tour and MTV Unplugged album were scrapped. Morrison then returned to Tucker's band for a tour in 1994.

=== Health and death ===
In late 1994, Morrison was diagnosed with non-Hodgkin's lymphoma, and his health deteriorated to where he could no longer play guitar. He was visited by his former bandmates Reed and Tucker. Reed stated that when he visited Morrison for the last time, he was bedridden and had lost weight and his hair, but never complained about his illness, which he described as "leaves in the fall".

Morrison died on August 30, 1995, in Poughkeepsie, New York, one day after his 53rd birthday. He is buried at Poughkeepsie Rural Cemetery.

=== Legacy ===
Upon the Velvet Underground's induction into the Rock and Roll Hall of Fame in 1996, Reed, Cale, and Tucker performed a new song entitled "Last Night I Said Goodbye to My Friend", which was dedicated to Morrison; this would be the band's final performance. Yule wrote an obituary for Morrison.

In March 2001, Morrison was remembered through a tribute set at the Austin Music Awards during the city's South by Southwest festival. Cale performed "Some Friends", a song he had composed in Morrison's memory, with Morrison's Austin friend Alejandro Escovedo, who played a song he wrote in 1995 called "Tugboat" which alludes to Morrison's time as a tugboat captain in Houston. An SXSW panel on Morrison convened that year, with Cale and others remembering him. Morrison was also the subject of a series of oral history articles, Velvet Underdog, in The Austin Chronicle that year.

Other songs that honor Morrison include "Tugboat" by Galaxie 500. Morrison was a major influence on Dean Wareham.

=== Personal life ===
Morrison's surviving family includes his widow, Martha (whom he married in 1971), his son, Thomas, and his daughter, Mary Anne, all of whom reside in Poughkeepsie.

== Guitar style ==
When John Cale was in the Velvet Underground, Morrison primarily focused on rhythm guitar, although Reed and Morrison traded lead and rhythm roles. After Doug Yule replaced Cale, Morrison almost always took the role of lead guitarist, as Reed concentrated more on his singing and rhythm playing and Yule played bass guitar and keyboards.

Morrison and Reed's styles complemented each other, alternating between lead lines and rhythm parts interchangeably and with no assigned roles. Relative to Reed's improvisational and experimental guitar style, Morrison's guitar style was generally syncopated and more percussive with cleaner melodic lead parts. Praising his bandmate's guitar playing, Reed told David Fricke: "Sometimes, I think his guitar playing is very much like his first name – sterling. It's involved. And yet it has a grace and elegance to it, even in the fast-note runs. You could play me a hundred guitars, and I could spot Sterling."

Yule stated that Morrison's greatest influence as a guitarist was Mickey Baker of Mickey & Sylvia.

== Songwriting credits ==
While Reed was the Velvet Underground's main songwriter, there has been some conjecture that both Morrison and Cale made more songwriting contributions than was specified in their album credits. Morrison later told Victor Bockris: "Lou really did want to have a whole lot of credit for the songs, so on nearly all of the albums we gave it to him. It kept him happy. He got the rights to all the songs on Loaded so now he's credited for being the absolute and singular genius of the Underground...I'm the last person to deny Lou's immense contribution and he's the best songwriter of the three of us. But he wanted all the credit, he wanted it more than we did, and he got it, to keep the peace." Nevertheless, Morrison got co-writing credits on "European Son", "Here She Comes Now", "The Gift", "Sister Ray", "Hey Mr. Rain", "Ride into the Sun", "Foggy Notion", "Ferryboat Bill", "I'm Gonna Move Right In", "Coney Island Steeplechase" and "Guess I'm Falling in Love". He also co-wrote Nico's "Chelsea Girls" with Reed.

== Discography with the Velvet Underground ==
Only recordings with Morrison are listed. For the band's full discography, please see the Velvet Underground article.

=== Singles ===
- "All Tomorrow's Parties" / "I'll Be Your Mirror" (1966)
- "Sunday Morning" / "Femme Fatale" (1966)
- "White Light/White Heat" / "Here She Comes Now" (1968)
- "What Goes On" / "Jesus" (promo, 1969)
- "Who Loves the Sun" / "Oh! Sweet Nuthin'" (1971)
- "Foggy Notion" / "I Can't Stand It" (promo, 1985)
- "Venus in Furs" / "I'm Waiting for the Man" (live, 1994)

=== Original albums ===
- The Velvet Underground & Nico (1967)
- White Light/White Heat (1968)
- The Velvet Underground (1969)
- Loaded (1970)
- Live at Max's Kansas City (1972)
- Live MCMXCIII (1993)

=== Later releases of archive material ===
- 1969: The Velvet Underground Live (1974)
- VU (1985)
- Another View (1986)
- Chronicles (1991)
- Peel Slowly and See (box set, 1995)
- Bootleg Series Volume 1: The Quine Tapes (live, 2001)
- The Very Best of the Velvet Underground (2003)
- The Complete Matrix Tapes (live, 2015)

== Additional recording history ==
- Nico – Chelsea Girl (1967)
  - Plays guitar on "Chelsea Girls" (which includes a rare Morrison writing credit) and "Wrap Your Troubles in Dreams"
- Moe Tucker – I Spent a Week There the Other Night (1992)
  - Plays electric guitar on "Too Shy"; plays 12-string guitar on "Blue, All the Way to Canada"
- Luna – Bewitched (1994)
  - Plays guitar on "Friendly Advice" and "Great Jones Street"
- Moe Tucker – Dogs Under Stress (1994)
  - Plays guitar on "Me, Myself and I", "I Don't Understand", "Little Girl" and "I Wanna"; plays electric sitar on "Danny Boy"
- John Cale – Antártida (1995)
  - Plays guitar on "People Who Died"
- Inside the Dream Syndicate Vol.III: Stainless Steel Gamelan (Table of the Elements 2002)
  - Personnel: Terry Jennings, Angus MacLise, John Cale, Sterling Morrison
