= Final V.U. 1971–1973 =

Live album box set by the Velvet Underground
- Released: August 2001
- Recorded: 1971–1973 in Massachusetts, United States; England and Wales, United Kingdom; and the Netherlands
- Genre: Rock
- Length: 264:00
- Label: Captain Trip
- Producer: The Velvet Underground

The Velvet Underground chronology
Peel Slowly and See (1995)	Final V.U. 1971–1973 (2001)	Bootleg Series Volume 1: The Quine Tapes (2001)

Professional ratings
Review scores
Source	Rating
AllMusic	3/5 stars
The Encyclopedia of Popular Music	2/5 stars

Final V.U. 1971–1973 is a box set by the Velvet Underground, comprising live recordings from after founding members Lou Reed and Sterling Morrison had left the group. It was released by Japanese record company Captain Trip Records in August 2001.

== Background ==
After singer, guitarist and main songwriter Lou Reed quit the Velvet Underground in August 1970, the band carried on: Doug Yule assumed leadership and moved to lead vocals and guitar, and Walter Powers joined to play bass guitar. This version of the Velvet Underground, which still featured original member Sterling Morrison and longtime drummer Maureen Tucker, played around 30 dates to promote the band's fourth album, Loaded (1970).

Almost a year after Reed's departure, Morrison also left the band; he was replaced by Boston-based keyboardist Willie Alexander. The band now contained no founding members (although Tucker had been a member since before the recording of the Velvets' debut album). They then went to tour the United Kingdom and the Netherlands, still in support of Loaded, which had had a March 1971 release date in Europe. Two dates of this tour, November 5, 1971 in London and November 19 in Amsterdam, were recorded by members of the audience, and appear as discs one and two of this set, respectively. The Amsterdam concert was also recorded from the soundboard by Dutch radio station VPRO and subsequently broadcast on FM radio. A few tracks from this broadcast were recorded by a fan and appear as tracks 11–14 on disc four of this set.

Once the European tour was completed, initial plans were for the Yule–Alexander–Powers–Tucker line-up to record a new studio album in England. However, band manager Steve Sesnick sent Alexander, Powers and Tucker back to America, and Yule recorded Squeeze backed by session musicians.

Sesnick then assembled a backing band around Yule to once again tour the United Kingdom in support of Squeeze. Shortly before the tour started, however, Sesnick quit as the Velvets' manager. Yule and the band struggled through the dates, then called it quits. One date of this tour, December 6, 1972, at St David's College, Lampeter, was recorded by an audience member and appears as disc three of this set.

In the spring of 1973 at the urging of a tour manager, Yule and some friends toured New England with a new group, which included some Velvet Underground material in their set lists. The tour manager insisted on billing the band as being the Velvet Underground despite demands from Yule not to do so. Yule fired the manager after three dates and the tour dissolved shortly thereafter. One date from this tour, May 27, 1973 in Boston, was recorded by an audience member and appears as disc four of this set.

The version of "Sweet Jane" on disc 4 contains the original deleted verse, while Lou Reed Live does not.

== Track listing ==
All songs written by Lou Reed except as noted.

Disc one – November 5, 1971

1. "Chapel of Love" (Jeff Barry, Ellie Greenwich, Phil Spector) - 1:35
2. "I'm Waiting for the Man" - 5:53
3. "Spare Change" (Alexander) - 3:50
4. "Some Kinda Love"/"Turn On Your Love Light" (Reed/Deadric Malone, Joseph Scott) - 12:46
5. "White Light/White Heat" - 5:49
6. "Pretty Tree Climber" (Alexander) - 5:32
7. "Rock and Roll" - 4:42
8. "Back on the Farm" (Alexander) - 6:48
9. "Dopey Joe" (Yule) - 3:02
10. "Sister Ray"/"Never Going Back to Georgia" (Reed, Cale, Morrison, Tucker/Alexander) - 13:15
11. "After Hours" - 3:27

Disc two – November 19, 1971

1. "I'm Waiting for the Man" - 4:54
2. "Spare Change" (Alexander) - 3:32
3. "Some Kinda Love" - 6:51
4. "White Light/White Heat" - 4:33
5. "Hold On" (unknown) - 4:58
6. "What Goes On" - 4:02
7. "Cool It Down" - 4:07
8. "Back on the Farm" (Alexander) - 7:04
9. "Oh! Sweet Nuthin'" - 8:21
10. "Sister Ray"/"Never Going Back to Georgia" (Reed, Cale, Morrison, Tucker/Alexander) - 14:45
11. "After Hours" - 3:20
12. "Dopey Joe" (Yule) - 3:23
13. "Rock and Roll" - 4:43

Disc three – December 6, 1972

1. "I'm Waiting for the Man" - 5:41
2. "White Light/White Heat" - 2:11
3. "Some Kinda Love" - 5:51
4. "Little Jack" (Yule) - 3:33
5. "Sweet Jane" - 3:41
6. "Mean Old Man" (Yule) - 2:59
7. "Run Run Run" - 6:16
8. "Caroline" (Yule) - 2:32
9. "Dopey Joe" (Yule) - 3:10
10. "What Goes On" - 4:14
11. "Sister Ray"/"Train Round the Bend" (Reed, Cale, Morrison, Tucker/Reed) - 14:01
12. "Rock and Roll" - 4:39
13. "I'm Waiting for the Man" - 5:43

Disc four – May 27, 1973, Boston, MA

1. "I'm Waiting for the Man" - 4:37
2. "Little Jack" (Yule) - 3:30
3. "White Light/White Heat" - 4:50
4. "Caroline" (Yule) - 2:55
5. "Sweet Jane" - 4:21
6. "Mean Old Man" (Yule) - 2:53
7. "Who's That Man" (Yule) - 4:07
8. "Let It Shine" (Krzyzewski) - 4:33
9. "Mama's Little Girl" (Yule) - 3:40
10. "Train Round the Bend" - 2:15
11. "White Light/White Heat" - 4:21
12. "What Goes On" - 4:06
13. "Cool It Down" - 4:12
14. "Oh! Sweet Nuthin'" - 7:54

== Personnel ==
The Velvet Underground

- Willie Alexander – keyboards, vocals (disc 1, disc 2, disc 4: 11–14)
- Walter Powers – bass guitar, backing vocals (disc 1, disc 2, disc 4: 11–14)
- Maureen Tucker – drums (disc 1, disc 2, disc 4: 11–14)
- Doug Yule – vocals, guitar

Additional musicians

- George Kay (Krzyzewski) – bass guitar (disc 3, disc 4: 1–10)
- Mark Nauseef – drums (disc 3)
- Rob Norris – guitar (disc 3)
- Don Silverman (has been known as Noor Khan since going to Afghanistan in 1975) – guitar (disc 4: 1–10)
- Billy Yule – drums (disc 4: 1–10)
