= Live at Max's Kansas City =

Live album by the Velvet Underground
- Released: May 30, 1972
- Recorded: August 23, 1970
- Venue: Max's Kansas City, New York City, United States
- Genre: Rock
- Length: 38:21
- Label: Cotillion
- Producer: Geoff Haslam

The Velvet Underground chronology
Loaded (1970)	Live at Max's Kansas City (1972)	Squeeze (1973)

Professional ratings
Review scores
Source	Rating
Allmusic	3/5 stars
Blender	3/5 stars
Christgau's Record Guide	B−
The Encyclopedia of Popular Music	1/5 stars
Rolling Stone 1972	(not rated)
Rolling Stone 2004	3/5 stars

Live at Max's Kansas City is a live album by the Velvet Underground recorded at the famous nightclub and restaurant at 213 Park Avenue South in New York City. It was originally released on May 30, 1972, by Cotillion, a subsidiary label of Atlantic Records.

== Background ==
The Velvet Underground signed a two-album deal with Atlantic in early 1970 and released their fourth studio album, Loaded, in November 1970. By the time of its release, singer/guitarist/main songwriter Lou Reed had left the band. The rest of the group continued on together, with Doug Yule switching from bass to guitar and taking over as full-time lead vocalist. Walter Powers was brought in to play bass. This line-up did a tour of the United States and Canada promoting Loaded, and also played additional, unreleased material that had been planned for inclusion on another new studio album. Atlantic, however, having lost faith in the band's commercial prospects decided to cut their losses after the disappointing chart showings of Loaded, and opted to release an archival live recording instead.

The tapes that would later become Live at Max's Kansas City were recorded on August 23, 1970, by Andy Warhol associate Brigid Polk on a portable cassette recorder. During the recording of Loaded, the Velvet Underground also held a nine-week engagement (June 24 – August 28, 1970) playing two sets per night at New York City nightclub Max's Kansas City. Polk had been in the habit of recording almost everything happening around her at the time, and this resulted in her capturing what turned out to be the band's last live performance with Reed. Later that year, Atlantic A&R employee Danny Fields heard the tapes and submitted them to his superiors, who accepted the recordings and in 1972 decided to make an album out of them, despite their relatively poor fidelity. Polk had made the recordings on a mono recorder using a simple ferro musicassette, resulting in tape hiss and audience noise often audible during the music's quieter parts. Author and musician Jim Carroll can be heard speaking on the album, ordering drinks and inquiring about drugs between songs, as he was the one holding the recording microphone.

The line-up for these recordings consisted of Reed, Yule, lead guitarist Sterling Morrison and drummer Billy Yule, the younger brother of Doug Yule; regular drummer Maureen Tucker temporarily left the group several months earlier when she became pregnant with her first child, Kerry "Trucker" Tucker.

Originally, Live at Max's Kansas City was a single album, with each side respectively devoted to the band's louder and quieter material. The songs were selected and edited from both sets by Lou Reed and Atlantic staff producer Geoff Haslam. On August 3, 2004, Warner Music re-issue label Rhino Records released a two-CD Deluxe Edition including both full sets in their original running order.

== Track listing ==
All tracks written by Lou Reed except as indicated.

Side one
No.	Title	Length
1.	"I'm Waiting for the Man"	4:00
2.	"Sweet Jane"	4:52
3.	"Lonesome Cowboy Bill"	3:41
4.	"Beginning to See the Light"	5:00

Side two
No.	Title	Writer(s)	Length
5.	"I'll Be Your Mirror"		1:55
6.	"Pale Blue Eyes"		5:38
7.	"Sunday Morning"	Reed, John Cale	2:43
8.	"New Age"		5:58
9.	"Femme Fatale"		2:29
10.	"After Hours"		2:05

=== 2004 reissue edition ===
All tracks written by Lou Reed except as indicated.

Disc one
No.	Title	Length
1.	"I'm Waiting for the Man"	5:50
2.	"White Light/White Heat"	6:07
3.	"I'm Set Free"	5:33
4.	"Sweet Jane" (Version 1)	6:18
5.	"Lonesome Cowboy Bill" (Version 1)	4:41
6.	"New Age"	6:44
7.	"Beginning to See the Light"	5:40

Disc two
No.	Title	Length
8.	"Who Loves the Sun"	2:17
9.	"Sweet Jane" (Version 2)	5:58
10.	"I'll Be Your Mirror"	3:02
11.	"Pale Blue Eyes"	7:10
12.	"Candy Says"	5:48
13.	"Sunday Morning" (Reed, Cale)	3:48
14.	"After Hours"	2:50
15.	"Femme Fatale"	4:07
16.	"Some Kinda Love"	11:22
17.	"Lonesome Cowboy Bill" (Version 2)	5:00
18.	"Atlantic release promo" (hidden track)	0:49

=== 2016 reissue edition ===
All tracks written by Lou Reed except as indicated.

No.	Title	Length
1.	"I'm Waiting for the Man"	5:44
2.	"White Light/White Heat"	5:15
3.	"I'm Set Free"	6:27
4.	"Sweet Jane"	6:17
5.	"Lonesome Cowboy Bill" (Version 1)	4:20
6.	"New Age"	6:38
7.	"Beginning to See the Light"	5:42
8.	"I'll Be Your Mirror"	3:27
9.	"Pale Blue Eyes"	6:01
10.	"Candy Says"	5:50
11.	"Sunday Morning" (Reed, Cale)	3:39
12.	"After Hours"	2:58
13.	"Femme Fatale"	3:09
14.	"Some Kinda Love"	11:03
15.	"Lonesome Cowboy Bill" (Version 2)	4:17

== Personnel ==
The Velvet Underground

- Sterling Morrison – lead guitar, vocals
- Lou Reed – vocals, rhythm guitar
- Doug Yule – vocals, bass guitar
- Billy Yule – drums, cowbell
