= Now We Are Married =

1991 rock single by Goodbye Mr Mackenzie

Single by Goodbye Mr Mackenzie

from the album Hammer and Tongs
- Released: 11 February 1991
- Recorded: Hansa Studios, Berlin, West Germany
- Genre: Alternative rock, new wave
- Label: Radioactive Records//MCA
- Songwriter(s): Martin Metcalfe
- Producer(s): Terry Adams

Goodbye Mr Mackenzie singles chronology
"Blacker Than Black" (1990)	"Now We Are Married" (1991)	"Goodbye Mr. Mackenzie EP" (1991)

"Now We Are Married" is a 1991 single by Scottish alternative rock group Goodbye Mr Mackenzie. It was their first single release for Gary Kurfirst's Radioactive Records label after their record deal was bought from Parlophone, and followed the previous year's singles "Love Child" and "Blacker Than Black". The "Now We Are Married" single immediately preceded the release of the band's second studio album Hammer and Tongs.

== Background ==
"[An] attempt at perfect pop" is how "Now We Are Married" is described by the band on their bio. "It’s not a song about getting married. Everyone thinks it’s something to walk down the aisle to. But really it was about my opposition to marriage," explained Martin Metcalfe, "At that point in my life, I felt marriage wasn’t about making a commitment to each other, it was like making a pact with the devil. Once you were married and had kids, you weren’t a free spirit any more. You had to think about cash. You’re more married to materialism. So it was a song about marriage being a contract with the devil. It annoys me when people don’t read past the cover."

== Single release ==
"Now We Are Married" debuted on the Official Charts at #86 before moving up to a peak position of #80 the following week. The single dropped to #96 in its final week on the chart. The single was released in multiple-formats including CD single, cassette single, 7" vinyl and two 12" vinyls, one of which was a limited edition with a gatefold sleeve featuring snaps of the band on tour in Europe.

The single was backed with cover versions of Velvet Underground's "Candy Says" (Metcalfe: "[It's] just me on an acoustic guitar, basically. I always loved the Velvet Underground and Lou Reed. It’s a really sweet song about a transvestite.") and Lee Hazlewood's "Friday's Child", recorded after Metcalfe heard Hazelwood's Nancy Sinatra duet "Summer Wine" in a junkie dive in Berlin. Impressed, it led to him discovering "Friday’s Child" on a companion album. "I just thought it was a brilliant song". The single was rounded out with an acoustic version of "Candlestick Park", which originally appeared on the band's debut album Good Deeds and Dirty Rags.

== Track listings ==
- UK 7" single Radioactive Records MCS 1506
- UK Cassette single Radioactive Records MCSC 1506
1. "Now We Are Married"
2. "Friday's Child"
- UK 12" single Radioactive Records MCST 1506
1. "Now We Are Married"
2. "Friday's Child"
3. "Candlestick Park II"
- UK CD single Radioactive Records MCSTD 1506
1. "Now We Are Married"
2. "Friday's Child"
3. "Candlestick Park II"
4. "Candy Says"
- UK 12" single Radioactive Records MCSTG 1506 (Gatefold sleeve)
1. "Now We Are Married (Extended)"
2. "Friday's Child"
3. "Candlestick Park II"
4. "Candy Says"

== Charts ==
Year	Chart	Position
1991	UK Singles (CIN)	80
