= The Velvet Underground (disambiguation) =

The Velvet Underground are an American rock band.

The Velvet Underground may also refer to:

- The Velvet Underground (album), 1969
- The Velvet Underground (book), by Michael Leigh, 1963
- The Velvet Underground (film), a 2021 documentary directed by Todd Haynes
