= Eric Kaz =

American singer-songwriter (born 1946)

Eric Justin Kaz (born 21 January 1946) is an American singer-songwriter born in Brooklyn, New York. Besides his solo work, Kaz was a member of Blues Magoos for their fourth and fifth albums, Never Goin' Back to Georgia and Gulf Coast Bound. Kaz has had many songwriting accolades and awards from ASCAP and CMA, top-ten hits in pop and R&B, number one country hits by George Strait and many others, as well as adult contemporary hits, including the number one hit song 'That's What Love is All About' by Michael Bolton. He also was a member of the band American Flyer along with Craig Fuller of Pure Prairie League, Steve Katz of Blood, Sweat & Tears, and Doug Yule of The Velvet Underground for two albums released on the United Artists label in the late 1970s.

== Music ==
Although Eric Kaz never achieved great commercial success as a performer, he has consistently been in the spotlight as a songwriter through the decades. Among his most popular compositions are:

- "Love Has No Pride" (with Libby Titus), a hit for Linda Ronstadt, also performed by Johnny Cash, Daryl Braithwaite, Bonnie Raitt, Susan Jacks, Tracy Nelson, Rita Coolidge, Lynn Anderson, Paul Young, Michelle Wright, Jane Monheit, Rod Stewart and Lana Wolf
- "Winter Light" (with Zbigniew Preisner and Linda Ronstadt), performed by Linda Ronstadt and Sarah Brightman
- "Cry Like A Rainstorm" performed by Bonnie Raitt and Linda Ronstadt
- "I Won't Be Hangin Round" performed by Linda Ronstadt
- "Gotta Get Away" performed by Randy Meisner
- "Angel" performed by Bonnie Raitt
- "River of Tears" performed by Bonnie Raitt
- "Sorrow Lives Here" performed by Linda Ronstadt
- "Still Hold On" performed by Kim Carnes, Tanya Tucker and Suzy Bogguss
- "There's a Need" (with Kiki Dee) performed by Kiki Dee
- "I Cross My Heart" performed by George Strait
- "The Vows Go Unbroken (Always True to You)" performed by Kenny Rogers
- "I'm Gone" performed by Alison Krauss & Union Station
- "Hypnotize the Moon" by Clay Walker
- "All I Have" performed by Beth Nielsen Chapman
- [I am] Blowing Away" performed by Bonnie Raitt, Linda Ronstadt, Cher, Joan Baez and American Flyer
- "Heartbeat" (with Wendy Waldman) performed by Don Johnson
- "I'll Always Love You" (with Tom Snow), performed by Michael Johnson and Anne Murray
- "hangs by a thread" 'performed & music by Tom Snow lyrics Eric Kaz Arista 1983

For Tracy Nelson, he contributed four compositions to her landmark gospel album, Mother Earth: Bring Me Home (Reprise Records, 1971, reissued on CD in 2005).

He also provided music, including the memorable theme song, for Brian De Palma's 1968 and 1970 films Greetings and Hi, Mom! (both starring Robert De Niro).
