= Blacker Than Black =

Single by Goodbye Mr Mackenzie

from the album Hammer and Tongs
- Released: 4 June 1990
- Recorded: Hansa Studios, Berlin, West Germany
- Genre: Alternative rock, new wave
- Length: 3:52
- Label: Parlophone; Radioactive Records (worldwide)
- Songwriter(s): Martin Metcalfe and Derek Kelly
- Producer(s): Terry Adams

Goodbye Mr Mackenzie singles chronology
"Love Child" (1990)	"Blacker Than Black" (1990)	"Now We Are Married" (1991)

"Blacker Than Black" is a 1990 single by Scottish alternative rock group Goodbye Mr Mackenzie. "Blacker Than Black" was the band's second and final single release under the Parlophone label, and preceded its parent album Hammer and Tongs by almost a year. In 1991, after Goodbye Mr Mackenzie had signed to Radioactive Records, "Blacker Than Black" was remixed and released as an international single and featured on their debut international album release, also titled Goodbye Mr Mackenzie.

== Background ==
"Blacker Than Black" was recorded in West Berlin around the time of the Fall of the Berlin Wall, at Hansa Ton Studios. The song's subject was the addiction, and gamble, of going to war. Metcalfe later explained: "["Blacker Than Black" is] just a bit of zydeco punk really!... with a nice bit of Ennio Morricone guitar".

== Release ==
The release of "Blacker Than Black" was timed to follow the band's support slot on Debbie Harry's two-week "Dirty Harry" tour at the end of May 1990. The day before the single release, Goodbye Mr Mackenzie performed "Blacker Than Black" at The Big Day festival on Glasgow Green, what was then the biggest outdoor concert held in Europe, and broadcast live on national television.

The single was released on multiple formats including CD single, cassette single, 7" vinyl and two 12" vinyls, one of which was a limited edition with a white vinyl and PVC sleeve. Rounding out the single package was b-sides "Mad Cow Disease", and an extended version of their debut album track "His Master's Voice", and a cover version of "Green, Green Grass of Home". "Blacker Than Black" debuted on the Official Charts at #77 before moving up to a peak position of #61 the following week. The single dropped to #84 in its third and final week on the chart.

Following the release of "Blacker Than Black", Parlophone dropped the band and cancelled the release of their second album. The earlier Debbie Harry slot proved fortuitous, as her manager Gary Kurfirst was impressed enough with Goodbye Mr Mackenzie to sign them to his label, Radioactive Records. In 1991, Radioactive Records released "Blacker Than Black" in European territories on CD, 7" and 12" vinyl backed with a cover version of Velvet Underground's "Candy Says" and Hammer and Tongs album cut "Bold John Barleycorn", which had been omitted from the band's international album release.

== Track listings ==
- UK 7" single Parlophone R6257
- UK Cassette single Parlophone TCR 6257
1. "Blacker Than Black"
2. "Green, Green Grass of Home"
- UK 12" single Parlophone 12R 6257
1. "Blacker Than Black - 12" extended version"
2. "Green, Green Grass of Home"
3. "His Master's Voice - 12" remix"
- UK 12" single Parlophone 12RPD 6257 (Plastic sleeve ltd edition)
- UK CD single Parlophone CDR 6257
1. "Blacker Than Black"
2. "Green, Green Grass of Home"
3. "His Master's Voice - 12" remix"
4. "Mad Cow Disease"
- European 7" single Radioactive Records MCS17794
1. "Blacker Than Black"
2. "Bold John Barleycorn"
- European CD single Radioactive Records MCD 17795
1. "Blacker Than Black"
2. "Bold John Barleycorn"
3. "Candy Says"

== Charts ==
Year	Chart	Position
1990	UK Singles (The Official Charts Company)	61
