= Willie Alexander =

American singer and keyboard player (born 1943)

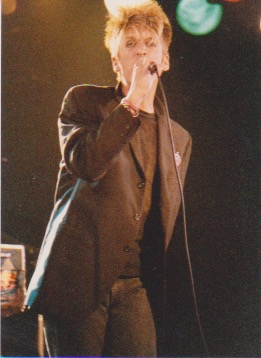
- Willie Alexander, 1988, The Channel (nightclub), Boston

Background information
- Also known as: Willie "Loco" Alexander
- Born: January 13, 1943 (age 83); Philadelphia, Pennsylvania, U.S.
- Genres: Art rock, protopunk, experimental rock, alternative rock, power pop, new wave
- Occupation: Musician
- Instruments: Keyboards, vocals
- Labels: MCA Records, New Rose Records
- Formerly of: The Velvet Underground

Willie "Loco" Alexander (born January 13, 1943) is an American singer and keyboardist based in Gloucester, Massachusetts.

He played with the Lost, the Bagatelle and the Grass Menagerie, before becoming a member of the Velvet Underground in late 1971, joining fellow Grass Menagerie alumni Doug Yule and Walter Powers and replacing Sterling Morrison, who had gone off to pursue an academic career.

With the Velvet Underground, Alexander toured England, Scotland and the Netherlands in support of then-current album Loaded. After completing the tour on November 21, 1971, in Groningen, the band planned to start recording a new album, but band manager Steve Sesnick sent all of the band but Yule home, presumably to retain maximum control of the product (the resulting album was Squeeze, released in 1973) and effectively ending Alexander's time with the band.

After leaving the Velvet Underground, he enjoyed a checkered career, both solo and with his Boom Boom Band, that lasts to this day. In-between, Alexander teamed up with Powers to tour France in 1982 for French punk record label New Rose Records, in 1987 opening for Dramarama and in 2006 for a tour with the Boom Boom band.

Alexander's 1975 single "Kerouac", was covered by Tim Presley on the album The Wink (Drag City, 2016) and his 1980 single "Gin" was covered by Luna on their covers album A Sentimental Education (Double Feature, 2017).

In addition to his storied music career, in 1994, Alexander narrated a local film entitled Middle Street made by fellow Gloucester native, independent filmmaker Henry Ferrini. Willie has also contributed many songs to the soundtracks for Henry's other films.

The band, Willie Alexander and the Fishtones, released the album I'll Be Goode (Fisheye Records) in 2016.

== Albums discography ==
=== Solo ===
- Solo Loco (1981 - New Rose Records)
- Taxi-Stand Diane (EP) (1984 - New Rose Records)
- Greatest Hits (1985 - Fan Club/New Rose Records)
- Tap Dancing on My Piano (1986 - New Rose Records)
- The Dragons Are Still Out (1988 - New Rose Records)
- Fifteen Years of Rock & Roll with Willie Alexander (1991 - Fan Club/New Rose Records)
- Willie Loco Boom Boom Ga Ga 1975-1991 (1992 - Northeastern Records)
- Private WA (1993 - Tourmaline Music)
- The Holy Babble (1996 - Tourmaline Music)
- Loco in Beantown (1999 - Tendolar)
- The New Rose Story 1980-2000 (4 CD's BoxSet) (2001 - Last Call Records)
- Solo Loco Redux (2002 - Captain Trip Records)
- Vincent Ferrini's Greatest Hits (2009 - Fish Eye Records)

=== Willie Alexander and the Persistence of Memory Orchestra ===
- Willie Alexander's Persistence of Memory Orchestra (1993 - Accurate Records)
- The Persistence of Memory Orchestra: The East Main St. Suite (1999 - Accurate Records)

=== Willie Alexander and the Boom Boom Band ===
- Sperm Bank Babies (1978 - Garage Records) (authorized bootleg)
- Willie Alexander and the Boom Boom Band (1978 - MCA Records)
- Meanwhile ... Back in the States (1978 - MCA Records)
- Pass the Tabasco (1996 - Mau Mau Records) (reissue of the two first albums)
- Loco Live 1976 (2001 - Captain Trip Records)
- Dog Bar Yacht Club (2005 - Fish Eye Records)

=== Willie Alexander and the Confessions ===
- Autre Chose (live, 1982 - New Rose Records)
- A Girl Like You (1982 - New Rose Records)

=== The Fish Eye Brothers ===
- When the Swan was on the Boulevard (2009 - Fish Eye Records)

=== With The Bagatelle ===
- The 11 p.m. Saturday LP (1968 - ABC Records)

=== With The Lost ===
- Early Recordings, Demos, Acoustic and Live 1965-1966 (1996 - Arf! Arf! Records)
- Lost Tapes 1965-'66 (1999 - Arf! Arf! Records)

=== With The Velvet Underground ===
- Final V.U. 1971-1973 (2001 - Captain Trip Records)

== Sources ==
1. Anonymous. "Velvet Underground ist wieder da!" In: Sounds, November–December 1971. Interview with the band. link
2. Henry Daniel. "Velvet Underground". In: Frendz, November 5, 1971. Interview with the band. link
3. Arjan de Weerd. "Despite All the Amputations, the Name of This Band Is Velvet Underground", July 2, 2004. Interview with Willie Alexander on his V.U. stint link
