= Goodwill City =

"Goodwill City / I'm Sick of You"

Single by Goodbye Mr Mackenzie

from the album Good Deeds and Dirty Rags
- Released: July 1989
- Recorded: Edinburgh, Scotland
- Genre: Alternative rock, new wave
- Label: Capitol
- Songwriter(s): Kelly/Metcalfe

Goodbye Mr Mackenzie singles chronology
"The Rattler" (1989)	"Goodwill City" / "I'm Sick of You" (1989)	"Love Child" (1990)

Goodwill City Live E.P.

EP by Goodbye Mr Mackenzie
- Released: June 1993
- Recorded: Edinburgh, Scotland
- Genre: Alternative rock, new wave
- Label: Blokshok Records

Goodbye Mr Mackenzie chronology
Goodbye Mr. Mackenzie EP (1991)	Goodwill City Live E.P. (1993)	Hard EP (1993)

"Goodwill City" is a 1989 single by Scottish alternative rock group Goodbye Mr Mackenzie. It was their final single release for EMI's Capitol Records, and released as a double A-side with a cover version of Iggy & The Stooges' "I'm Sick of You". "Goodwill City" was written by Martin Metcalfe and Derek Kelley, in response to their hometown of Edinburgh's reaction to the 1980s AIDS epidemic.

"Goodwill City" was taken from the band's debut album Good Deeds and Dirty Rags which was released earlier that year. In 1991, after Goodbye Mr Mackenzie had signed to Gary Kurfirst's Radioactive Records, "Goodwill City" was remixed and featured on their debut international album release, also titled Goodbye Mr. Mackenzie.

In 1993, Goodbye Mr Mackenzie self-released a "Goodwill City (Live)" EP featuring live versions of some of their tracks, and one studio track, "Working on a Shoe-fly", which was cut from the track list of their 1991 second album Hammer and Tongs.

== Track listings ==
- UK 7" single Capitol Records CL 538
- UK 7" single Capitol Records CLX 538 (Boxset)
- UK Cassette single Capitol Records TCCL 538
1. "Goodwill City"
2. "I'm Sick of You"
- UK 12" single Capitol Records 12CL 538
1. "Goodwill City"
2. "I'm Sick of You"
3. "What's Got Into You"
- UK 12" single Capitol Records 12CLG 538 (Gatefold sleeve)
- UK CD single Capitol Records CLCD 538
1. "Goodwill City"
2. "I'm Sick of You"
3. "What's Got Into You"
4. "Insidious Things"
- UK 12" maxi Blokshok Records BLOK001T (Gatefold sleeve)
- UK CD maxi Blokshok Records BLOK001CD
1. "Goodwill City" (Live)
2. "Mystery Train" (Live)
3. "Open Your Arms" (Live)
4. "Working on the Shoo-fly"

== Comprehensive charts ==
Year	Single	Chart	Position
1989	"Goodwill City"/"I'm Sick of You"	UK CIN Singles Chart	49
