= Walk It Talk It (disambiguation) =

"Walk It Talk It" is a 2018 song by Migos featuring Drake.

Walk It Talk It may also refer to:

- "Walk It Talk It", a song by Lou Reed from American Poet (1972)
- "Walk It Talk It", a song by Yung Wun (2004)
