= Billy Yule =

American rock drummer (born c. 1954)

William Yule (born c. 1954) is an American musician, best known for his brief stint as a temporary drummer for the Velvet Underground during their summer engagement 1970 at Max's Kansas City, sitting in for Maureen Tucker while she was on maternity leave.

== 1970 ==
When in early 1970, regular Velvet Underground drummer Maureen Tucker became pregnant and had to go on maternity leave, a temporary replacement was needed to fulfill the band's live obligations. Bassist Doug Yule, who had replaced founding member John Cale in 1968, proposed his younger brother Billy, then sixteen years old; he was accepted.

Yule started practising with the band (Doug Yule, Lou Reed and Sterling Morrison) immediately and made his live debut on June 24 at Max's Kansas City in New York City, during the two-month engagement the band had there. In addition to the residency at Max's, he played drums on two songs on the band's fourth album Loaded. He played with the band until the end of the engagement on August 28, after which they temporarily stopped activities to cope with the loss of lead singer Reed, who had abruptly quit on August 23. When they reconvened with Doug Yule moving to lead vocals and guitar and Walter Powers coming in on bass, Maureen Tucker also returned from maternity leave, ending Billy Yule's time with the band. Two sets from the engagement, one in July and the other on August 23, were taped and edited to form the Live at Max's Kansas City live album. Yule plays on all selections.

A final recording session for Loaded, which they recorded at the same time as the Max's Kansas City engagement, also featured Billy Yule on drums. Two of the songs recorded with Yule, "Lonesome Cowboy Bill" and "Oh! Sweet Nuthin'", made the album, while a third song, "Ocean", was included on the 1995 Peel Slowly and See box set.

== 1973 ==
A band featuring Billy and Doug Yule played the New England bar circuit in 1973, and was misleadingly billed as the Velvet Underground by the tour manager, despite the members' objections. In late May 1973, the band and the manager parted ways and the Velvet Underground name was laid to rest. The penultimate concert from this tour, on May 27, 1973, in Boston, was taped and eventually released on Final V.U. 1971–1973 (2001).

== Discography ==
All performances are with the Velvet Underground.

- Loaded (1970, two tracks)
- Live at Max's Kansas City (1972, recorded 1970, all tracks)
- Final V.U. 1971-1973 (2001, recorded 1973, ten tracks)
