= Hammer and Tongs =

Studio album by Goodbye Mr Mackenzie
- Released: 4 March 1991
- Recorded: Berlin, Germany (1989)
- Genre: Alternative rock
- Length: 44:30
- Label: Radioactive, MCA
- Producer: Terry Adams, The Mackenzies, Mack ("Diamonds")

Goodbye Mr Mackenzie chronology
Good Deeds and Dirty Rags (1989)	Hammer and Tongs (1991)	Five (1994)

Singles from Hammer and Tongs
- 1. "Love Child" Released: April 1990; 2. "Blacker Than Black" Released: 4 June 1990; 3. "Now We Are Married" Released: 11 February 1991

Hammer and Tongs is the second album from the Scottish rock group Goodbye Mr Mackenzie, released on 4 March 1991 by Capitol Records. It spawned three singles – "Love Child", "Blacker Than Black" and "Now We Are Married", each of which achieved moderate commercial success in the United Kingdom.

== Background and recording ==
It was recorded in Germany in 1989, at Berlin's Hansa Ton Studios just as the Fall of the Berlin Wall occurred. The album sat on the shelf for almost 18 months, in which time the band were transferred across EMI record labels, from Capitol to Parlophone, who released two singles from the album in 1990.

Parlophone sold the band's record deal to Radioactive Records and MCA, who released Hammer and Tongs in the United Kingdom in early 1991 and encouraged the band to record a new song "Now We Are Married" to promote the release.

Later that year, Radioactive, and their partners MCA, repackaged the album for international release by including several stand-out tracks from the band's debut album Good Deeds and Dirty Rags and eponymously re-titling the album as Goodbye Mr. Mackenzie.

== Release ==
"Love Child" was released as the lead single from Hammer and Tongs in April 1990. It achieved moderate success in the United Kingdom, peaking at number fifty-two on the UK Singles Charts and spent a total of two weeks on the charts. It was succeeded by the second single to be released from the album, "Blacker Than Black", which spent three weeks on the singles charts in the United Kingdom following a peak position of number sixty one.

Following the release of "Blacker Than Black", Parlophone dropped the band and cancelled the release of their second album. The earlier Debbie Harry slot proved fortuitous, as her manager Gary Kurfirst was impressed enough with Goodbye Mr Mackenzie to sign them to his label, Radioactive Records. In 1991, Radioactive Records released "Blacker Than Black" in European territories on CD, 7" and 12" vinyl backed with a cover version of Velvet Underground's "Candy Says" and Hammer and Tongs album cut "Bold John Barleycorn", which had been omitted from the band's international album release.

The third and final single to be released from the album was "Now We Are Married", which served as their first release on the Radioactive and MCA record labels. It spent a combined total of three weeks on the UK Singles Charts having peaked at number eighty. The album was released on 4 March 1991 and debuted at number sixty one on the UK Albums Charts, spending only one week within the UK Top 100 albums charts.

== Critical reception ==
Professional ratings
Review scores
Source	Rating
Allmusic	3/5 stars
Q	4/5 stars
Select	4/5

Paul Davies of Q Magazine called the album a "more than adequate follow up."

== Track listing ==
All songs written by Metcalfe and Kelly, except where noted.

1. "Blacker Than Black"
2. "Bold John Barleycorn"
3. "Diamonds"
4. "The Burning"
5. "Now We Are Married"
6. "Sick Baby" (Metcalfe, Kelly, Scobie, Wilson, Duncan)
7. "Down to the Minimum" (Metcalfe, Kelly, Scobie, Wilson, Duncan)
8. "She's Strong"
9. "Love Child"
10. "Tongue-Tied"

Unreleased Parlophone version

5. "Working on a Shoe-fly"

2006 Cherry Red re-issue bonus tracks

11. "Friday's Child" (Lee Hazlewood)
12. "Candelstick Park II
13. "Candy Says" (Lou Reed)
14. "Now We Are Married" (Extended version)

== Personnel ==
Goodbye Mr Mackenzie

- Martin Metcalfe - lead vocals
- John Duncan - guitar
- Fin Wilson - bass guitar
- Shirley Manson - keyboards, backing vocals
- Rona Scobie - keyboards, backing vocals
- Derek Kelly - drums

== Commercial performance ==
Chart (1991)	Peak position
United Kingdom (OCC)	61
