= American Flyer (band) =

American musical group

American Flyer was an American folk rock supergroup.

American Flyer formed in 1976 and released two successful albums on United Artists before disbanding in 1978. They also charted one minor hit, "Let Me Down Easy", which hit No. 80 on the U.S. Billboard Hot 100 in 1976. Their self-titled first album is also notable for having been produced by Beatles producer, George Martin.

== Members ==
- Craig Fuller (of Pure Prairie League)
- Eric Kaz (of Blues Magoos)
- Steve Katz (of Blood, Sweat & Tears)
- Doug Yule (of Velvet Underground)

== Discography ==
=== American Flyer (album) ===
American Flyer

Studio album by American Flyer
- Released: 1976
- Genre: Folk rock
- Length: 35:53
- Label: United Artists
- Producer: George Martin

American Flyer chronology
American Flyer (1976)	Spirit of a Woman (1977)

Singles from American Flyer
- 1. "Let Me Down Easy" Released: October 8, 1976; 2. "Back In '57" Released: 1976; 3. "Light Of Your Love" Released: 1976; 4. "Lady Blue Eyes" Released: 1976

Professional ratings
Review scores
Source	Rating
AllMusic	4.5/5 stars

==== Track listing ====
No.	Title	Writer(s)	Length
1.	"Light of Your Love"	Eric Kaz, Craig Fuller	2:54
2.	"Such a Beautiful Feeling"	Kaz	3:13
3.	"Back in '57"	Steve Katz	3:26
4.	"Lady Blue Eyes"	Doug Yule	3:14
5.	"Let Me Down Easy"	Kaz, Fuller	2:37
6.	"M"	Katz	3:51
7.	"The Woman in Your Heart"	Fuller	4:12
8.	"Love Has No Pride"	Kaz, Libby Titus	3:31
9.	"Queen of All My Days"	Yule	2:50
10.	"Drive Away"	Kaz	2:31
11.	"Call Me, Tell Me"	Fuller	2:36
12.	"End of a Love Song"	Kaz, George Martin	0:58

- Reached No. 87 on the Billboard 200.

=== Spirit of a Woman ===
Spirit of a Woman

Studio album by American Flyer
- Released: 1977
- Genre: Folk rock
- Length: 31:05
- Label: United Artists
- Producer: American Flyer, Ken Friesen

American Flyer chronology
American Flyer (1976)	Spirit of a Woman (1977)

Professional ratings
Review scores
Source	Rating
AllMusic	4/5 stars

==== Track listing ====
No.	Title	Writer(s)	Length
1.	"Spirit of a Woman"	Eric Kaz, Craig Fuller	2:32
2.	"Gamblin' Man"	Kaz	3:57
3.	"My Love Comes Alive"	Kaz	2:39
4.	"Victoria"	Steve Katz	3:18
5.	"Dear Carmen"	Kaz, Fuller	4:08
6.	"I'm Blowin' Away"	Kaz	2:33
7.	"Flyer"	Doug Yule	4:23
8.	"The Good Years"	Katz	4:17
9.	"Keep On Tryin'"	Kaz	3:18

- Reached No. 171 on the Billboard 200
