= New Age (The Velvet Underground song) =

1970 song by the Velvet Underground

Song by the Velvet Underground

from the album Loaded
- Released: November 1970
- Recorded: April–August 1970
- Studio: Atlantic, New York City
- Genre: Soft rock; doo wop
- Length: 5:11
- Label: Cotillion
- Songwriter: Lou Reed
- Producers: Geoff Haslam; Shel Kagan; The Velvet Underground

"New Age" is the fifth song on the Velvet Underground fourth studio album Loaded (1970). It is one of the four songs that feature Doug Yule on vocals, encouraged by main singer and songwriter Lou Reed. The song also appears on 1969: The Velvet Underground Live (1974), with Reed on vocals, singing an earlier, significantly different version of the lyrics.

In its original form, it was about Reed's girlfriend at the time, Shelley Albin, and included a possible reference to Reed's bisexuality: "It seems to be my fancy to make it with Frank and Nancy." The later studio version is written from the point of view of a fan addressing a "fat blonde actress".

When the album was released, this song caused controversy. Reed, who had left the band a month before, stated that his original versions of "Sweet Jane", "Rock and Roll" and "New Age" were corrupted. Doug Yule, on the other hand, insists that Reed's mixes were respected.

The Fully Loaded issue of the Loaded album (1997) includes an alternate version of "New Age", along with the other previously "corrupted" songs, subtitled "full-length version". It is about a minute longer than the LP version.

== Notable cover versions ==
The cover album Strange Little Girls (2001) by Tori Amos features a cover of the song (using the original lyrics).

== Personnel ==
- Lou Reed - guitars, piano, vocals
- Doug Yule - vocals, bass guitar, drums, organ
- Sterling Morrison - guitars
