= Meanwhile ... Back in the States =

Studio album by Willie Alexander & the Boom Boom Band
- Released: 1978
- Genre: Rock
- Label: MCA
- Producer: Craig Leon

Willie Alexander & the Boom Boom Band chronology
Willie Alexander & the Boom Boom Band (1978)	Meanwhile ... Back in the States (1978)	Pass the Tabasco (1996)

Meanwhile ... Back in the States is an album by the American band Willie Alexander & the Boom Boom Band, released in 1978. Its title refers to Alexander's immense popularity in France. The band supported the album with a North American tour.

== Production ==
Alexander wrote the songs, some of which incorporated elements of reggae and disco, between 1971 and 1978. He was influenced by beat writers, with many of the songs about the lives of societal outcasts and struggling musicians. Some of the song titles were changed from the demo and original versions, in order to please MCA Records. The album was produced by Craig Leon. "Pass the Tabasco" quotes a musical passage from "Double Shot (Of My Baby's Love)".

== Critical reception ==
Professional ratings
Review scores
Source	Rating
AllMusic	3/5 stars
Alternative Rock	6/10
Duluth News Tribune	8/10
The Encyclopedia of Popular Music	3/5 stars
Omaha World-Herald	2.5/5 stars
The Rolling Stone Record Guide	1/5 stars
Shreveport Journal	B
Toronto Star	4/5 stars

The Lincoln Journal Star called the Boom Boom Band "the leading Boston punk rock band", noting that Alexander "comes up with some intriguing street intellectualism." The Daily Illini stated that Alexander "prefers a slightly echoed deadpan delivery that was popular in the early '70s with David Bowie, Lou Reed and Mott the Hoople." The Boston Globe said, "The rock is grittier and more accessible, the Boom Boom band is more dynamically involved and Alexander has tightened his vocals into a more rhythmic style without sacrificing his offbeat charm."

The Shreveport Journal opined that "the band recalls the early Who"; The Buffalo News likened the sound to "pure Rolling Stones raunch". The Spokesman-Review said that Alexander "has the perfect punk voice". The Duluth News Tribune praised the "brilliant incoherence" and "flash of unique rock and roll genius." The Los Angeles Times noted the "slightly perverse, oddball charm", while concluding that the band had more in common with Bad Company than with new wave music. The Toronto Star called Meanwhile ... Back in the States "sleazy and definitely not chic."

== Track listing ==
No.	Title	Length
1.	"Mass Ave."
2.	"Modern Lovers"
3.	"You Looked So Pretty When"
4.	"Pass the Tabasco"
5.	"Melinda"
6.	"Hitchhiking"
7.	"R.A. Baby"
8.	"Sky Queen"
9.	"Bring Your Friend"
10.	"For Old Times Sake"
