= Squeeze (The Velvet Underground album) =

Studio album by the Velvet Underground
- Released: February 1973
- Recorded: Autumn 1972
- Studios: London, England
- Genre: Rock
- Length: 33:45
- Label: Polydor
- Producer: Doug Yule

The Velvet Underground chronology
Live at Max's Kansas City (1972)	Squeeze (1973)	1969: The Velvet Underground Live (1974)

Squeeze is the fifth and final studio album by the Velvet Underground, recorded in the autumn of 1972 and released in February 1973 by Polydor Records in Europe & Japan. By this time, Doug Yule was the only remaining member of the group; he wrote and recorded the album almost entirely by himself.

Yule had joined the Velvet Underground (replacing founding member John Cale) in October 1968, prior to the band recording their self-titled third album in Nov 68' to which Yule contributed vocals and all bass & organ duties. Yule had also contributed significantly to the band's 1969 live and studio recordings, as well as the fourth album Loaded. Following the departures of the remaining founding members (Lou Reed (in Aug. 1970 before the Nov. 1970 release of Loaded) and Sterling Morrison (following a show in Austin, Texas in Aug 1971), Yule took over guitar & vocal duties in the band and performed with new members alongside longtime drummer Maureen Tucker (who was slated to appear on Squeeze by Yule), but she was dismissed by the band's manager, Steve Sesnick.

Following a brief tour in the United Kingdom by Yule and a backing band to promote the album, Yule called it quits, bringing the Velvet Underground to an end until the 1993 reunion (from which Yule was excluded). Squeeze failed to chart and quickly fell into obscurity after its release. Nick Logan of the New Musical Express dismissed the record as a "Velvets-in-name-only album".

== Composition and recording ==
Following the departure of guitarist Sterling Morrison in August 1971, the final Velvet Underground lineup consisted of Doug Yule (vocals, guitar), Willie Alexander (keyboards, vocals), Walter Powers (bass guitar) and Maureen Tucker (drums). This version of the band had toured the United Kingdom and the Netherlands in October and November 1971 to support its latest album, Loaded, which had been written and recorded when Lou Reed was in the band, and which had seen a European release in March 1971. The plan was to record a second and final album for their record company, Atlantic Records, afterwards, but Atlantic lost faith and decided to issue an archive audience recording from 1970 featuring Lou Reed, Live at Max's Kansas City, instead.

After the tour, band manager Steve Sesnick managed to get a recording deal with Polydor UK to record a final Velvet Underground album. Alexander, Powers and Tucker were sent back to the United States by Sesnick, however, presumably for him to retain maximum control over the finished product. Thus, although Squeeze was released nominally as a Velvet Underground album, Yule was the only Velvet to actually perform on it. Yule later said, "I don't think Moe [Tucker] would have been expensive in money, but too costly in terms of 'management', meaning that she didn't take a lot of bullshit and would have taken a lot of 'handling' on Sesnick's part." Yule also recalled that the album "was done with just me. All the basic tracks were laid down with drums and me. Ian Paice of Deep Purple played the drums. So he and I would lay down a track. How much interplay can you have when all it is one guitar or a piano? You can hear that, it's kind of dead. I think you get more when you have 3 or 4 people playing together, they feed off each other, they work together and something comes out of it, it's bigger." Yule's and Paice's performances were augmented with occasional saxophone and backing vocals.

The eleven songs that make up Squeeze were written by Yule. He later recalled, "I remember sitting on a plane writing extensive notes on the mixing of the album. I sent it to Steve and none of my suggestions were taken, I'm sure he didn't even read it. He mixed it for the best possible commercial success. (...) It's really embarrassing. I gave what I had at the time. There are parts of it I hate and parts I don't. But if I had to do it over again, it would be a completely different album, with different people and have nothing to do with Sesnick."

== Release and reception ==
Professional ratings
Review scores
Source	Rating
AllMusic	1.5/5 stars
The Encyclopedia of Popular Music	2/5 stars
Rolling Stone	1/5 stars

Squeeze was recorded in the autumn of 1972 and released in the United Kingdom, France, Germany (all 1973), Spain (1974), and Japan (year unknown). No singles were taken off it and the album did not chart. Yule assembled a backing band consisting of Rob Norris (guitar), George Kay (bass guitar) and Mark Nauseef (drums) to tour the United Kingdom in November and December 1972 to promote the upcoming album; a live recording from this tour is included on the 2001 live box set Final V.U. 1971–1973. After the tour, during which they were deserted by Sesnick, Yule also called it quits, bringing the Velvet Underground to an end.

Squeeze saw a number of re-issues in France during the 1970s and early 1980s. It went out of print afterwards, until it received a compact disc and new LP release in 2012 by Kismet Records (see below). The status of Squeeze in the Velvet Underground's recorded canon was generally regarded as dubious well into the 1990s. In the mid-1970s, the NME Book of Rock counted it as "a Velvet Underground album in name only". No material from Squeeze been included in any official Velvet Underground compilation album; the 1995 CD boxed set Peel Slowly and See includes the four studio albums from the Lou Reed era of the band but excludes Squeeze. In the set's liner notes, David Fricke did not offer any analysis of Squeeze beyond dismissing it as "an embarrassment to the VU discography". AllMusic's Stephen Thomas Erlewine says "it doesn't just ride the coattails of VU's legacy but deliberately co-opts their achievement – but it's listenable, something its reputation never suggests". In March 2012, Classic Rock included the album at 28 in their list of The 50 Worst Albums of All Time.

In later years, the album was revisited by both critics and musicians with more favorable reviews. In 2011 music writer Steven Shehori included Squeeze in his "Criminally Overlooked Albums" series for The Huffington Post, and in a lengthy review of the album, offered the following positive assessment of Squeeze: "if you pluck it from the shackles of its murky back-story, Squeeze is nothing short of a quintessential listening experience." The UK band Squeeze took their name from its title according to band member Chris Difford, who also offered the following opinion of the album in a 2012 interview: "It's an odd record, but the name came from that, definitely. [...] In a retrospective way I really enjoy it. It has kind of a naivety about it". In 1995, Doug Yule described the recording of Squeeze being "like the blind leading the blind, me leading myself. That's what came out of it, I don't even have a copy of it. But it's kind of a nice memory for me and kind of an embarrassment at the same time. I wish I had my eyes wider open, but it was nice to get my name and my songs out there."

The song "Friends" was included by the indie rock band Luna on their covers album A Sentimental Education which was released in September 2017.

== CD release ==
In 2012, Squeeze received both a CD release and a new LP release from Kismet Records. On the CD, a slight amount of white noise can be heard throughout, indicating that it was recorded directly from an LP copy of the album. These bootleg reissues are not officially licensed from Polydor.

The reissues contain no outtakes. The packages do feature a short article from Melody Maker written by Richard Williams, originally published on 6 October 1971. The article features brief comments from Yule about the then-current UK tour that he was completing with original Velvet drummer Maureen Tucker and recently added members Walter Powers and William Alexander.

== Track listing ==
All tracks are written by Doug Yule.

Side one
No.	Title	Length
1.	"Little Jack"	3:27
2.	"Crash"	1:22
3.	"Caroline"	2:35
4.	"Mean Old Man"	2:53
5.	"Dopey Joe"	3:08
6.	"Wordless"	3:03

Side two
No.	Title	Length
1.	"She'll Make You Cry"	2:45
2.	"Friends"	2:39
3.	"Send No Letter"	3:12
4.	"Jack & Jane"	2:57
5.	"Louise"	5:44
Total length:		33:45

== Personnel ==
- Doug Yule – lead vocals, guitars, keyboards, bass guitar, producer

Additional musicians

- "Malcolm" – saxophone
- Ian Paice – drums, possible percussion
- Unidentified female backing vocals
