= Walter Powers (musician) =

American bass guitarist (1946–2026)

- Born: August 4, 1946; Boston, Massachusetts, United States
- Died: May 27, 2026 (aged 79)
- Genre: Rock
- Occupation: Musician
- Instruments: Bass, vocals

Walter Powers III (August 4, 1946 – May 27, 2026) was an American bass guitarist. He was a member of the Velvet Underground from late 1970 until late 1971.

Walter Powers was born in Boston, Massachusetts, United States. Before joining the Velvet Underground, he played with future co-Velvet Willie Alexander in Boston-based band the Lost from 1964 until 1967, during which time they toured with the Beach Boys, and from 1967 with Alexander and another future fellow Velvet, Doug Yule, in the Grass Menagerie. He was also the bass player for another Boston-based band called Listening (only album released by Vanguard in 1968 under the same name).

When Lou Reed left the Velvet Underground in late August 1970, Doug Yule assumed leadership of that band and moved from bass guitar to vocals and guitar. Yule asked Powers to join to fill in the bass spot; Powers played his first (known) gig with the band on November 19, 1970 in Bryn Mawr, Pennsylvania. Also in late 1970, the band, which at that time consisted of Yule, Powers, Sterling Morrison and Maureen Tucker, recorded two songs for Atlantic Records, the Doug Yule compositions "Friends" and "She'll Make You Cry", which remain unreleased (both songs would later be re-recorded with different personnel for the controversial 1973 Polydor album Squeeze).

During 1971, the Velvet Underground extensively toured the north and northeast of the United States and subsequently embarked on a short autumn tour of Europe in support of current album Loaded, playing gigs in England, Scotland, and the Netherlands. After completing the tour on November 21, 1971 in Groningen, the band planned to start recording a new album, but band manager Steve Sesnick sent all of the band but Yule home, presumably to retain maximum control of the product (the album Squeeze) and effectively ending Powers' time with the band.

Powers and Alexander toured France together in 1982 to support Alexander's then-current albums; Powers appears to have dropped out of music thereafter, having returned to Boston to work in the MIT Libraries.

== Discography ==
=== With Willie Alexander ===
- Solo Loco (released 1981)
- Solo Loco Redux (released 2002)
- Autre Chose: Live (released 1982)

=== With the Velvet Underground ===
- Final V.U. 1971–1973 (recorded 1971–1973, released 2001)
