= After Hours (The Velvet Underground song) =

Song by the Velvet Underground

from the album The Velvet Underground
- Released: March 1969
- Recorded: November – December 1968; TTG Studios, Hollywood; Sunset and Highland Sound, Hollywood
- Genre: Traditional pop
- Length: 2:07
- Label: MGM
- Songwriter: Lou Reed
- Producer: The Velvet Underground

"After Hours" is a 1969 song written by Lou Reed and originally performed by the Velvet Underground, "about a timid person watching others having fun and wishing they could join in". It is the tenth and final track on their eponymous third studio album. It is one of few songs with lead vocals by drummer Maureen Tucker, as Lou Reed stated the song was "so innocent and pure" that he could not possibly sing it himself. Tucker's vocals are accompanied by acoustic and bass guitar. The style of the lyrics and the music is somewhat reminiscent of Tin Pan Alley songs of the 1930s.

== Music video ==
In 2014, Universal Music Enterprises held a contest in collaboration with Genero to create an official music video for the song. From 120 submissions, the video by Choking Monkey Productions, directed by Oliver Chen and starring Paloma Lopez, was picked as the winner and subsequently uploaded to the Velvet Underground Vevo YouTube channel.

== Personnel ==
- Maureen Tucker – vocals
- Lou Reed – acoustic guitar
- Doug Yule – bass
