= NYC Man (The Ultimate Collection 1967–2003) =

Compilation album by Lou Reed
- Released: June 3, 2003
- Recorded: 1966–2002
- Genre: Rock
- Label: RCA/BMG Heritage
- Producer: Lothar Landt, Lou Reed, Rob Santos, Hal Willner

Lou Reed chronology
| The Raven (2003) | NYC Man (The Ultimate Collection 1967–2003) (2003) | Animal Serenade (2004) |

Professional ratings
Review scores
| Source | Rating |
|---|---|
| AllMusic | 3/5 stars |
| Rolling Stone | 4/5 stars |

NYC Man is a 2-CD anthology of Lou Reed's work. All songs of this career spanning collection were chosen, sequenced and remastered by Lou Reed himself.

Cover art: painting from Marie Pittroff

== Track listing ==
=== Disc 1 ===
1. "Who Am I (Tripitena's Song)" (Previously unreleased version) - 5:33
2. "Sweet Jane" – The Velvet Underground - 3:01
3. "Rock & Roll" – The Velvet Underground - 4:41
4. "I'm Waiting for the Man" – The Velvet Underground - 4:37
5. "White Light/White Heat" (Live) - 5:01
6. "Street Hassle; Waltzing Matilda / Street Hassle / Slipaway" - 11:00
7. "Berlin" - 3:23
8. "Caroline Says II" - 4:12
9. "The Kids" - 7:49
10. "Walk on the Wild Side" - 4:11
11. "Kill Your Sons" (Live) - 4:09
12. "Vicious " - 2:56
13. "The Blue Mask" - 5:01
14. "I'll Be Your Mirror" (Live) - 2:46
15. "Magic and Loss – The Summation" - 6:36
16. "Ecstasy" - 4:31

=== Disc 2 ===
1. "I Wanna Be Black" (Live) - 6:30
2. "Temporary Thing" - 5:14
3. "Shooting Star" - 3:11
4. "Legendary Hearts" - 3:05
5. "Heroin" (Live) - 8:21
6. "Coney Island Baby" - 6:36
7. "The Last Shot" - 3:23
8. "The Bells" - 9:20
9. "Perfect Day" - 3:43
10. "Sally Can't Dance" - 2:55
11. "Satellite of Love" - 3:38
12. "NYC Man" - 4:55
13. "Dirty Blvd." - 3:30
14. "Rock Minuet" - 6:56
15. "Pale Blue Eyes" – The Velvet Underground - 5:38
