= Open Your Arms =

Single by Goodbye Mr Mackenzie

from the album Good Deeds and Dirty Rags
- Released: 31 October 1988
- Recorded: Musicland Studios; Munich, Germany
- Genre: Alternative rock, new wave
- Length: 3:37
- Label: Capitol
- Songwriters: Derek Kelly, Martin Metcalfe
- Producer: Mack

Goodbye Mr Mackenzie singles chronology
"Goodbye Mr. Mackenzie" (1988)	"Open Your Arms" (1988)	"The Rattler" (1989)

"Open Your Arms" is a 1988 single by Scottish alternative rock group Goodbye Mr Mackenzie. It was their second major label single recorded for EMI's Capitol Records.

"Open Your Arms" later featured on the band's debut album Good Deeds and Dirty Rags which was released the following year. In 1991, after Goodbye Mr Mackenzie had signed to Gary Kurfirst's Radioactive Records, "Open Your Arms" was remixed and featured on their debut international album release, the self-titled Goodbye Mr. Mackenzie.

== Track listings ==
- UK 7" single Capitol Records CL 513
- UK 7" single Capitol Records CLG 513 (Gatefold sleeve)
1. "Open Your Arms" - 3:37
2. "Secrets" - 3:44
- UK 12" single Capitol Records 12CL 513
- UK 12" single Capitol Records 12CLP 513 (Picture disc)
1. "Open Your Arms" - 3:37
2. "Secrets" - 3:44
3. "Amsterdam" - 3:25 (Jaques Brel/Mort Shuman)
- UK 12" single Capitol Records 12CLG 513 (Gatefold sleeve)
1. "Open Your Arms" - 7:21
2. "Secrets" - 3:44
3. "Amsterdam" - 3:25 (Jaques Brel/Mort Shuman)
4. "Pleasure Search" - 3:32
- UK CD single Capitol Records CDCL 513
1. "Open Your Arms" - 3:37
2. "Secrets" - 3:44
3. "Amsterdam" - 3:25 (Jaques Brel/Mort Shuman)
4. "Pleasure Search" - 3:32

== Charts ==
Year	Chart	Position
1988	UK CIN Singles Chart	92
