= The Velvet Underground (book) =

Book by Michael Leigh

- Author: Michael Leigh
- Language: English
- Genre: Non-fiction
- Publication date: September 1963

The Velvet Underground is a paperback book by journalist Michael Leigh, published in September 1963, that reports on paraphilia in the US.

== Content ==
Leigh investigates "aberrant" sexual behavior between consenting adults; that is, everything other than simple intercourse conducted in privacy by a heterosexual couple, e.g., husband and wife swapping, group sex, sex orgy parties, homosexual activities, sado-masochism. The author reports on the various ways in which such practices are solicited (newspaper advertisements, clubs, etc.), and by following these leads, manages to get into touch with many of its participants, usually through written correspondence. The book liberally includes quotations from this material. This is complemented with quotes from various magazines.

The author's general aim is to establish that a shift in attitude toward sexuality is taking place in society that not only allows a large cross-section of the American population to partake in such non-standard sexual practices, but also allows them to believe that what they are doing is perfectly healthy and normal. A central passage in the book is a quote/paraphrase from a 1961 article in the French Esprit magazine, which calls this liberal attitude toward sex the sexual revolution, and attributes it to the general availability of contraceptives.

The book is ambiguous in tone, posing as an objective investigative report on a social phenomenon, while being, at the same time, full of subjective language reflecting the author's seeming moral bias against the practices and attitudes observed.

== UK edition and sequel ==
The Velvet Underground was republished in 1967 in the United Kingdom under the title Bizarre Sex Underground.

In 1968, Harry Roskolenko (1907–1980) brought out a sequel, The Velvet Underground Revisited, which was attributed to Michael Leigh, even though he had died in 1965.

== Band ==
The New York band the Velvet Underground, founded in 1964, was named after the book. Lou Reed and Sterling Morrison's friend, filmmaker Tony Conrad, found a copy lying in the street. Morrison has reported the group liked the name, considering it evocative of "underground cinema," and fitting, due to Reed's already having written "Venus in Furs", inspired by Leopold von Sacher-Masoch's book of the same name, dealing with sado-masochism.

== Bibliography ==
- Michael Leigh. The Velvet Underground. Macfadden Books MB 60–142, US, 192 pp., 1963
