= Love Child (Goodbye Mr. Mackenzie song) =

Single by Goodbye Mr Mackenzie

from the album Hammer and Tongs
- Released: April 1990
- Recorded: Hansa Studios, Berlin, West Germany
- Genre: Alternative rock, new wave
- Label: Parlophone
- Songwriters: Metcalfe and Kelly
- Producer: Wilf Smarties

Goodbye Mr Mackenzie singles chronology
"Goodwill City" (1990)	"Love Child" (1990)	"Blacker Than Black" (1990)

"Love Child" is a 1990 single by Scottish alternative rock group Goodbye Mr Mackenzie. It was their debut single release for EMI's Parlophone record label. "Love Child" was taken from the band's second studio album Hammer and Tongs, which was released the following year.

In 1991, after Goodbye Mr Mackenzie had signed to Gary Kurfirst's Radioactive Records, "Love Child" was featured on their debut international album release, the self-titled Goodbye Mr Mackenzie.

== Track listings ==
- UK 7" single Parlophone R 6247
- UK Cassette single Parlophone TCR 6247
1. "Love Child"
2. "Heroes"
- UK 12" single Parlophone 12 R 6247
1. "Love Child"
2. "Heroes"
3. "You Generous Thing You (Live)"^{1}
- UK 12" single Parlophone 12 RX 6247 (with free poster)
1. "Love Child - Dance mix"
2. "Heroes"
3. "Goodwill City - Cava 12" mix"
4. "The Rattler (Live)"^{1}
- UK CD single Parlophone CDR 6247
1. "Love Child"
2. "Heroes"
3. "Goodwill City - Cava 12" mix"
4. "You Generous Thing You (Live)"^{1}

^{1}Recorded live at the Town and Country Club, London on 20 June 1989.

== Charts ==
Year	Chart	Position
1990	UK Singles (CIN)	52
