= Candy Says =

Song by The Velvet Underground

from the album The Velvet Underground
- Released: March 1969
- Recorded: November – December 1968; T.T.G. Studios, Hollywood; Sunset and Highland Sound, Hollywood
- Genre: Pop; country; doo-wop
- Length: 4:05
- Label: MGM
- Songwriter: Lou Reed
- Producer: The Velvet Underground

"Candy Says" is the first track on the Velvet Underground's self-titled third album.

It is one of four songs that Lou Reed explicitly wrote in the voice of a female character, in the case of "Candy Says", a transgender woman, telling her experiences. Each would begin with the woman's name and then be followed by the verb "says". "Stephanie Says" was the first (later adapted into "Caroline Says" on his solo album Berlin).

Reed insisted bassist Doug Yule take the lead vocal, as he felt Yule's voice was better suited for the material. Reed said the song was also "about something more profound and universal, a universal feeling I think all of us have at some point. We look in the mirror and we don't like what we see...I don't know a person alive who doesn't feel that way."

The song was inspired by actress/model Candy Darling, and ranked as the 15th best Velvet Underground song by Alexis Petridis of the Guardian who described the song as "tender" and "melancholy" with backing vocals inspired by the doo-wop genre.

== Alternate versions ==
- 1970: On the live album Live at Max's Kansas City
- 1972: On the live album Le Bataclan '72
- 2003: Anohni on Reed's live album Animal Serenade
- 2005: Lou Reed joined Antony and the Johnsons on guitar for a quiet rendition of "Candy Says" on stage at Anohni's Carnegie Hall show.
- 2006: Anohni and Reed on his live album Berlin: Live At St. Ann's Warehouse
- 2013: Reed's last public performance, seven months before his death in October 2013. Performed with Antony and the Johnsons, this time in Paris on March 6 of that year.
