= American Poet (album) =

Live album by Lou Reed
- Released: June 26, 2001
- Recorded: December 26, 1972
- Venue: Ultrasonic Recording Studios (Hempstead, New York)
- Genre: Rock
- Length: 61:20
- Label: Easy Action

Lou Reed chronology
The Very Best of Lou Reed (2000)	American Poet (2001)	Legendary Lou Reed (2002)

Professional ratings
Review scores
Source	Rating
AllMusic	4.5/5 stars

American Poet is an album of an early solo concert by American rock musician Lou Reed, recorded live at Ultrasonic Recording Studios, Hempstead, New York, on Boxing Day (December 26), 1972 during the Transformer tour. The backing band are the Tots. It features material from The Velvet Underground and Reed's first two 1972 solo albums, debut Lou Reed and Transformer. The version of "Berlin" is the arrangement from that debut album. American Poet was released in 2001.

The album's cover photo is by Mick Rock, from the same photo shoot as the Transformer cover.

== Track listing ==
All tracks composed by Lou Reed

1. "White Light/White Heat" (4:04)
2. "Vicious" (3:06)
3. "I'm Waiting for the Man" (7:14)
4. "Walk It Talk It" (4:04)
5. "Sweet Jane" (4:38)
6. "Interview" (5:01) Remote broadcast from Ultra Sonic Recording Studios for Tuesday Night Concert series WLIR-FM
7. "Heroin" (8:34)
8. "Satellite of Love" (3:28)
9. "Walk on the Wild Side" (5:55)
10. "I'm So Free" (3:52)
11. "Berlin" (6:00)
12. "Rock & Roll" (5:13)

== Personnel ==
- Lou Reed – lead vocals and rhythm guitar

The Tots

- Vinny Laporta – guitar
- Eddie Reynolds – guitar, backing vocals
- Bobby Resigno – bass guitar
- Scottie Clark – drums
