= Sweet Jane =

Song by the Velvet Underground

Single by the Velvet Underground

from the album Loaded
- B-side: "Rock & Roll"
- Released: July 20, 1973
- Recorded: 1970
- Studio: Atlantic Studios (New York City)
- Genre: Proto-punk; rock; pop
- Length: 3:55
- Label: Atlantic
- Songwriter: Lou Reed
- Producers: Geoff Haslam; Shel Kagan; The Velvet Underground

The Velvet Underground singles chronology
"Who Loves the Sun" (1971)	"Sweet Jane" (1973)	"I'm Waiting for the Man" (1973)

"Sweet Jane" is a song by American rock band the Velvet Underground. Appearing on their fourth studio album Loaded (1970), the song was written by band leader and primary songwriter Lou Reed, who continued to incorporate the piece into live performances after he left the band.

When Loaded was originally released in 1970, the song's bridge was cut. The box set Peel Slowly and See (1995) and reissue Loaded: Fully Loaded Edition restored the missing section.

The song also appears on the albums Live at Max's Kansas City; 1969: The Velvet Underground Live; Peel Slowly and See; Live MCMXCIII; Loaded: Fully Loaded Edition; American Poet; Rock 'n' Roll Animal; Live: Take No Prisoners; Live in Italy; The Concert for the Rock and Roll Hall of Fame; Rock and Roll: an Introduction to The Velvet Underground; NYC Man (The Ultimate Collection 1967–2003); Live on Letterman: Music from The Late Show; and Berlin: Live At St. Ann's Warehouse.

== History ==
There are two distinct versions of "Sweet Jane" with minor variations, spread over its first four releases. The first release of the song in November 1970 was a version recorded earlier that year and included on Loaded. In May 1972, a live version recorded in August 1970 appeared on the Velvet Underground's Live at Max's Kansas City; this had an additional bridge that was missing from the Loaded release.

In February 1974, a live version recorded in December 1973 (similar to the Loaded version but with an extended intro and hard rock sound), appeared on Reed's Rock 'n' Roll Animal. The elaborate twin guitar intro on the Rock 'n' Roll Animal version was written by Steve Hunter and played by Hunter and Dick Wagner, two Detroit guitarists who would go on to play with Alice Cooper. Cash Box said that "this heavy rocker" has a "strong production and good hook" as well as "stunning lead guitar and Lou's inimitable vocals." Record World said that "With a style that generates pure excitement, sweet sounds abound!."

In September 1974, a down-tempo live version recorded in late 1969 was included on 1969: The Velvet Underground Live, with a different song structure and lyrics. When a restored version of the original release on Loaded was eventually unveiled on Peel Slowly and See in 1995 (and in 1997 on Loaded: Fully Loaded Edition), it turned out that some of the 1969 lyrics (notably the entire bridge as heard on Live at Max's Kansas City) had originally been included in the Loaded version as well, but were scrapped in the finished edit.

In a 2005 interview, former Velvet Underground member Doug Yule stated that the main signature riff of the song (as it appears on Loaded) was finalized in the studio just before the tracks were recorded, and it was achieved by Lou Reed's playing "cranked-up very loud" through a large Sunn amplifier. In addition to recording the bass track, the drums on the recording were performed by Doug Yule because Velvet drummer Maureen Tucker was pregnant at the time and not present during the Loaded sessions.

Lou Reed performed "Sweet Jane" in two keys. The 1969 and 1970 versions were in D as was 1972's American Poet version. On 1973's Rock 'n' Roll Animal and 1978's Take No Prisoners, the song is in E, and on 1984's Live in Italy, the song is back in D.

== Cover versions ==
"Sweet Jane"

Single by Mott the Hoople

from the album All the Young Dudes
- B-side: "Jerkin' Crocus"
- Released: March 1973 (US)
- Recorded: May–July 1972
- Studio: Olympic and Trident Studios (London)
- Genre: Glam rock
- Length: 4:21
- Label: Columbia
- Songwriter: Lou Reed
- Producer: David Bowie

Mott the Hoople singles chronology
"One of the Boys" (1972)	"Sweet Jane" (1973)	"Honaloochie Boogie" (1973)

- 1972: Mott the Hoople on the David Bowie-produced album All the Young Dudes, as its third single.
- 1988: Cowboy Junkies on The Trinity Session as their debut single. This version's arrangement is based on the slower version of the song released on 1969: The Velvet Underground Live. Lou Reed was often quoted as saying that the Cowboy Junkies' version was his favorite. It appears on the soundtrack album of Oliver Stone's 1994 film Natural Born Killers, as well as the fifth season of Stranger Things.

== Rankings ==
In 2004, Rolling Stone ranked it No. 335 on its list of the 500 Greatest Songs of All Time. In a 2011 update of the list, it appears at No. 342, and was moved up further to No. 294 in the 2021 iteration. In March 2005, Q placed "Sweet Jane" at No. 18 in its list of the 100 Greatest Guitar Tracks. Guitar World ranked "Sweet Jane" at No. 81 on its list of the 100 Greatest Guitar Solos.

== Personnel ==
- Lou Reed - vocals, guitars
- Doug Yule - bass guitar, drums, guitars, vocals
- Sterling Morrison - guitars
