= Steve Sesnick =

American talent manager (1941–2022)

Stephen Eugene Sesnick Jr.

Stephen Eugene Sesnick Jr. (September 8, 1941 – October 27, 2022) was an American rock club and rock band manager, and later a businessman. Sesnick is known for being the manager of the Velvet Underground.

== Early life ==
Sesnick was born in Hoboken, New Jersey, on September 8, 1941. He was educated at St. Cecilia High School in Englewood, New Jersey and he went on to play freshman basketball for St. John's University in New York City.

== Velvet Underground manager ==
Sesnick was manager of the Boston Tea Party, a Boston nightclub founded in 1967, which was the first in Boston to spearhead the burgeoning psychedelic rock and underground rock scene, and which also helped break bands which went on to become major stars. Sesnick was replaced in 1968 by Don Law.

The Velvet Underground shows at the Tea Party were particularly notable and the band became especially popular in Boston. Sesnick also knew the band from his involvement with Andy Warhol's Exploding Plastic Inevitable. After the Velvet Underground ended their association with Warhol and Paul Morrissey in 1967, they selected Sesnick to be their manager. Sesnick was also associated with Jonathan Richman at the start of his career.

Breaking up the Velvets was all Sesnick. You can't imagine how sleazy he could be... Sesnick dumped the second iteration of the band in England with no money and no equipment and just left us there to find our way back. He gave me 6 copies of Squeeze as pay. I never got any money... I would be told by him that I was better than Lou and that the others were not really my friends I should not confide in them and he did that to everybody... He makes used car salesmen look like Lancelot.

— Doug Yule

Over the next few years, Sesnick influenced the Velvet Underground to move toward a more "overtly pop direction" in their music. Doug Yule was encouraged to join the Velvet Underground when John Cale quit. Yule said "It was put into that sort of AM/hit-FM kind of format three to five minutes max, and very 'up' kind of stuff." Lou Reed later accused Sesnick of driving "a wedge between" him and Yule during the recording of Loaded in 1970, and Yule did aver that Sesnick favored him as the potential leader for a new Velvet Underground, minimizing Reed's role.

Sesnick owned the tapes that were to become 1969: The Velvet Underground Live. Sterling Morrison and Maureen Tucker signed over their rights to the tapes for $1,500 each ($9,793 in 2025 dollars).

== Businessman ==
By 1972, what was left of the Velvet Underground ceased operations, and Sesnick left the music business and became an avid golfer. He says he conceived the concept of the Skins Game, a yearly golf event where four top golfers competed head-to-head in a match play format. Extant from 1983 to 2008, according to Sesnick he came up with the idea, convinced some influential people of the worth of the concept, and began working on the project with the sports marketing company People & Properties. People & Properties then obtained buy-in from Arnold Palmer; this attracted wider attention, and bigger industry players stepped in and seized control of (and credit for) the property from Sesnick, he claims. Peter Chapman of People & Properties, could not corroborate Sesnick’s account, and said if "Steve has a different recollection I certainly couldn’t dispute it".

After this, Sesnick worked in golf as a consultant with organizations including Golf 20/20, First Tee, and TourTurf.

Sesnick was later part of a team at Florida Sustainables which developed technology for replacing plastic grocery bags and other plastic items with robust but degradable plastics, the research being partly funded by a $383,000 grant from the American National Science Foundation ($548,155 in 2025 dollars). This effort won the team the 2011 Cade Prize from the Cade Museum for Creativity and Invention.

Sesnick claimed to have invented improvements to the solar cell and licensed it for commercial development from the University of Florida through Sestar Technologies, a sort of parent company for Florida Sustainables, of which Sesnick was a co-founder and Vice President of Product Development.

== Personal life and death ==
Sesnick died due to complications from a heart attack in St. Augustine, Florida, on October 27, 2022. He was 81. He was survived by his wife Cynthia.
