= Loaded (Velvet Underground album) =

Studio album by the Velvet Underground
- Released: November 1970
- Recorded: April–August 1970
- Studio: Atlantic (New York City)
- Genres: Rock; pop; proto-punk; garage rock
- Length: 39:48 (original pressing); 40:35 ("full length" version)
- Label: Cotillion
- Producers: Geoff Haslam; Shel Kagan; The Velvet Underground

The Velvet Underground chronology
The Velvet Underground (1969)	Loaded (1970)	Live at Max's Kansas City (1972)

Singles from Loaded
- 1. "Who Loves the Sun" Released: April 1971; 2. "Head Held High" Released: 1971 (France); 3. "Sweet Jane" Released: July 1973

Loaded is the fourth studio album by the American rock band the Velvet Underground, released in November 1970 by Atlantic Records subsidiary Cotillion. It was the final album recorded featuring any of the band's original members; the lead singer and primary songwriter, Lou Reed, left the band three months before the album's release, and the guitarist Sterling Morrison and the drummer Maureen Tucker left the band in 1971. For this reason, it is often considered by fans to be the last "true" Velvet Underground album. The multi-instrumentalist Doug Yule remained and released the album Squeeze in 1973 before the band's dissolution the same year.

Though the album was intended to appease Atlantic's request that the Velvet Underground produce hit songs, none of the singles originating from Loaded nor Loaded itself succeeded in entering the charts. It has retrospectively gained critical acclaim; Loaded was ranked number 110 in 2012, and number 242 in 2020, on Rolling Stone's list of the "500 Greatest Albums of All Time".

== Background ==
Loaded was a deliberate attempt to gain radio play, while the album's title refers to Atlantic's request that the band produce an album "loaded with hits", with a double meaning about the word "loaded", which can also mean "really high on drugs". Singer and multi-instrumentalist Doug Yule said that "there was a big push to produce a hit single, there was that mentality, which one of these is a single, how does it sound when we cut it down to 3.5 minutes, so that was a major topic for the group at that point. And I think that the third album to a great extent shows a lot of that in that a lot of those songs were designed as singles and if you listen to them you can hear the derivation, like this is sort of a Phil Spector-ish kind of song, or this is that type of person song."

== Recording ==
Reed was critical of the album's final mix. He left the Velvet Underground on August 23, 1970, before Loaded was released that November. Reed consistently maintained that it had been remixed and resequenced without his consent.

One of his sore points was that the "heavenly wine and roses" section was cut out of "Sweet Jane". In the original recording, this part was intended to provide a perfectly flowing bridge to a full-fledged plagal cadence two-chord version of the chorus (earlier choruses in the song have a 4-chord riff). In Reed's initial solo performances, he would include the verse (see for instance American Poet), until 1973, when he would routinely leave it out, as the bridge fits less well in a more hard rock version (as heard for instance on Rock 'n' Roll Animal). However, the post-Reed, Yule-led band always performed the song with the verse included. A career-spanning retrospective of Reed's recordings with the Velvet Underground and as a solo artist, NYC Man (The Ultimate Collection 1967–2003), which Reed compiled himself, uses the shorter version. When asked about the shortened versions of "Sweet Jane" and "New Age" and Reed's long-standing claims that they were re-edited without his consent, Yule claimed that Reed had in fact edited the songs himself. "He edited it. You have to understand at the time, the motivation was... Lou was, and all of us were, intent on one thing and that was to be successful and what you had to do to be successful in music, was you had to have a hit, and a hit had to be uptempo, short, and with no digressions, straight ahead basically, you wanted a hook and something to feed the hook and that was it. 'Sweet Jane' was arranged just exactly the way it is on the original Loaded release exactly for that reason—to be a hit! 'Who Loves The Sun' was done exactly that way for that reason—to be a hit."

Reed also felt snubbed by being listed third in the album's sleeve credits, and by the large photo of Yule playing piano. Later releases satisfied many of Reed's concerns: he was acknowledged as the main songwriter and listed at the top of the band line-up, and the 1995 box set Peel Slowly and See contains mixes of his full versions of "Sweet Jane", "Rock & Roll" and "New Age".

Although she is credited on the sleeve, the album does not feature long term Velvet Underground drummer Maureen Tucker, as she was pregnant at the time. Drumming duties were performed mainly by bassist Doug Yule, recording engineer Adrian Barber, session musician Tommy Castanero and Yule's brother Billy. Reed commented that "Loaded didn't have Maureen on it, and that's a lot of people's favorite Velvet Underground record, so we can't get too lost in the mystique of the Velvet Underground... It's still called a Velvet Underground record. But what it really is is something else."

Sterling Morrison had strong feelings about Yule's increased presence on Loaded, saying: "The album came out okay, as far as production it's the best, but it would have been better if it had real good Lou vocals on all the tracks." While Morrison contributed guitar tracks to the album, he was also attending City College of New York and juggling his time between the sessions and classes, leaving most of the creative input to Reed and Yule. Yule claimed that "Lou leaned on me a lot in terms of musical support and vocal arrangements. I did a lot on Loaded. It sort of devolved down to the Lou and Doug recreational recording". Of the ten songs that make up Loaded, Yule's lead vocals were featured on four songs: "Who Loves the Sun", which opens the album, "New Age", "Lonesome Cowboy Bill", and "Oh! Sweet Nuthin'". In addition to his lead vocal parts, Yule handled all of the bass, piano and organ duties, and also recorded several lead guitar tracks. The guitar solos on "Rock and Roll", "Cool it Down", "Head Held High" and "Oh! Sweet Nuthin'" were all played by Yule.

Original copies of the album do not contain a gap between the first two songs, "Who Loves the Sun" and "Sweet Jane", with the first note of the latter being heard at the moment the former fades. Some later pressings break the segue with a few seconds of silence. All CDs of Loaded retain the original segue without the silence.

The artwork was designed by Stanisław Zagórski, features a drawing of the Times Square–42nd Street subway station entrance, with "downtown" misspelled as "dowtown".

== Reception ==
Retrospective professional ratings
Review scores
Source	Rating
AllMusic	5/5 stars
Blender	5/5 stars
Chicago Tribune	3/4 stars
Christgau's Record Guide	A
Encyclopedia of Popular Music	4/5 stars
Pitchfork	10/10
Q	4/5 stars
The Rolling Stone Album Guide	5/5 stars
Spin Alternative Record Guide	9/10
Uncut	8/10

Reviewing Loaded in Rolling Stone, Lenny Kaye wrote that "though the Velvet Underground on Loaded are more loose and straightforward than we've yet seen them, there is an undercurrent to the album that makes it more than any mere collection of good-time cuts". In The Village Voice, Robert Christgau said the music was genuinely rock and roll but also "really intellectual and ironic", with Reed's singing embodying the paradox.

According to the writer Doyle Greene, Loaded is "straightforward rock and roll" that abandons the band's earlier avant-garde and experimental music, while the songs "Sweet Jane" and "Rock & Roll" distinguished the Velvets as a "seminal proto-punk" act. "The trifecta of 'Who Loves the Sun,' 'Sweet Jane' and 'Rock & Roll' is among the best three-song openings on any rock and roll record", wrote Paste contributor Jeff Gonick. In Routledge's Encyclopedia of Music in the 20th Century (2014), music journalist Michael R. Ross regarded the album as "a near-perfect rock album", while Eric Klinger from PopMatters called it a "great" pop album. The music was also discribed as "hooky garage rock" by Billboard.

Loaded had sold 250,000 copies as of 2013. It was voted number 295 in the third edition of Colin Larkin's All Time Top 1000 Albums in 2000, ranked at number 109 on Rolling Stone's list of The 500 Greatest Albums of All Time in 2003, re-ranked at number 110 in the 2012 revision, then dropped to number 242 in the 2020 reboot.

== Track listing ==
All songs written by Lou Reed. (Note: Per BMI records. The album's packaging, both on the original release and on reissues, credits all the songs as "by The Velvet Underground" with no indication of which members wrote which songs.) All lead vocals by Reed, except where noted.

Side one
No.	Title	Lead vocals	Length
1.	"Who Loves the Sun"	Yule	2:50
2.	"Sweet Jane"		3:55
3.	"Rock & Roll"		4:47
4.	"Cool It Down"		3:05
5.	"New Age"	Yule	5:20
Total length:			19:57

Side two
No.	Title	Lead vocals	Length
1.	"Head Held High"		2:52
2.	"Lonesome Cowboy Bill"	Yule	2:48
3.	"I Found a Reason"		4:15
4.	"Train Round the Bend"		3:20
5.	"Oh! Sweet Nuthin'"	Yule	7:23
Total length:			20:38 40:35

- Note: The track lengths listed above are taken from the original LP label and jacket, which also reflect the "Full Length" versions; the original LP actually had shorter versions of certain tracks, but these changes were made after the labels were printed.

== Reissues ==
The album was officially released on CD on July 7, 1987, by Warner Special Products. Some of the running times located on the back of the CD case are incorrect. For instance, "Sweet Jane" is marked 3:55 while it is in fact about 3:18; "New Age" is marked 5:20 while it is closer to 4:39.

=== Peel Slowly and See ===
Loaded was compiled on the fifth disc of the comprehensive, five-year-spanning box set Peel Slowly and See, which was released on September 26, 1995, by Polydor Records. The disc features longer running versions of "Sweet Jane", "Rock & Roll", and "New Age" as well as demos, outtakes and live performances.

=== Fully Loaded ===
Rhino Records released Loaded (Fully Loaded Edition), a two-disc boxed-set, on February 18, 1997. It contains the full length version of the original 1970 album, Loaded, and an additional 17 previously unreleased tracks. It also contains numerous alternate takes, alternate mixes, and demo versions of Loaded singles. The set contains a 23 page booklet authored by music journalist David Fricke, and also features unseen session photographs of the band. A six-CD reissue of the album was released in October 2015.

== Personnel ==
The Velvet Underground

- Lou Reed – vocals, rhythm guitar, piano; lyrics, composition
- Doug Yule – vocals, lead guitar, acoustic guitar, organ, piano, bass, drums
- Sterling Morrison – lead and rhythm guitars
- Moe Tucker – drums (Note: Tucker is credited, but does not appear due to maternity leave. On the Fully Loaded edition, she does appear, singing on the outtake "I'm Sticking with You" and playing drums on the demo of "I Found a Reason".)

Additional musicians

- Adrian Barber – drums on "Who Loves the Sun"
- Tommy Castagnaro – drums on "Cool It Down" and "Head Held High"
- Billy Yule – drums on "Lonesome Cowboy Bill" and "Oh! Sweet Nuthin'"

Technical staff

- Adrian Barber – engineer
- Geoff Haslam, Shel Kagan and the Velvet Underground – producers

== Charts ==
Chart performance for Loaded
Chart (2015)	Peak position
French Albums (SNEP)	188

== Certifications ==
Region	Certification	Certified units/sales
United Kingdom (BPI)	Silver	60,000^{‡}
^{‡} Sales+streaming figures based on certification alone.
