= Doug Yule =

American songwriter, bassist, guitarist, keyboardist and singer (born 1947)

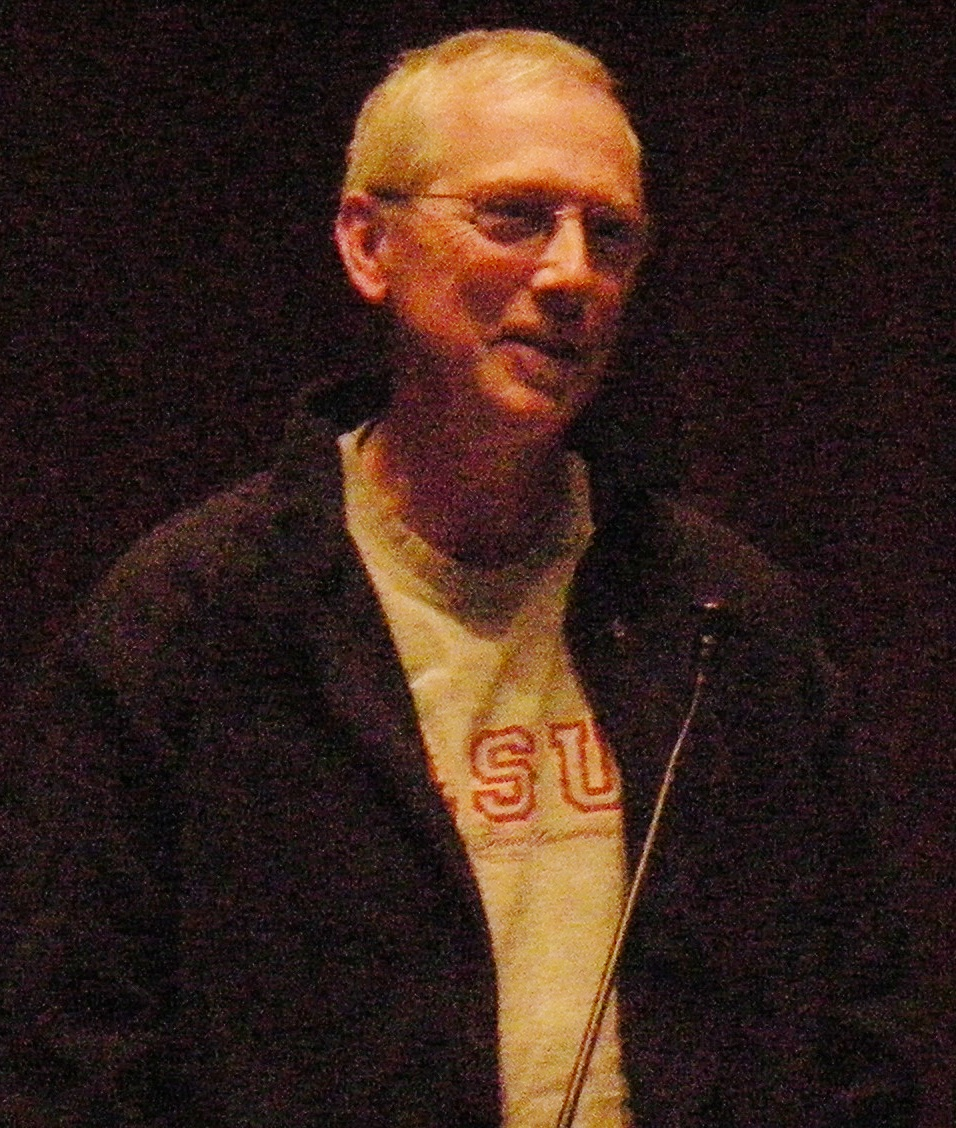
- Yule in 2009

Background information
- Born: Douglas Alan Yule; February 25, 1947 (age 79); Mineola, New York, U.S.
- Genres: Folk rock; pop rock
- Occupations: Musician; singer; songwriter
- Instruments: Bass guitar; guitar; vocals; keyboards; organ
- Years active: 1965–1977; 1997–present
- Formerly of: The Velvet Underground; American Flyer

Douglas Alan Yule (born February 25, 1947) is an American musician, singer and songwriter, most notable for being a member of the Velvet Underground from 1968 to 1973, serving as the bassist, guitarist, keyboardist, and vocalist.

== Biography ==
=== Early life ===
Doug Yule was born in Mineola, Long Island, New York, and grew up in Great Neck with five sisters and a younger brother. As a child he took piano and baritone horn lessons. He later said in an interview that he would have preferred violin lessons, but the violin had to be rented and the baritone horn was available free of charge.

In high school he played the tuba, as well as the guitar and the banjo, and sang in the church choir.

According to Yule he first got involved in music when at a show for the band The Barbarians and they didn't show up so he and his friends began jamming. "...In Boston, the Barbarians. And my roommate and I and a couple of other people got dragged down there, and the Barbarians didn’t show up, but we started playing with their instruments and eventually wound up in a band, and that’s kind of the way I got into rock and roll."

In 1965–66 he attended Boston University, where he studied acting. In Boston he met Walter Powers and Willie Alexander of the Grass Menagerie. In 1966–67, he played with the Grass Menagerie and other bands in New York, California, and Boston.

=== The Velvet Underground ===
==== 1968–1970 ====
Yule first met the Velvet Underground at his River Street apartment in Boston, which he rented from their road manager, Hans Onsager, and where the band would sometimes stay when they played in the city. Yule's improving guitar technique caught the ear of Sterling Morrison.

When John Cale left the Velvet Underground at the behest of Lou Reed in 1968, Yule joined the band (then consisting of Reed, Morrison and Maureen "Moe" Tucker) as Cale's replacement. Yule made his first studio appearance on their third album, The Velvet Underground (1969), playing bass and organ. As well as singing lead vocals on the ballad "Candy Says", which opens the album, he harmonizes with Reed on "Jesus" and co-sings the chorus of the album's penultimate track, "The Murder Mystery", with Maureen Tucker.

His contribution to the LP was considerable, and his vocals would later come in handy on the road. When Reed's voice became strained from touring, Yule would sing lead on several songs. While Cale had been a more experimental bass player, Yule was considered more technically proficient on the instrument and his distinct melodic style suited Reed's desire to move the band into a more mainstream direction.

Yule's role became even more prominent on the band's fourth album, Loaded (1970), singing lead vocals on "Who Loves the Sun", "New Age", "Lonesome Cowboy Bill", and "Oh! Sweet Nuthin'", and playing six instruments, including keyboard and drums.

Yule's brother Billy also joined in on the sessions as a drummer when regular drummer Maureen Tucker was pregnant and therefore absent for most of the recording. His lead vocals can also be heard on the song "Ride Into the Sun", which was featured on the Fully Loaded CD reissue of Loaded that was released in 1997.

==== 1970–1973 (Loaded tour and final Velvet Underground shows) ====
Lou Reed left the Velvet Underground during their summer residency at the New York club Max's Kansas City in August 1970. With band manager Steve Sesnick looking to fill pending bookings, and with the upcoming release of Loaded in November of that year, Yule, Tucker and Morrison decided to continue performing as the Velvet Underground to promote the album. Yule took over lead vocals and switched his main instrument from bass to guitar, and Walter Powers was recruited as the Velvets' new bass guitarist. Following the release of Loaded in Europe in the spring of 1971, Morrison left the group in August to resume his academic studies in Texas, and was replaced by Willie Alexander on keyboards. Alexander, Powers and Tucker left the Velvets in late 1972 after being forced out by manager Steve Sesnick prior to a handful of European shows to promote Loaded in Europe. With no original band members left, and with a group of quickly assembled musicians, Yule played the final shows as the Velvet Underground in 1972. With Ian Paice of Deep Purple and some session musicians, Yule recorded the album Squeeze in late 1972. It was released in February 1973, and is in essence a Doug Yule solo album, though presented as a Velvet Underground album due to band manager Steve Sesnick's contractual agreement with Polydor, and due to the success of Live at Max's Kansas City, which had received positive reviews the previous year. After two final shows in early 1973 (billed by the promoter as "The Velvet Underground", against Yule's wishes), the band was officially retired.

==== Lou Reed session work (1974–1976) ====
In 1974 Reed contacted Yule to contribute a melodic bass track on his solo album Sally Can't Dance (1974), on the song "Billy", which closes the album, and Yule joined Reed's band for the subsequent US and European tour as his guitar player. Following the tour the band dissolved, but Yule was called back by Reed in 1975 to record several guitar and bass tracks for his upcoming album Coney Island Baby, the 30th anniversary re-issue of which includes the bonus tracks that feature Yule on bass and guitar.

==== 1976–1978 (Elliott Murphy, American Flyer and hiatus from music) ====
In early 1976 Yule played guitar on Night Lights (1976) by Elliott Murphy, and joined the band American Flyer later that year as their drummer, also contributing backing vocals.

American Flyer was an active country rock band from 1976 to 1978, and the band also featured the guitarist Steve Katz of Blood, Sweat & Tears. After securing a major-label contract with United Artists, and managing to interest George Martin enough to bring him on board as their producer, American Flyer's debut album American Flyer debuted at #87 on the Billboard Top 200, and they even scored a minor hit with their single "Let Me Down Easy" which debuted at #80 in 1976.

Despite the promise showed on their first album, their follow-up album Spirit of a Woman failed to chart as high, and did not carry the momentum the label expected, and the band decided to fold. After American Flyer disbanded, Yule retired from doing music full-time, and became a cabinetmaker and a luthier of violins.

=== 1990–present ===
When the Velvet Underground reformed in early 1993, Sterling Morrison had campaigned for Yule's involvement, but Lou Reed and John Cale ultimately overruled him, thus leaving Yule off the band's six-week reunion tour of Europe, and the subsequent live album Live MCMXCIII. Following the continual interest in the Velvet Underground, and partly due to the publicity of the band's released box set Peel Slowly and See in 1995, Yule, who had by then moved to the San Francisco Bay Area, returned to public life, again giving interviews to journalists and various fanzines about his time in the Velvet Underground. He also wrote an obituary for Sterling Morrison, who had died in 1995.

Yule was not included along with the original line-up for the Rock and Roll Hall of Fame when the Velvet Underground were inducted in 1996. However, Yule remains a member of the Velvet business partnership, and continued to give the occasional interview about his time in the group. After having taken up the violin, Yule began to record music again in 1997.

A song called "Beginning To Get It" appeared on the benefit compilation A Place to Call Home in 1998. He played some concerts in 2000, while the live album Live in Seattle was released in Japan in 2002. He featured on Tucker's live album Moe Rocks Terrastock.

On August 31, 2006, Yule performed for the first time in public in New York City in over 30 years with Mark Gardener of Ride at Pianos. On December 8, 2009, he appeared with Reed and Tucker at the New York Public Library, to commemorate the publishing of The Velvet Underground – New York Art, a collection of rare photographs of the band's first performance in New York City to Andy Warhol's cover designs. They conducted a Q&A with a sold-out live audience, and David Fricke acted as moderator to the event.

== Discography ==
=== With the Velvet Underground ===
- The Velvet Underground (1969)
- Loaded (1970)
- Live at Max's Kansas City (1972)
- Squeeze (1973)
- 1969: The Velvet Underground Live (1974)
- VU (outtakes compilation, 1985 [1968–1969])
- Another View (outtakes compilation, 1986 [1967–1969])
- Chronicles (compilation, 1991)
- Peel Slowly and See (box set, 1995 [1965–1970])
- Final V.U. 1971-1973 (live box set, 2001 [1971–1973])
- Bootleg Series Volume 1: The Quine Tapes (live, 2001 [1969])
- The Very Best of the Velvet Underground (best of, 2003 [1966–1970])
- The Complete Matrix Tapes (live, 2015 [1969])

=== With Lou Reed ===
- Sally Can't Dance (1974)
- Coney Island Baby: 30th Anniversary Edition (1975, 2005)
- Between Thought and Expression: The Lou Reed Anthology (1992)

=== With American Flyer ===
- American Flyer (1976)
- Spirit of a Woman (1977)

=== Solo ===
- Live in Seattle (2002)

=== With RedDog ===
- Hard Times (2009)
- Nine-Tail Cat (2011)

=== Other ===
- Elliott Murphy: Night Lights (1976)
- Maureen Tucker: Moe Rocks Terrastock (2002)
- The Loves: ...Love You (2010)
