= The Velvet Underground =

American rock band

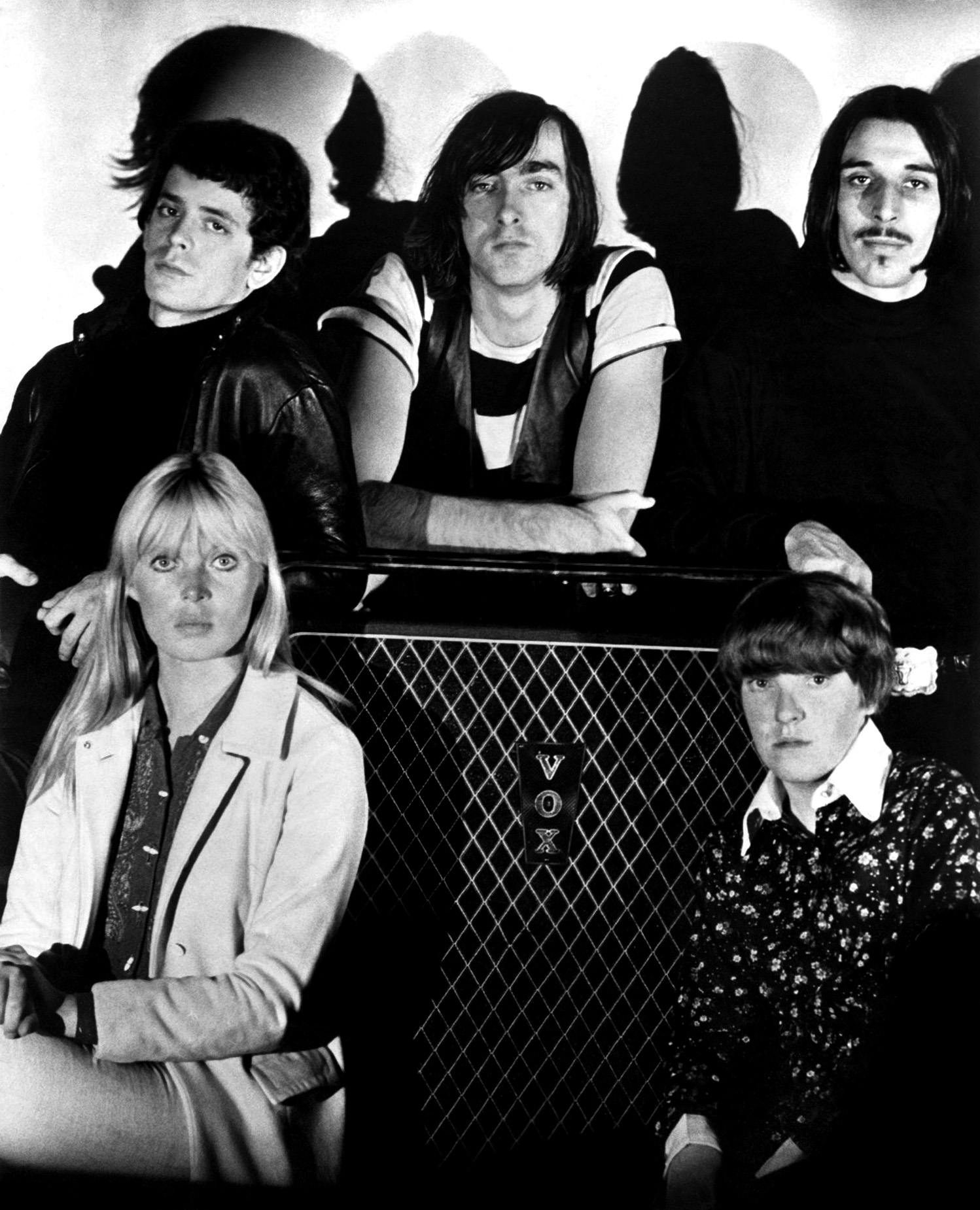
- The Velvet Underground and Nico in 1966. Clockwise from top left: Lou Reed, Sterling Morrison, John Cale, Moe Tucker and Nico.

Background information
- Also known as: The Warlocks; The Falling Spikes; The Velvets
- Origin: New York City, U.S.
- Genres: Art rock; proto-punk; experimental rock; garage rock; pop
- Years active: 1964–1973; 1990; 1992–1993; 1996
- Labels: Verve; Atlantic; Polydor; MGM; Mercury; Cotillion
- Spinoff of: Theatre of Eternal Music
- Members: Lou Reed; John Cale; Sterling Morrison; Angus MacLise; Moe Tucker; Doug Yule; Billy Yule; Walter Powers; Willie Alexander
- Website: velvetundergroundmusic.com

The Velvet Underground was an American rock band formed in New York City in 1964. They became known for their integration of rock and roll and the avant-garde, which earned them little commercial success during their initial nine-year run but made them one of the most influential bands of their era, particularly in underground, experimental, and alternative music scenes. Their provocative subject matter and experimentation were instrumental in the development of punk rock, new wave and other genres.

The group performed under several names before settling on the Velvet Underground in 1965, taken from the title of a 1963 book on atypical sexual behavior. Its classic lineup consisted of singer and guitarist Lou Reed, Welsh multi-instrumentalist John Cale, guitarist Sterling Morrison, and percussionist Moe Tucker. In 1966, pop artist Andy Warhol became their official manager. They served as the house band at Warhol's studio, The Factory, and performed with his traveling multimedia show, Exploding Plastic Inevitable, from 1966 to 1967. Their debut album, The Velvet Underground & Nico (1967), featuring the German singer and model Nico, was released to critical indifference and poor sales, although it has since been hailed as one of the greatest albums in music history.

In 1968, the band released their second album, the noise-saturated White Light/White Heat, after which Cale was replaced with Doug Yule. Aiming for mainstream success, the two following albums, The Velvet Underground (1969) and Loaded (1970), sold below the expectations of record labels and de facto group leader Reed. In the early 1970s, all but Yule left the band and a final album was released under the Velvet Underground name in 1973, Squeeze, recorded mostly by Yule with Ian Paice of Deep Purple and other session musicians in London. The Velvet Underground dissolved shortly after.

The former band members collaborated on each other's solo work throughout the 1970s and 1980s, and an album of long lost recordings of original songs, VU, was released in 1985. Reed, Cale, Tucker and Morrison reunited for a series of well-received shows in 1993, and released a live album from the tour, Live MCMXCIII, later that year. After Morrison's death in 1995, the remaining members performed at their Rock and Roll Hall of Fame induction in 1996. In 2004, the Velvet Underground were ranked number 19 on Rolling Stone's list of the "100 Greatest Artists of All Time". Following Reed's death in 2013, the group received the Grammy Lifetime Achievement Award in 2017.

== History ==
=== Pre-career and early stages (1964–1966) ===
The foundations for what would become the Velvet Underground were laid in late 1964. Singer-songwriter and guitarist Lou Reed had performed with a few short-lived garage bands and had worked as a songwriter for Pickwick Records (Reed described his tenure there as being "a poor man's Carole King"). Reed met John Cale, a Welshman who had moved to the United States to study classical music upon securing a Leonard Bernstein scholarship. Cale had worked with experimental composers John Cage, Cornelius Cardew and La Monte Young, and had performed with Young's Theatre of Eternal Music, though he was also interested in rock music. Young's use of extended drones would be a profound influence on the band's early sound. Cale was pleasantly surprised to discover that Reed's experimentalist tendencies were similar to his own: Reed sometimes used alternative guitar tunings to create a droning sound. The pair rehearsed and performed together; their partnership and shared interests built the path towards what would later become the Velvet Underground.

Reed's first group with Cale was the Primitives, a short-lived group assembled to issue budget-priced recordings and support an anti-dance single written by Reed, "The Ostrich", to which Cale added a viola passage. Reed and Cale recruited Sterling Morrison—a college classmate of Reed's at Syracuse University—as a replacement for Walter De Maria, who had been a third member of the Primitives. Reed and Morrison both played guitars, Cale played viola, keyboards and bass and Angus MacLise joined on percussion to complete the initial four-member unit. This quartet was first called the Warlocks, then the Falling Spikes. The Velvet Underground by Michael Leigh was a contemporary mass market paperback about the secret sexual subculture of the early 1960s; Cale's friend and Dream Syndicate associate Tony Conrad showed it to the group, and MacLise made a suggestion to adopt the title as the band's name. According to Reed and Morrison, the group liked the name, considering it evocative of "underground cinema", and fitting, as Reed had already written "Venus in Furs", a song inspired by Leopold von Sacher-Masoch's book of the same name, which dealt with masochism. The band immediately and unanimously adopted "The Velvet Underground" as its new name in November 1965.

The newly named Velvet Underground rehearsed and performed in New York City. Their music was generally much more relaxed than it would later become: Cale described this era as reminiscent of beat poetry, with MacLise playing gentle "pitter and patter rhythms behind the drone".

In July 1965, Reed, Cale and Morrison recorded a demo tape at their Ludlow Street loft without MacLise, because he refused to be tied down to a schedule and would turn up to band practice sessions only when he wanted. When he briefly returned to Britain, Cale attempted to give a copy of the tape to Marianne Faithfull, hoping she would pass it on to Mick Jagger, lead singer of the Rolling Stones. Nothing ever came of this, but the demo was eventually released on the 1995 box set Peel Slowly and See.

Manager and music journalist Al Aronowitz arranged for the group's first paying gig—$75 ($766 in 2025 dollars) to play at Summit High School, in Summit, New Jersey, opening for the Myddle Class. When they decided to take the gig, MacLise abruptly left the group, protesting what he considered a sellout; he was also unwilling to be told when to start and stop playing. "Angus was in it for art", Morrison reported.

MacLise was replaced by Maureen "Moe" Tucker, the younger sister of Morrison's friend Jim Tucker. Tucker's playing style was rather unusual: she generally played standing up rather than seated and had an abbreviated drum setup of tom-toms, snare and an upturned bass drum, using mallets as often as drumsticks, and rarely using cymbals (she admits that she always hated cymbals). When the band asked her to do something unusual, she turned her bass drum on its side and played standing up. After her drums were stolen from one club, she replaced them with garbage cans brought in from outside. Her rhythms, at once simple and exotic (influenced by the likes of Babatunde Olatunji and Bo Diddley as well as Charlie Watts of the Rolling Stones), became a vital part of the group's music, despite Cale's initial objections to the presence of a female drummer. The group earned a regular paying gig at the Café Bizarre and gained an early reputation as a promising ensemble.

=== Andy Warhol and the Exploding Plastic Inevitable (1966–1967) ===
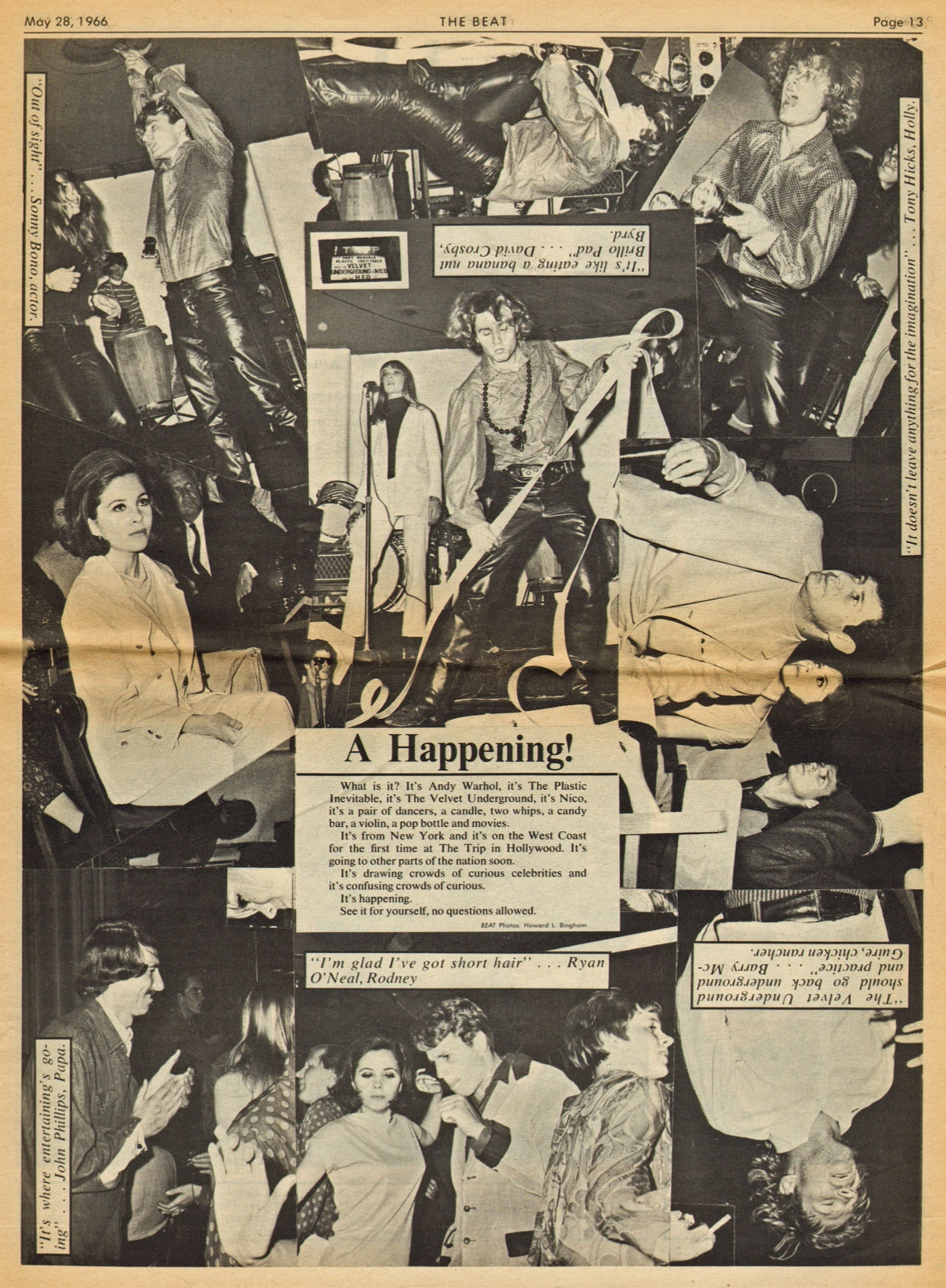
The Velvet Underground featured in the May 28, 1966, issue of KRLA Beat

In 1965, after being introduced to the Velvet Underground by filmmaker Barbara Rubin, Andy Warhol became the band's manager and suggested they use the German-born singer Nico (born Christa Päffgen) on several songs. Warhol's reputation helped the band gain a higher profile. He helped the band secure a recording contract with MGM's Verve Records, with himself as nominal "producer", and gave the Velvets free rein over the sound they created.

During their stay with Andy Warhol, the band became part of his multimedia roadshow, Exploding Plastic Inevitable, which combined Warhol's films with the band's music, which made use of minimalist devices, such as drones. Warhol included the band with his show in an effort to "use rock as a part of a larger, interdisciplinary-art work based around performance" (McDonald). They played shows for several months in New York City, then traveled throughout the United States and Canada until its last installment in May 1967. During a short period in September 1966, when Cale was ill, the avant-garde musician Henry Flynt and Reed's friend Richard Mishkin took turns to cover for him.

The show included 16 mm film projections by Warhol, combined with a stroboscopic-light show designed by Danny Williams. Because of the punishing lights, the band took to wearing sunglasses onstage. Early promo posters referred to the group as the "erupting plastic inevitable". This soon changed to "the exploding plastic inevitable".

In 1966, MacLise temporarily rejoined the Velvet Underground for a few EPI shows when Reed was suffering from hepatitis and unable to perform. For these appearances, Cale sang and played organ, Tucker switched to bass guitar and MacLise was on drums. Also at these appearances, the band often played an extended jam they had dubbed "Booker T", after musician Booker T. Jones. Some of these performances have been released as a bootleg; they remain the only record of MacLise with the Velvet Underground.

According to Morrison, MacLise is said to have regretted leaving the Velvet Underground and wanted to rejoin, but Reed specifically prohibited this and made it clear that this stint was only temporary. MacLise still behaved eccentrically with time and commerce and went by his own clock: for instance, he showed up half an hour late to one show and carried on with a half-hour of drumming to compensate for his late arrival, long after the set had finished.

In December 1966, Warhol and David Dalton designed Issue 3 of the multimedia Aspen. Included in this issue of the "magazine", which retailed at $4 ($40 in 2025 dollars) per copy and was packaged in a hinged box designed to look like Fab laundry detergent, were various leaflets and booklets, one of which was a commentary on rock and roll by Lou Reed, another an EPI promotional newspaper. Also enclosed was a 2-sided flexi disk: side one produced by Peter Walker, a musical associate of Timothy Leary; and side two titled "Loop", credited to the Velvet Underground but actually recorded by Cale alone. "Loop", a recording solely of pulsating audio feedback culminating in a locked groove, was "a precursor to [Reed's] Metal Machine Music", say Velvets archivists M.C. Kostek and Phil Milstein in the book The Velvet Underground Companion. "Loop" also predates much industrial music.

=== The Velvet Underground & Nico (1967) ===
At Warhol's insistence, Nico sang with the band on three songs of their debut album, The Velvet Underground & Nico. The album was recorded primarily in Scepter Studios in New York City during April 1966, but for reasons unclear, some songs were rerecorded at TTG Studios in Los Angeles, along with the new song "Sunday Morning", later in the year with Tom Wilson producing. The album was released by Verve Records the following year in March 1967. The album cover is famous for its Warhol design: a yellow banana sticker with "Peel slowly and see" printed near the tip. Those who did remove the banana skin found a pink, peeled banana beneath.

Eleven songs showcased the Velvets' dynamic range, veering from the pounding attacks of "I'm Waiting for the Man" and "Run Run Run", the droning "Venus in Furs" and "Heroin", the chiming and celestial "Sunday Morning", to the quiet "Femme Fatale" and the tender "I'll Be Your Mirror", as well as Warhol's own favorite song of the group, "All Tomorrow's Parties". Kurt Loder would later describe "All Tomorrow's Parties" as a "mesmerizing gothic-rock masterpiece". Closing out the album was the avant-garde "The Black Angel's Death Song", followed by the lengthy, feedback-laden "European Son", which Reed dedicated to his Syracuse professor Delmore Schwartz.

The overall sound was propelled by Reed and Nico's deadpan vocals, Cale's droning viola, bass and keyboards, Reed's experimental avant-garde guitar, Morrison's often R&B- or country-influenced guitar, and Tucker's simple but steady and tribal-sounding beat with her sparse use of cymbals. A technique used on many songs was the "drone strum", an eighth-note rhythm guitar style used by Reed. Although Cale was the band's usual bassist, if he switched to viola or keyboards, Morrison would normally play bass. Despite his proficiency on the instrument, Morrison hated playing bass. Conversely, some songs had Reed and Morrison playing their usual guitars with Cale on viola or keyboards, but with nobody playing bass.

The album was released by early March 1967, though the exact release date is uncertain. (Note: Some sources do not specify the release date beyond March 1967, while others date it to March 12. The author Richie Unterberger describes the latter date as "probably [erroneous]"; he instead suggests it was likely out by March 4 at the latest, adding there is evidence that some copies were possibly on sale "a little before March".) It reached number 171 on Billboard magazine's Top 200 charts. The commercial growth of the album was hampered by a legal claim: as the album's back cover included a photo of the group on stage with an unauthorized image projected behind them of actor Eric Emerson from a Warhol motion picture, Chelsea Girls, Emerson made a claim of $500,000 ($4,827,844 in 2025 dollars) for use of his image. Instead of compensating Emerson for damages, MGM Records canceled all distribution of the album for nearly two months until the legal problems were settled (by which time the record had lost its modest commercial momentum), and the still was airbrushed out of the remaining copies of the album. By the time the record was re-distributed into stores, it faced stiff competition in the marketplace. The album was re-distributed at nearly the same time as The Beatles' Sgt. Pepper's Lonely Hearts Club Band in June 1967, which further hindered the release. Regarding MGM/Verve's delay in releasing the album, Warhol's business manager Paul Morrissey once offered the following: "Verve/MGM didn't know what to do with The Velvet Underground and Nico because it was so peculiar. They did not release it for almost a year. Tom Wilson at Verve/MGM only bought the album from me because of Nico. He saw no talent in Lou [Reed]." In 1982, Brian Eno said that while the album sold only 30,000 copies in its early years, "everyone who bought one of those 30,000 copies started a band." Filmmaker and music writer Grant McPhee conducted a 2021 investigation into Eno's famous claim into the popularity of the band's first album and concluded that it may have sold as many as 200,000 copies by 1971 alone. Several of the songs from the album, including "Sunday Morning", "Heroin", "All Tomorrow's Parties" and "I'll Be Your Mirror", have been used in various media in television, film, and commercial advertising.

=== White Light/White Heat and Cale's departure (1968) ===
Nico moved on after the Velvets severed their relationship with Andy Warhol. Reed once commented on their leaving Warhol: "He sat down and had a talk with me. 'You gotta decide what you want to do. Do you want to keep just playing museums from now on and the art festivals? Or do you want to start moving into other areas? Lou, don't you think you should think about it?' So I thought about it, and I fired him. Because I thought that was one of the things to do if we were going to move away from that..." Steve Sesnick was soon brought in as a replacement manager, much to the chagrin of Cale, who believes that Sesnick tried to push Reed as band leader at the expense of band harmony. Both Cale and Reed called Sesnick a "snake" in different interviews after leaving the band. In September 1967, the Velvet Underground began recording their second album, White Light/White Heat, with Tom Wilson as producer.

Warhol arranged for the band to get an endorsement deal with Vox to enable them to use Vox equipment, including special effects pedals and an organ, for free. Sterling Morrison believed they were the first American band to get a Vox endorsement.

Sterling Morrison offered the following input regarding the recording:

There was fantastic leakage 'cause everyone was playing so loud and we had so much electronic junk with us in the studio—all these fuzzers and compressors. Gary Kellgren, who is ultra-competent, told us repeatedly: "You can't do it—all the needles are on red." and we reacted as we always reacted: "Look, we don't know what goes on in there and we don't want to hear about it. Just do the best you can." And so the album is fuzzy, there's all that white noise...we wanted to do something electronic and energetic. We had the energy and the electronics, but we didn't know it couldn't be recorded ... what we were trying to do was really fry the tracks.

Cale has said that while the debut had some moments of fragility and beauty, White Light/White Heat was "consciously anti-beauty". The title track sets a harsh opening; bassist Cale overdubbing a piano that has been described as "a cross between Jerry Lee Lewis and Henry Cowell". Along with brash songs like "Sister Ray" and "I Heard Her Call My Name", there was the darkly comic "The Gift", a short story written by Reed and narrated by Cale in his deadpan Welsh accent. The meditative "Here She Comes Now" was later covered by Galaxie 500, Cabaret Voltaire, and Nirvana, among others. The album was released on January 30, 1968, entering the Billboard Top 200 chart for two weeks, at number 199.

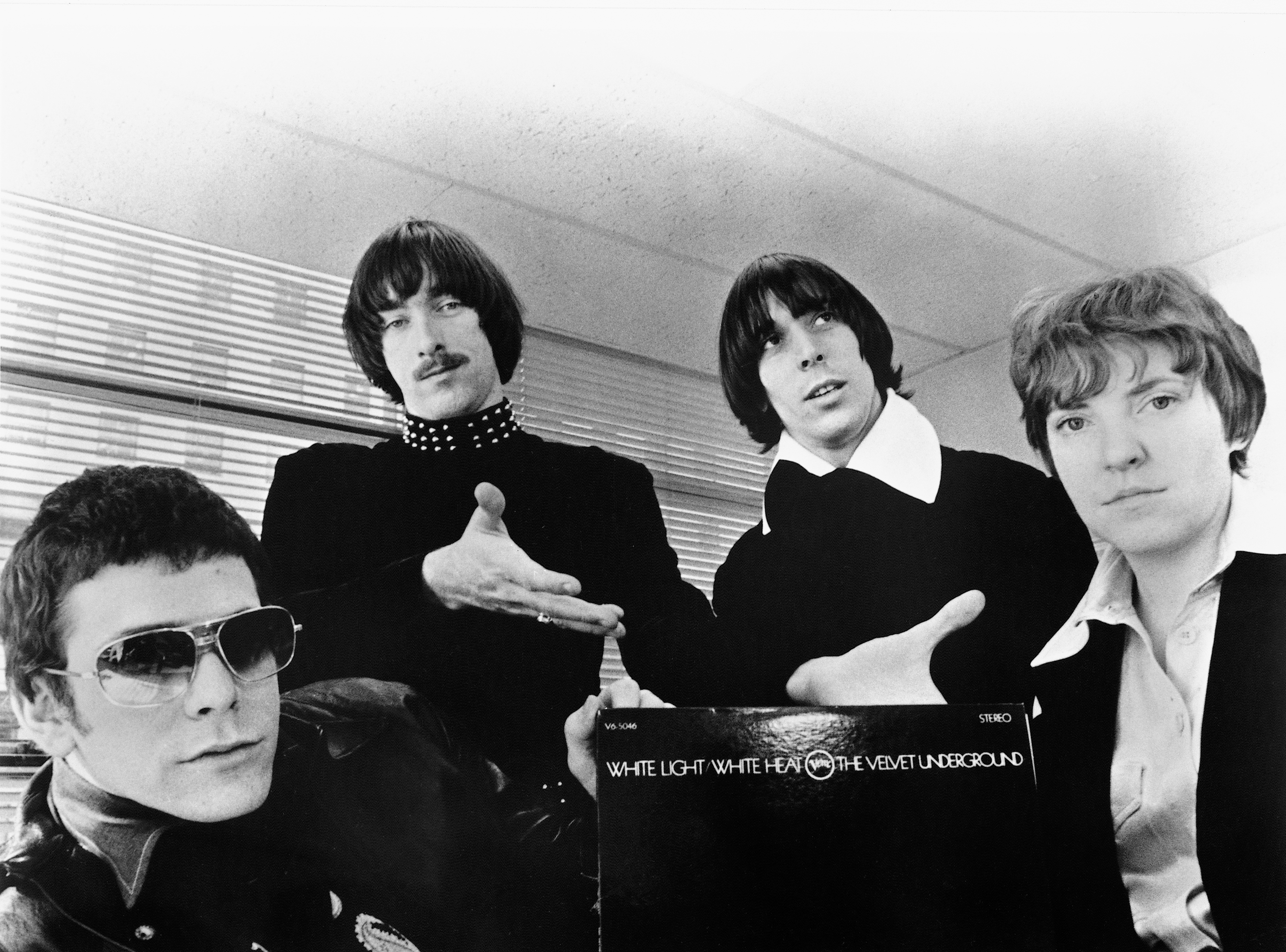
A publicity photo of the band holding a copy of the album, c. 1968.

Tensions were growing: the group was tired of receiving little recognition for its work, and Reed and Cale were pulling the Velvet Underground in different directions. The differences showed in the last recording sessions the band had with John Cale in 1968: three pop-like songs in Reed's direction ("Temptation Inside Your Heart", "Stephanie Says" and "Beginning to See the Light") and a viola-driven drone in Cale's direction ("Hey Mr. Rain"). Further, some songs the band had performed with Cale in concert, or that he had co-written, were not recorded until after he had left the group (such as "Walk It and Talk It", "Ride into the Sun", and "Countess from Hong Kong").

Reed called Morrison and Tucker to a meeting at the Riviera Cafe in the West Village without Cale's knowledge, and informed them that Cale was out of the band; when Morrison objected, Reed said it was either Cale was sacked or the Velvets were dissolved. Neither Morrison nor Tucker was happy with the idea, but faced with a choice of either no Cale or no band at all, the pair reluctantly sided with Reed.

It has often been reported that before Cale's departure (following White Light/White Heat) there was a struggle between his creative impulses and Reed's: Cale's experimentalist tendencies had contrasted with Reed's more conventional approach. According to Tim Mitchell, however, Morrison reported that while there was creative tension between Reed and Cale, its effects have been exaggerated over the years. Cale played his last show with the band at the Boston Tea Party in September 1968 and was fired shortly afterwards.

According to Michael Carlucci, a friend of Robert Quine, "Lou told Quine that the reason why he had to get rid of Cale in the band was Cale's ideas were just too out there. Cale had some wacky ideas. He wanted to record the next album with the amplifiers underwater, and [Lou] just couldn't have it. He was trying to make the band more accessible." Ultimately, Morrison was dispatched by Reed to tell Cale that he was out of the band.

=== Doug Yule joins and The Velvet Underground (1969) ===
Before work on their third album started, Cale was replaced by musician Doug Yule of the Boston group the Grass Menagerie, who had been a close associate of the band. Yule, a native New Yorker, had moved to Boston to attend Boston University as a theater major, but left the program after one year to continue playing music. Yule had first seen the Velvets perform at a student event at Harvard University in Cambridge in early 1968, and when the band played at the Boston Tea Party later that year, the band stayed at Yule's apartment on River Street, which he happened to be renting from their road manager, Hans Onsager (who worked closely with their manager Steve Sesnick). It was during this period that Morrison heard Yule playing guitar in his apartment, and mentioned to Reed that Yule was practicing guitar and was improving quickly. It was following this discussion that led to a phone call from Steve Sesnick inviting Yule to meet with the band at Max's Kansas City in New York City in October 1968 to discuss joining the Velvets before two upcoming shows in Cleveland, Ohio, at the club La Cave. Upon meeting Reed, Sesnick and Morrison at Max's, Yule was asked to handle bass and organ duties in the band, and he would soon contribute vocals as well. After several months of shows in the US, the band swiftly recorded their third album The Velvet Underground in late 1968 at TTG Studios in Hollywood, California. It was released in March 1969. The cover photograph was taken by Billy Name. The LP sleeve was designed by Dick Smith, then a staff artist at MGM/Verve. Released on March 12, 1969, the album failed to make Billboard's Top 200 album chart.

The harsh, abrasive tendencies on the first two records were almost entirely absent on their third album. This resulted in a gentler sound influenced by folk music, prescient of the songwriting style that would soon form Reed's solo career. While Reed had covered a vast range of lyrical subjects on the first two Velvet Underground albums, the lyrical themes of the third album were more "intimate" in nature. Reed's songwriting also covered new emotional ground as well, as heard in the songs "Pale Blue Eyes", "Jesus", "Beginning to See the Light", and "I'm Set Free". The personal tone of the album's subject matter resulted in Reed's desire to create a "closet" mix that boosted the vocals to the forefront, while reducing the album's instrumentation. The second (and more widely distributed) mix is the stereo mix done by MGM/Verve staff recording engineer Val Valentin. Another factor in the change of sound was the band's Vox amplifiers and assorted fuzzboxes were rumored to have been stolen from an airport while they were on tour and they obtained replacements by signing a new endorsement deal with Sunn. In addition, Reed and Morrison had purchased matching Fender 12-string electric guitars, but Doug Yule plays down the influence of the new equipment.

Morrison's ringing guitar parts and Yule's melodic bass guitar and harmony vocals are used prominently on the album. Reed's songs and singing are subdued and confessional in nature, and he shared lead vocals with Yule, particularly when his own voice would fail under stress. Doug Yule sang the lead vocal on "Candy Says" (about the Warhol superstar Candy Darling), which opens the LP, and a rare Moe Tucker lead vocal is used on "After Hours", which closes the album, because Reed felt her "innocent" voice was more believable for a sad song. The album contains the experimental track "The Murder Mystery", which utilized all four band members (Reed, Yule, Tucker and Morrison) reading different lyrics, sometimes simultaneously, as well as the ballad "Pale Blue Eyes".

=== Year on the road and the "lost" fourth album (1969) ===
The Velvet Underground spent much of 1969 on the road both in the US and Canada, and not making much headway commercially. Despite these commercial setbacks, the band focused on performing live shows on the road, playing both re-worked songs from their past albums, and debuting new songs that would find their way onto the Loaded album, such as "New Age", "Rock and Roll", and "Sweet Jane". While the band continued to do extended improvisations in their live shows, by 1969 they were focusing on tight live performances, and several of the live shows the band played during this period would end up released as live albums many years later. The live album 1969: The Velvet Underground Live (with Reed, Yule, Morrison and Tucker) was recorded in October and November 1969 but not released until 1974, on Mercury Records, at the urging of rock critic Paul Nelson, who worked in A&R for Mercury at the time. Nelson asked singer-songwriter Elliott Murphy to write liner notes for the double album. In his notes, Murphy described a scene 100 years in the future, with a student taking a class on "classical rock'n'roll" and listening to the Velvet Underground. He wondered what the student would make of the music and concluded, "I wish it was a hundred years from today (I can't stand the suspense)".

During this period the band played a series of shows in November 1969 at the Matrix and the Family Dog venues in San Francisco; recordings of these shows were released in 2001, as a triple live album, Bootleg Series Volume 1: The Quine Tapes, which included the line up of Reed, Yule, Morrison and Tucker. During 1969 the band recorded on and off in the studio, creating a lot of promising material (both singles and one-offs) that were never officially released at the time due to disputes with their record label. What many consider to be the prime songs of these recording sessions were released years later, in 1985, in an album called VU. The album VU marks the transitional sound between the whisper-soft third album and the band's movement to the later pop rock song-style of their final record, Loaded. Two of the songs the Velvets recorded during this period were later used on film soundtracks: "Stephanie Says" was used in the 2001 film The Royal Tenenbaums; "I'm Sticking With You" has a rare Moe Tucker–Lou Reed dual-lead vocal track, with Doug Yule accompanying on piano, and was included in the film Juno.

The rest of the recordings, as well as some alternative takes and instrumental tracks were later bundled on Another View, an album released in 1986. After Reed's departure, he later reworked a number of these songs for his solo records over the years: "Stephanie Says", "Ocean", "I Can't Stand It", "Lisa Says", and "Andy's Chest", as well as "She's My Best Friend", which had been originally sung by Doug Yule.

=== Break with MGM/Verve ===
By 1969 the MGM and Verve record labels had been losing money for several years. A new president, Mike Curb, was hired and he decided to cancel the recording contracts of 18 of their acts who supposedly glorified drugs in their lyrics, including their many controversial and unprofitable acts. The drug or hippie-related bands were released from MGM; nonetheless MGM insisted on retaining ownership of all master tapes of their recordings and according to an MGM representative in a Rolling Stone article from 1970, "it wasn't eighteen groups, [Curb] was misquoted. The cuts were made partly to do with the drug scene—like maybe a third of them had to do with drug reasons. The others were dropped because they weren't selling." Lou Reed would later remark in the 1987 issue of Creem that while he did not believe that MGM dropped the Velvets for drug associations, he did acknowledge, "We wanted to get out of there."

=== Loaded, Tucker's pregnancy and Max's residency (1970) ===
Cotillion Records (a subsidiary of Atlantic Records that specialized in blues and Southern soul) signed the Velvet Underground for what would be its final studio album with Lou Reed or Sterling Morrison: Loaded. The album's title refers to Atlantic's request that the band produce an album "loaded with hits". Though the record was not the smash hit the company had anticipated, it contains the most accessible pop-rock the Velvet Underground had performed, and two of Reed's best-known songs, "Sweet Jane" and "Rock and Roll".

By the recording of Loaded, Doug Yule played a more prominent role in the band, and with Reed's encouragement, sang the lead vocal on four songs: "Who Loves the Sun", which opened the album, "New Age", "Lonesome Cowboy Bill" and the final track, "Oh! Sweet Nuthin". Yule once commented on the recording of Loaded: "Lou leaned on me a lot in terms of musical support and for harmonies, vocal arrangements. I did a lot on Loaded. It sort of devolved down to the Lou and Doug recreational recording."

While the third Velvets' LP was recorded mostly live in a collaborative atmosphere, the bulk of Loaded was crafted in the studio. In addition to handling all the bass and piano duties on Loaded, Yule also contributed several lead guitar parts and played drums on five of the album's ten tracks (most notably on the songs "Rock and Roll" and "Sweet Jane") since Moe Tucker (who was credited as the album's drummer despite not playing on it) was absent on maternity leave to have her first child, a daughter named Kerry. Other drum parts were performed by engineer Adrian Barber, session musician Tommy Castanaro, and Billy Yule (Doug Yule's younger brother), who was still in high school at the time. During the sessions, Sterling Morrison resumed his undergraduate studies at the City College of New York. Although he contributed guitar tracks to the album, he began to split his time between classes, the sessions and the gigs at Max's, thus leaving Reed and Yule to handle the bulk of the arrangements.

During the Loaded recording sessions, the Velvets (with Billy Yule deputizing on drums) secured a nine-week residency (from June 24 – August 28, 1970) at the New York nightclub Max's Kansas City, playing two lengthy sets per night with altered arrangements of songs from their previous albums and the new material from Loaded. Reed's last live performance with the band at Max's was informally recorded and was released in 1972 as Live at Max's Kansas City, also on Atlantic Records.

=== Reed's departure and release of Loaded (1970) ===
Disillusioned with the lack of progress the band was making, and facing pressure by manager Steve Sesnick, Reed quit the band during the last week of the Max's Kansas City shows in August 1970. Although Reed had informed Tucker, who was attending the show but not playing with the band because of her pregnancy, that he planned to leave the group on his last evening, he did not tell Morrison or Yule. In a 2006 interview, Yule said Sesnick waited until one hour before the band was scheduled to take the stage the following night before notifying him that Reed was not coming. "I was expecting [Lou] to show up, I thought he was late." Yule blamed Sesnick for Reed's departure. "Sesnick had engineered Lou's leaving the group. He and Lou had a relationship where Lou had depended on him for moral support, and he trusted him, and Sesnick basically said 'screw you.' ... It must have been hard for Lou to hear that because he depended on him, so he quit." While Loaded was finalized and mixed, it had yet to be mastered and was not set to be released by Atlantic until November of that year. Reed often said he was completely surprised when he saw Loaded in stores. He also said, "I left them to their album full of hits that I made".

Reed said he was perturbed about a verse being edited from the Loaded version of "Sweet Jane". "New Age" was changed as well: as originally recorded, its closing line ("It's the beginning of a new age" as sung by Yule) was repeated many more times. A brief interlude in "Rock and Roll" was also removed. (For the 1995 box set Peel Slowly and See, the album was presented as Reed intended; the "Fully Loaded" two-disc edition includes the full versions of "Sweet Jane" and "New Age".) On the other hand, Yule has said that the album was for all intents and purposes finished when Reed left the band and that Reed had been aware of most, if not all, of the edits.

=== Live at Max's, Squeeze and final VU shows (1970–1973) ===
With manager Steve Sesnick looking to fill bookings (following the departure of Lou Reed), and with the pending release of Loaded in November 1970, the band, now with Sterling Morrison on guitar, Moe Tucker on drums, Walter Powers on bass, and Doug Yule taking over lead vocals and guitar, played periodic shows to promote the album from November 1970 to August 1971, playing shows around the U.S. By this juncture, Sterling Morrison had received his degree from the City College of New York. Following a show in Houston, Texas, he left the group in August 1971 to pursue a Ph.D. in medieval literature at the University of Texas at Austin. He had packed an empty suitcase and when the time came for the band to return to New York City, he told them at the airport that he was staying in Texas and quitting the band—the last founding member to quit. Morrison's replacement was singer/keyboard player Willie Alexander. This brief line-up of the band played several shows in the US and Canada in September 1971, and in October and November 1971 the band did several shows in England, Wales, and the Netherlands to support the 1971 European release of Loaded, some of which are collected on the 2001 box set Final V.U. After the brief European tour in November 1971 was finished, the lineup of Yule, Tucker, Alexander and Powers disbanded.

In May 1972, Atlantic released Live at Max's Kansas City, the recording of the Velvet Underground's final performance with Reed (also with Doug Yule, Morrison, and Billy Yule) made by a fan, Brigid Polk, on August 23, 1970. Due to publicity around the release, and growing interest in the Velvet Underground in Europe, Sesnick was able to secure a single album deal with Polydor in the UK, and a handful of promotional shows were booked in the UK in November and December 1972. After Sesnick reached out to Yule, a new Velvet Underground lineup was quickly assembled by Yule to do the UK shows. This brief lineup of the Velvet Underground consisted of Yule, guitarist Rob Norris (later of the Bongos), bassist George Kay (Krzyzewski), and drummer Mark Nauseef. After Sesnick failed to show up in London to meet the band with the necessary equipment and tour funds, they played the handful of dates to secure enough money for flights back to the US, and Yule left the band when the tour ended in December 1972. During this brief period in the UK, Yule recorded the Polydor album Squeeze under the Velvet Underground name virtually by himself, with only the assistance of Deep Purple drummer Ian Paice and a few other session musicians in an unspecified London studio. While Yule intended to recruit Moe Tucker to play drums on Squeeze and the handful of promotional shows, Sesnick vetoed his decision and claimed she was "too expensive" to hire. Yule was also prevented by Sesnick from participating in the mixing of the album's tracks.

Squeeze was released in February the following year, 1973, in Europe only, with minimal promotion by the label, and was held in low regard by fans and critics. Stephen Thomas Erlewine notes that the album received "uniformly terrible reviews" upon initial release, and in the early 1970s, the NME Book of Rock counted it as "a Velvet Underground album in name only". When asked about Squeeze, Yule hinted that Sesnick orchestrated the album purely as a money ploy. "Sesnick dumped the second iteration of the band in England with no money and no equipment and just left us there to find our way back. He gave me six copies of Squeeze as pay. I never got any money. When you sign with ASCAP or BMI you get an advance. He not only made an arrangement with them but actually signed as me and took the money."

In later years the album was revisited by both critics and musicians with more favorable reviews. In 2011 music writer Steven Shehori included Squeeze in his "Criminally Overlooked Albums" series for The Huffington Post, and in a lengthy review, offered the following assessment: "if you pluck it from the shackles of its murky back-story, Squeeze is nothing short of a quintessential listening experience." The UK band Squeeze took their name from its title according to band member Chris Difford, who offered the following opinion of the album in a 2012 interview: "It's an odd record, but the name came from that, definitely. ... In a retrospective way I really enjoy it. It has kind of a naivety about it."

Although Yule had put an end to the Velvet Underground in late 1972, a band with him, Billy Yule, George Kay and guitarist Don Silverman (later known as Noor Khan) was billed as the Velvet Underground for two shows in Boston and Long Island. The band members objected to the billing (instigated by their tour manager); according to Yule, the promoter was not supposed to bill the band as the Velvet Underground. In late May 1973, the band and the tour manager parted ways, thus bringing the Velvet Underground to an end until the line-up of Reed, Tucker, Morrison and Cale reunited in the 1990s.

=== Post-VU developments (1972–1990) ===
Reed, Cale and Nico teamed up at the beginning of 1972 to play a concert in Paris at the Bataclan club. This concert was bootlegged, and finally received an official release as Le Bataclan '72 in 2003. Before that, Cale and Nico had developed solo careers, with Cale producing a majority of Nico's albums. Reed started his solo career in 1972 after a brief sabbatical. Sterling Morrison was a professor for some time, teaching Medieval Literature at the University of Texas at Austin, then became a tugboat captain in Houston for several years. Moe Tucker raised a family before returning to small-scale gigging and recording in the 1980s; Morrison was in several touring bands, including Tucker's band.

Yule subsequently toured with Lou Reed and played on the latter's Sally Can't Dance album, and Yule (at Reed's request) also contributed guitar and bass tracks to Reed's album Coney Island Baby, which can be heard in the Bonus Edition of the album (released in 2002). Yule became a member of American Flyer, then dropped out of the music industry altogether before reappearing in the early 2000s.

In 1985, Polydor released the album VU, which collected unreleased recordings that might have constituted the band's fourth album for MGM in 1969 but had never been released. Some of the songs had been recorded when Cale was still in the band. More unreleased recordings of the band, some of them demos and unfinished tracks, were released in 1986 as Another View.

On July 18, 1988, at age 49, Nico died of a cerebral hemorrhage following a bicycle accident in Ibiza, Spain.

Czech dissident playwright Václav Havel was a fan of the Velvet Underground, ultimately becoming a friend of Lou Reed. Though some attribute the name of the 1989 "Velvet Revolution", which ended more than 40 years of Communist rule in Czechoslovakia, to the band, Reed pointed out that the name Velvet Revolution derives from its peaceful nature—that no one was "actually hurt" during those events. Reed has also given at least one radio interview where he stated that it was called the Velvet Revolution because all of the dissidents were listening to the Velvet Underground leading up to the overthrow, and this music was an inspiration for the events that followed. After Havel's election as president, first of Czechoslovakia and then the Czech Republic, Reed visited him in Prague. On September 16, 1998, at Havel's request, Reed performed in the White House at a state dinner in Havel's honor hosted by President Bill Clinton.

=== Reunions and death of Morrison (1990–1996) ===
The Velvet Underground reformed in 1993. From left to right: Morrison (at back), Tucker, Cale and Reed.

In 1990, Reed and Cale released Songs for Drella, a song cycle about Andy Warhol, who had died in 1987. Though Morrison and Tucker had each worked with Reed and Cale since the Velvet Underground had broken up, Songs for Drella was the first time the pair had worked together in decades, and speculation about a reunion began to form, fueled by the one-off appearance by Reed, Cale, Morrison and Tucker to play "Heroin" as the encore to a brief Songs for Drella set in Jouy-en-Josas, France. Lou Reed and Sterling Morrison also joined John Cale for an encore at his show at New York University on December 5, 1992.

The Reed–Cale–Morrison–Tucker lineup officially reunited without Yule (whose inclusion had been championed by Morrison) in 1992, commencing activities with a European tour beginning in Edinburgh on June 1, 1993, and including a performance at Glastonbury which appeared on an NME front cover. Cale sang most of the songs Nico had originally performed. As well as headlining (with Luna as the opening act), the Velvets performed as supporting act for five dates of U2's Zoo TV Tour. With the success of the Velvet Underground's European reunion tour, a series of US tour dates were proposed, as was an MTV Unplugged broadcast, and possibly even some new studio recordings. Before any of this could come to fruition, Cale and Reed fell out again, breaking up the band once more.

On August 30, 1995, Sterling Morrison died of non-Hodgkin lymphoma after returning to his hometown of Poughkeepsie, New York, at age 53. When the classic lineup of the band was inducted into the Rock and Roll Hall of Fame in 1996, Reed, Tucker, and Cale reformed the Velvet Underground for the last time. Doug Yule was not inducted and did not attend. At the ceremony, the band was inducted by Patti Smith, and the trio performed "Last Night I Said Goodbye to My Friend", written in tribute to Morrison.

=== NYPL reunion, death of Reed and Grammys concert (2009–2017) ===
In December 2009, to commemorate the 45th anniversary of the band's formation, Reed, Tucker and Yule (with Cale not present) gave a rare interview at the New York Public Library.

The Velvet Underground continues to exist as a New York–based partnership managing the financial and back catalog aspects for the band members. In January 2012, the surviving members of the band initiated legal action against the Andy Warhol Foundation for the Visual Arts over unauthorized use of the debut album's banana design. Forty-fifth anniversary box sets of the band's first four studio albums, including significantly expanded bonus material, appeared from 2012 to 2015; the live box set The Complete Matrix Tapes, comprising remixed and remastered versions of a series of professionally recorded 1969 performances, also appeared in 2015.

On October 27, 2013, Lou Reed died at his home in Southampton, New York, aged 71. He had undergone a liver transplant earlier in the year. John Cale responded to Reed's passing by saying, "The world has lost a fine songwriter and poet. ... I've lost my 'school-yard buddy'". His death left Cale the sole surviving original member of the band.

In 2017, John Cale and Maureen Tucker reunited to perform "I'm Waiting for the Man" at the Grammy Salute to Music Legends concert.

== Musical style and influences ==
The music of the Velvet Underground has been described as a "boldly uncompromising" fusion of rock & roll, the avant-garde, and the "poetic realism of post-beat literature". AllMusic called the band "the first proto-punk group" for their "boundary-shattering lyrical content, their use of feedback, distortion, and white noise, their unpredictable (yet song-centered) experimentalism, [and] their amateurish technique". Mark Beaumont of The Independent labeled them "enigmatic New York art rockers" whose early releases encompassed styles such as dream pop, drone, and transgressive noise rock, with their later albums exploring "intimate" folk and "radio-friendly choruses". Stuart Rosenberg described them as a "groundbreaking group in experimental rock" whose work was forward-thinking but out of step with their culture. David Rooney of The Hollywood Reporter noted that "the band’s association with the Factory burnished their reputation, landing them gigs at art events and museums even when commercial and critical success for their raw garage sound remained elusive." Michael Leader of Little White Lies called the band "the ultimate cult pop group" whose "heady, dissonant sound" was "completely out of step with the flower-power mainstream of the time".

In their early work, Beaumont noted a tension between the "melodic rock’n’roll focus" of Reed and the "viola tormenting avant-garde leanings of his more experimental foil John Cale". While Cale brought classically-trained ideas and the influence of avant-garde composers John Cage and La Monte Young, the other members were fans of doo-wop, Bo Diddley, and Booker T. & the M.G.s. In addition to rock & roll and his experience writing pop music for Pickwick Records, Reed was also influenced by avant-garde jazz. Following Cale's ouster from the band in 1968, Reed led the band toward a more conventional and restrained rock sound that dispensed with most of the experimental qualities of their first two albums in hopes of reaching commercial success.

== Legacy ==
The Velvet Underground is regarded as one of the most influential bands in rock history. In 1996 they were inducted into the Rock and Roll Hall of Fame. Critic Robert Christgau considers them to be "the number three band of the '60s, after the Beatles and James Brown and His Famous Flames". In 1998, The New York Times contributor David Bowman called them "arguably the most influential American rock band of our time". AllMusic's Richie Unterberger wrote that "Few rock groups can claim to have broken so much new territory, and maintain such consistent brilliance on record, as the Velvet Underground during their brief lifespan [...] the Velvets' innovations – which blended the energy of rock with the sonic adventurism of the avant-garde, and introduced a new degree of social realism and sexual kinkiness into rock lyrics – were too abrasive for the mainstream to handle."

The group was ranked the 19th-greatest artist by Rolling Stone, and the 24th-greatest artist in a poll by VH1. In 2003, Rolling Stone's 500 Greatest Albums of All Time list included The Velvet Underground & Nico at number 13, Loaded at number 109, White Light/White Heat at number 292, and The Velvet Underground at number 314. In 2004, on their 500 Greatest Songs of All Time list, Rolling Stone included "I'm Waiting for the Man" at number 159, "Sweet Jane" at number 335, and "Heroin" at number 448.

The Velvet Underground's songs have been covered by many prominent artists and bands, including David Bowie, Nirvana, Joy Division, Nick Cave, OMD, and Cat Power. Several tribute albums and full-album covers have been made with different artists, including Beck, St. Vincent, Jasper Patrick Leach, and Iggy Pop.

In 2017, the Velvet Underground received the Grammy Lifetime Achievement Award.

In 2021, a documentary film titled The Velvet Underground premiered at the Cannes Film Festival and was released on Apple TV+.

== Band members ==
Classic line-up

- Lou Reed – vocals, guitars (1964–1970, 1990, 1992–1993, 1996; died 2013), piano (1967–1970)
- John Cale – viola, bass guitar, keyboards, vocals (1964–1968, 1990, 1992–1993, 1996)
- Sterling Morrison – guitars, backing vocals (1964–1971, 1990, 1992–1993; died 1995), bass guitar (1965–1970, 1990, 1992–1993)
- Moe Tucker – percussion, drums (1965–1973, 1990, 1992–1993, 1996), vocals (1968–1972, 1990, 1992–1993, 1996), bass guitar (one off 1966)

Former members

- Angus MacLise – percussion (1964–1965; died 1979), drums (1966)
- Doug Yule – vocals (1968–1973), guitar (1970–1973), bass guitar (1968–1970, 1972–1973), keyboards (1968–1973)
- Billy Yule – drums, percussion (1970, (Note: Covered for Moe Tucker on maternity leave) 1973)
- Walter Powers – bass guitar, backing vocals (1970–1972; died 2026)
- Willie Alexander – keyboards, vocals (1971–1972)

== Discography ==
- The Velvet Underground & Nico (1967)
- White Light/White Heat (1968)
- The Velvet Underground (1969)
- Loaded (1970)
- Squeeze (1973)

== Tours ==
- NYC Village (Mar 1965 – Mar 1966)
- Exploding Plastic Inevitable (Apr 1966 – May 1967)
- US Tour (Jun–Dec 1967)
- White Light/White Heat Tour (Feb 1968 – Feb 1969)
- The Velvet Underground Tour (Mar 1969 – May 1970)
- Unicorn Coffee House Residency (May–Jun 1970)
- Max's Kansas City Residency (Jun–Aug 1970)
- Loaded Tour (Doug Yule) (Nov 1970 – Nov 1972)
- Squeeze Tour (Doug Yule) (Dec 1972 – May 1973)
- MCMXCIII European Reunion Tour (Jun–Jul 1993)

== Filmography ==
| Year | Film | Director | Notes |
|---|---|---|---|
| 1965 | Venus in Furs | Piero Heliczer | 5 minutes |
| 1965 | Gerard Malanga's Film Notebooks | Gerard Malanga | 27 minutes |
| 1966 | The Velvet Underground Eat Lunch | Danny Williams | short film |
| 1966 | Sunday Morning | Rosalind Stevenson | 5 minutes |
| 1966 | Chelsea Girls | Andy Warhol/Paul Morrissey | composers |
| 1966 | The Velvet Underground a.k.a. Moe in Bondage/Moe Gets Tied Up | Andy Warhol | 66 minutes |
| 1966 | The Velvet Underground and Nico: A Symphony of Sound | Andy Warhol | 70 minutes |
| 1966 | The Velvet Underground Tarot Cards | Andy Warhol | 65 minutes |
| 1966 | The Velvet Underground: Psychiatrist's Convention, NYC, 1966 | Andy Warhol | 7 minutes |
| 1967 | The Velvet Underground in Boston | Andy Warhol | 33 minutes |
| 1967 | Exploding Plastic Inevitable | Ronald Nameth | 22 minutes |
| 1969 | Walden (Diaries, Notes and Sketches) | Jonas Mekas | |
| 1972 | The Velvet Underground at Le Bataclan '72 | Claude Ventura | |
| 1986 | The South Bank Show | Kim Evans | episode: "The Velvet Underground" |
| 1993 | Velvet Underground: Velvet Redux Live MCMXCIII | Declan Lowney | |
| 1994 | Curious: The Velvet Underground in Europe | Declan Lowney | |
| 1995 | Nico Icon | Susanne Ofteringer | |
| 1995 | Rock & Roll | David Espar | |
| 1996 | Rock and Roll Hall of Fame Induction Ceremony | | |
| 1997 | Arena: The Banana | Kate Meynell | |
| 1998 | American Masters | Timothy Greenfield-Sanders | episode: "Lou Reed: Rock and Roll Heart" |
| 2001 | Andy Warhol: The Complete Picture | Chris Rodley | |
| 2005 | Punk: Attitude | Don Letts | |
| 2006 | Musikbyrån | | episode: "New York" |
| 2007 | A Walk Into the Sea: Danny Williams and the Warhol Factory | Esther Robinson | |
| 2007 | Seven Ages of Rock | Francis Whately and Alastair Laurence | Two episodes: "White Light, White Heat: Art Rock" and "Blank Generation: Punk Rock" |
| 2021 | The Velvet Underground | Todd Haynes | |

== See also ==
- The Boston Tea Party (concert venue)
