= List of songs recorded by the Velvet Underground =

The following is a list of all songs by the Velvet Underground, excluding those after the departure of Lou Reed on the Squeeze album and the reunion tour. This list details the name of the song and any officially released recordings of the song. In the case of studio recordings, the album title and date of album release have been included. In the case of live recordings, demos or rehearsal recordings, the date of recording and album the track appears on have been included.

The songs, in alphabetical order, are as follows:

Contents:	Top – A B C E F G H I J L M N O P R S T V W Unreleased songs / See also / References

== A ==
Song title	Released recordings	Notes
"After Hours"	Studio recording: The Velvet Underground (1969); Live recordings: November 8, 1969 (The Quine Tapes); August 23, 1970 (Live at Max's Kansas City)	
"All Tomorrow's Parties"	Studio recordings: The Velvet Underground & Nico (1967); The Velvet Underground & Nico (1967) [alternate CD mix]; Peel Slowly and See (1995) [single version]; Demo/rehearsal recordings: July 1965 (Peel Slowly and See)	Released as a single in 1966 with "I'll Be Your Mirror".
"Andy's Chest"	Studio recording: VU (1985)	Lou Reed recovered it on the album Transformer

== B ==
Song title	Released recordings	Notes
"Beginning to See the Light"	Studio recording: The Velvet Underground (1969); Live recordings: November 12 – December 3, 1969 (1969); July 26, 1970 (Live at Max's Kansas City)	
"The Black Angel's Death Song"	Studio recording: The Velvet Underground & Nico (1967); Live recording: November 23, 1969 (The Quine Tapes)	
"Booker T"	Live recording: April 30, 1967 (Peel Slowly and See)	

== C ==
Song title	Released recordings	Notes
"Candy Says"	Studio recording: The Velvet Underground (1969); Live recording: August 23, 1970 (Live at Max's Kansas City, deluxe edition)	
"Chelsea Girls"	Studio recording: Chelsea Girl (1967)	Written by Lou Reed and Sterling Morrison, performed by Nico, Reed and Morrison.
"Coney Island Steeplechase"	Studio recording: Another View (1986)	
"Cool It Down"	Studio recording: Loaded (1970); Fully Loaded (1997) [early version]	
"Countess from Hong Kong"	Demo/rehearsal recording: Fall 1969 (Peel Slowly and See)	

== E ==
Song title	Released recordings	Notes
"European Son (to Delmore Schwartz)"	Studio recording: The Velvet Underground & Nico (1967)	

== F ==
Song title	Released recordings	Notes
"Femme Fatale"	Studio recording: The Velvet Underground & Nico (1967); Live recordings: October 16, 1969 (1969); November 7, 1969 (The Quine Tapes); August 23, 1970 (Live at Max's Kansas City)	Released as the b-side to "Sunday Morning" in 1966.
"Ferryboat Bill"	Studio recording: Another View (1986)	
"Foggy Notion"	Studio recording: VU (1985); Live recording: November 8, 1969 (The Quine Tapes)	
"Follow the Leader"	Live recording: November 27, 1969 (The Quine Tapes)	

== G ==
Song title	Released recordings	Notes
"The Gift"	Studio recording: White Light/White Heat (1968)	
"Guess I'm Falling in Love"	Studio recording: Another View (1986) [instrumental; outtake]; White Light/White Heat (45th Anniversary Deluxe Edition) (2013) [instrumental; outtake; new mix]; Live recording: April 30, 1967 (Peel Slowly and See)	

== H ==
Song title	Released recordings	Notes
"Head Held High"	Studio recordings: Loaded (1970); Fully Loaded (1997) [alternative mix]; Fully Loaded (1997) [early version]	
"Here She Comes Now"	Studio recording: White Light/White Heat (1968); Demo/rehearsal recording: Winter 1967 (Peel Slowly and See)	
"Heroin"	Studio recording: The Velvet Underground & Nico (1967); Demo/rehearsal recording: July 1965 (Peel Slowly and See); Live recordings: November 12 – December 3, 1969 (1969/1969 CD edition); November 23, 1969 (The Quine Tapes)	
"Hey Mr. Rain"	Studio recording: Another View (1986) [two takes]	

== I ==
Song title	Released recordings	Notes
"I Can't Stand It"	Studio recordings: VU (1985); Live recordings: November 12 – December 3, 1969 (1969); November 8, 1969 (The Quine Tapes)	Lou Reed recovered it on his debut solo album Lou Reed
"I Found a Reason"	Studio recording: Loaded (1970); Demo/rehearsal recording: Fall 1969 (Fully Loaded)	
"I Heard Her Call My Name"	Studio recording: White Light/White Heat (1968)	
"I'll Be Your Mirror"	Studio recording: The Velvet Underground & Nico (1967)	
"I Love You"	Studio recording: Fully Loaded (1997); Demo/rehearsal recording: April 16, 1970 (Peel Slowly and See)	
"I'm Gonna Move Right In"	Studio recording: Another View (1986)	
"I'm Not A Young Man Anymore"	Live recording: April 30, 1967 (White Light/White Heat 45th Anniversary Deluxe Edition)	Performed at the Gymnasium, New York
"I'm Not Too Sorry (Now That You're Gone)"	Demo/rehearsal recording: Winter 1967 (Peel Slowly and See)	
"I'm Set Free"	Studio recording: The Velvet Underground (1969); Live recording: July 26, 1970 (Live at Max's Kansas City, deluxe edition)	
"I'm Sticking With You"	Studio recording: VU (1985); Fully Loaded (1997); Live recording: November 8, 1969 (The Quine Tapes)	
"I'm Waiting for the Man"	Studio recording: The Velvet Underground & Nico (1967); Demo/rehearsal recording: July 1965 (Peel Slowly and See); Live recording: October 19, 1969 (1969); November 8, 1969 (The Quine Tapes); November 27, 1969 (The Quine Tapes); July 26, 1970 (Live at Max's Kansas City)	
"It's Alright (The Way That You Live)"	Demo/rehearsal recording: Winter 1967 (Peel Slowly and See)	
"It's Just Too Much"	Live recordings: October 19, 1969 (Peel Slowly and See; What Goes On); November 12 – December 3, 1969 (1969); November 8, 1969 (The Quine Tapes)	
"It Was a Pleasure Then"	Studio recordings: Chelsea Girl (1967)	Written and performed by Nico, Lou Reed and John Cale.

== J ==
Song title	Released recordings	Notes
"Jesus"	Studio recordings: The Velvet Underground (1969)	

== L ==
Song title	Released recordings	Notes
"Lady Godiva's Operation"	Studio recordings: White Light/White Heat (1968)	
"Lisa Says"	Studio recordings: VU (1985); Live recordings: November 12 – December 3, 1969 (1969)	Lou Reed recovered it on his debut solo album Lou Reed
"Little Sister"	Studio recordings: Chelsea Girl (1967)	Written by John Cale and Lou Reed, performed by Nico, Reed and Cale.
"Lonesome Cowboy Bill"	Studio recordings: Loaded (1970); Fully Loaded (1997) [early version]; Live recordings: July 26, 1970 (Live at Max's Kansas City); August 23, 1970 (Live at Max's Kansas City, deluxe edition)	
"Loop"	Studio recordings: Aspen #3 (1966)	Released on a flexidisc split with "White Wind" by Peter Walker for issue #3 of Aspen magazine (designed by Andy Warhol). Credited to The Velvet Underground, but in reality a solo effort by John Cale.
"Love Makes You Feel Ten Feet Tall"	Demo/rehearsal recording: (Fully Loaded)	

== M ==
Song title	Released recordings	Notes
"Melody Laughter"	Live recordings: November 4, 1966 (Peel Slowly and See, [edit]) (What Goes On, [alternate edit])	
"Miss Joanie Lee"	Demo/rehearsal recordings: January 3, 1966 (The Velvet Underground & Nico, 45th Anniversary Super Deluxe edition)	Was planned for release on the deluxe 2-disc CD edition of The Velvet Underground & Nico but was pulled at the last minute. Eventually released on the 45th Anniversary edition.
"The Murder Mystery"	Studio recordings: The Velvet Underground	

== N ==
Song title	Released recordings	Notes
"New Age"	Studio recordings: Loaded (1970) [edit]; Peel Slowly and See (1995) [long version]; Fully Loaded (1997) [full version]	
"Noise"	Studio recordings: East Village Other	Released in 1966 as part of the "first electric newspaper" by the East Village Other, a collage of sounds which involved many contributors including Ingrid Superstar, Allen Ginsberg, Ed Sanders, Andy Warhol, and the Velvet Underground.

== O ==
Song title	Released recordings	Notes
"Ocean"	Studio recordings: VU (1985); Fully Loaded (1997); Demo/rehearsal recordings: April 16, 1970 (Fully Loaded); Live recordings: November 12 – December 3, 1969 (1969)	Lou Reed recovered it on his debut solo album Lou Reed
"Oh Gin"	Demo/rehearsal recordings: April 16, 1970 (Peel Slowly and See)	
"Oh! Sweet Nuthin'"	Studio recordings: Loaded (1970); Fully Loaded (1997) [early version]	
"One of These Days"	Studio recordings: VU (1985)	
"Over You"	Live Recordings: The Complete Matrix Tapes (1969)	

== P ==
Song title	Released recordings	Notes
"Pale Blue Eyes"	Studio recordings: The Velvet Underground (1969); Live recordings: October 19, 1969 (1969); August 23, 1970 (Live at Max's Kansas City)	
"Prominent Men"	Demo/rehearsal recordings: July 1965 (Peel Slowly and See)	

== R ==
Song title	Released recordings	Notes
"Ride into the Sun"	Studio recordings: Another View (1986) [backing track]; Demo/rehearsal recordings: Fall 1969 (What Goes On); April 16, 1970 (Peel Slowly and See)	Lou Reed recovered it on his debut solo album Lou Reed
"Rock and Roll"	Studio recordings: Another View (1986) [1969 version]; Loaded (1970); Fully Loaded (1997) [alternate mix]; Demo/rehearsal recordings: April 15, 1970 (Fully Loaded); Live recordings: November 25, 1969 (1969) (The Quine Tapes)	On November 25, 1969, "Rock and Roll" was recorded by two separate groups. The first recording would appear on 1969 while Robert Quine's recording would later appear on The Quine Tapes.
"Run Run Run"	Studio recordings: The Velvet Underground & Nico (1967)	

== S ==
Song title	Released recordings	Notes
"Sad Song"	Demo/rehearsal recordings: April 16, 1970 (Peel Slowly and See)	Lou Reed recovered it on his solo album Berlin
"Satellite of Love"	Demo/rehearsal recordings: April 15, 1970 (Peel Slowly and See); April 15, 1970 (Fully Loaded)	Lou Reed recovered it on his solo album Transformer
"Sheltered Life"	Demo/rehearsal recordings: Winter 1967 (Peel Slowly and See)	
"She's My Best Friend"	Studio recordings: VU (1985)	Lou Reed recovered it on the album Coney Island Baby
"She'll Make You Cry"	Studio recordings: [Squeeze/Doug Yule] (1972)	
"Sister Ray"	Studio recording: White Light/White Heat (1968); Live recordings: November 11, 1969 (The Quine Tapes); November 7, 1969 (The Quine Tapes); December 3, 1969 (The Quine Tapes)	
"Some Kinda Love"	Studio recording: The Velvet Underground (1969); Live recordings: November 8, 1969 (The Quine Tapes); November 12 – December 3, 1969 (1969); August 23, 1970 (Peel Slowly and See)	
"Stephanie Says"	Studio recording: VU (1985)	Lou Reed recovered it on the album Berlin with a different title, "Caroline Says II"
"Sunday Morning"	Studio recording: The Velvet Underground & Nico (1967); Live recordings: November 9, 1969 (The Quine Tapes); August 23, 1970 (Live at Max's Kansas City)	
"Sweet Bonnie Brown"	Live recording: November 12 – December 3, 1969 (1969)	
"Sweet Jane"	Studio recordings: Loaded (1970) [edit]; Peel Slowly and See (1995) [full version]; Fully Loaded (1997) [early version]; Live recordings: November 12 – December 3, 1969 (1969); July 26, 1970 (Live at Max's Kansas City, deluxe edition); August 23, 1970 (Live at Max's Kansas City)	

== T ==
Song title	Released recordings	Notes
"Temptation Inside Your Heart"	Studio recording: VU	
"That's the Story of My Life"	Studio recording: The Velvet Underground (1968)	
"There Is No Reason"	Demo/rehearsal recording: Winter 1967 (Peel Slowly and See)	
"There She Goes Again"	Studio recording: The Velvet Underground & Nico (1967)	
"Train Round the Bend"	Studio recording: Loaded (1970); Fully Loaded (1997)	

== V ==
Song title	Released recordings	Notes
"Venus in Furs"	Studio recording: The Velvet Underground & Nico (1967); Demo/rehearsal recording: July 1965 (Peel Slowly and See); Live recordings: December 1, 1969 (The Quine Tapes)	

== W ==
Song title	Released recordings	Notes
"Walk Alone"	Demo/rehearsal recordings: January 3, 1966 (The Velvet Underground & Nico, 45th Anniversary Super Deluxe edition)	Available at the Andy Warhol Museum
"Walk and Talk (It)"	Demo/rehearsal recordings: April 16, 1970 (Peel Slowly and See) (Fully Loaded)	
"We're Gonna Have a Real Good Time Together"	Studio recording: Another View (1986); Live recording: November 12 – December 3, 1969 (1969)	Lou Reed recovered it on his solo album Street Hassle
"What Goes On"	Studio recording: The Velvet Underground (1969); Live recording: November 12 – December 3, 1969 (1969); October 4–6, 1968 (Peel Slowly and See); November 8, 1969 (The Quine Tapes)	
"White Light/White Heat"	Studio recording: White Light/White Heat (1968); Live recording: November 12 – December 3, 1969 (1969); December 1, 1969 (The Quine Tapes); July 26, 1970 (Live at Max's Kansas City, deluxe edition)	
"Who Loves the Sun"	Studio recording: Loaded (1970); Fully Loaded (1997) [alternate mix]; Live recording: August 23, 1970 (Live at Max's Kansas City, deluxe edition)	
"Winter Song"	Studio recording: Chelsea Girl (1967)	Written by John Cale, performed by Nico and Cale.
"Wrap Your Trouble in Dreams"	Studio recording: Chelsea Girl (1967); Demo/rehearsal recording: July 1965 (Peel Slowly and See)	

== Unreleased songs ==
Song title	Recordings/performances	Notes
"A Short Lived Torture Of Cacophony"	Live performances: 1966	Actually just a part of Columbus '66 "Melody Laughter" recorded backwards.
"A Symphony of Sound"	Demo/rehearsal recording: January 1966	Film Soundtrack
"Blue Velvet Jazz Jam"	Demo/rehearsal recording: October, 1969	Performed at End Cole Ave, Dallas
"Blues Instrumental"	Demo/rehearsal recording: January 3, 1966	Available at the Andy Warhol Museum
"Chic Mystique"	Demo/rehearsal recording: January 1966	Performed at the Delmonico's Hotel, New York
"Crackin' Up"	Demo/rehearsal recording: January 3, 1966	Available at the Andy Warhol Museum
"Day Tripper Intro To Boom Boom Boom Instrumental"	Demo/rehearsal recording: January 3, 1966	Available at the Andy Warhol Museum
"Diaries Notes and Sketches"	Demo/rehearsal recording: April 1966	Film Soundtrack
"Get It On Time"	Demo/rehearsal recording: March 1966	Performed at the Factory
"Green Onions"	Demo/rehearsal recording: January 3, 1966	Available at the Andy Warhol Museum
"I'll Keep It With Mine"	Demo/rehearsal recording: February 1966	Performed at the Uptight, Cinematheque, New York
"I'm Free"	Demo/rehearsal recording: 1967–68	Studio Session
"Instrumental Jam"	Demo/rehearsal recording: April 1966	Performed at the Dom, New York
"Last Night I Said Goodbye to My Friend"	Demo/rehearsal recording: 1996	Rock and Roll Hall of Fame induction ceremony
"Lucy Brown"	Demo/rehearsal recording: 1970	Appears on a set-list during the Doug Yule era
"Move right in"	Live performances: October 2, 1968, La Cave, Cleveland	Performed at The Valley Dale Ballroom, Columbus, OH
"Never Get Emotionally Involved With a Man, Woman, Beast, or Child"	Demo/rehearsal performance: Summer 1965	Sterling Morrison mentioned this song among a number of songs written/recorded during the summer of 1965 at the band's loft in Ludlow Street. Maureen Tucker has confirmed the song's existence.
"Noise part 1 & 2"	Demo/rehearsal recording: March 1966	Film soundtrack performed at the Factory
"Nothing Song"	Live performances: November 4, 1966	Performed at The Valley Dale Ballroom, Columbus, OH
"Rockabilly Instrumental"	Demo/rehearsal recording: January 3, 1966	Available at the Andy Warhol Museum
"Rhythm & Blues Instrumental"	Demo/rehearsal recording: January 3, 1966	Available at the Andy Warhol Museum
"Sweet Rock & Roll" aka "Sister Ray, Part Two" and "Sweet Sister Ray"	Live performances: April 1968	A performance of the song in July 1968 in San Diego at The Hippodrome is mentioned in the article "Dead Lie the Velvets, Underground" by Lester Bangs. The refrain to the song is reportedly: "sweet rock and roll, it'll cleanse your soul". Sterling Morrison also contends that the song was a "preamble" to "Sister Ray".
"Wild Child"	Demo/rehearsal recording: July 1970	Performed at the rehearsal for Live at Max's Kansas City.

== See also ==
- The Velvet Underground discography
