= The Velvet Underground discography =

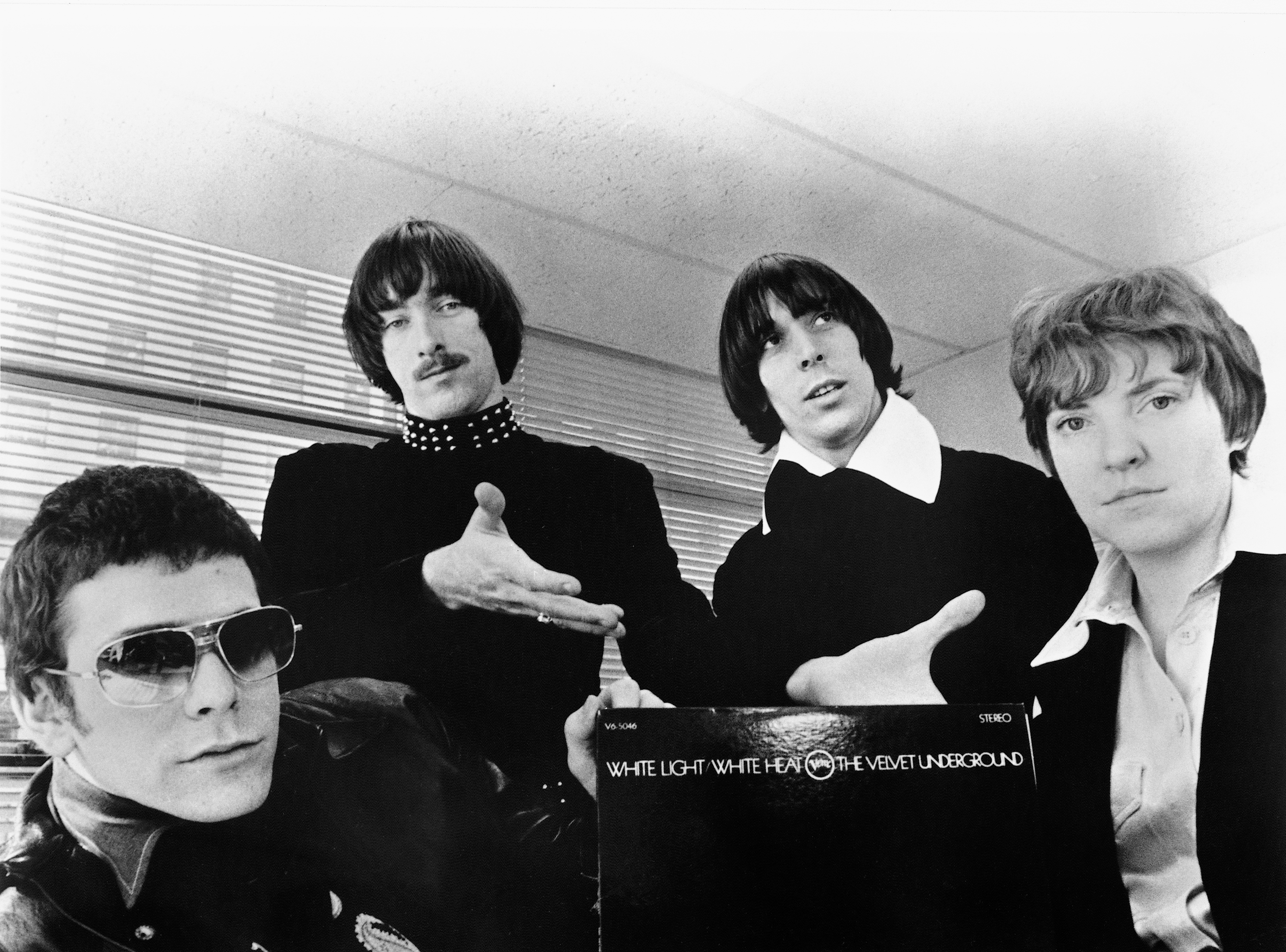
- Studio albums: 5
- Live albums: 6
- Compilation albums: 15
- Singles: 11
- Video albums: 6
- Music videos: 8
- Box sets: 7

The discography of the American rock band the Velvet Underground consists of five studio albums, six live albums, fifteen compilation albums, seven box sets, eight music videos, six video albums and eleven singles.

The first line-up was formed in New York City consisting of Lou Reed on vocals and guitar, John Cale on several instruments (viola, keyboards and bass), Sterling Morrison on guitar and bass and Angus MacLise on percussion (replaced by Maureen Tucker in November 1965). In March 1967, they released their debut album The Velvet Underground & Nico featuring German singer Nico. The album charted in the United States and originally peaked at number 171 on the Billboard album charts and produced two singles, "All Tomorrow's Parties" and "Sunday Morning", which did not chart anywhere. The album, produced by artist Andy Warhol, recharted in 2013 peaking at number 129.

VU released their second studio album White Light/White Heat, which peaked at number 199 of the Billboard charts. The album was more experimental than their first album, featuring a loud and aggressive musical style. The album was produced without Warhol and Nico for the first time. In March 1969 they released the third studio album The Velvet Underground, their first project with Cale's replacement Doug Yule. It did not chart upon its original release. However, when reissued in 1985 it peaked at number 197 in the Billboard chart. One year later, Loaded was released by Atlantic Records, the first time by a major label. Compared with VU first releases, Loaded was produced for the mainstream, without thematizing sex and drugs. Although the songs were successful and popular in several music radios, neither singles, nor the album itself peaked in any music chart. It was the last album featuring Lou Reed, the last remaining founder of VU. After his departure, Yule became the new frontman of the Velvet Underground and toured together with Willie Alexander (keyboard), Walter Powers (bass guitar), Maureen Tucker (drums) and other musicians. In 1973, he recorded their fifth and last regular studio album, Squeeze, which for some time dropped out of the official discography. After their break-off, several compilation albums were released, some of which feature outtakes from their previous studio sessions, most notably VU, which peaked at number 85 on Billboard and 47 on the UK Albums Chart.

== Albums ==
=== Studio albums ===
Year	Album details	Peak chart positions						Certifications
Year	Album details	US	FRA	GER	NLD	NOR	UK	Certifications
1967	The Velvet Underground & Nico: Released: March 1967; Label: Verve; Format: CD, CS, LP	129^{[A]}	164	89	58	40	43^{[A]}	BPI: Platinum; FIMI: Platinum
1968	White Light/White Heat: Released: January 30, 1968; Label: Verve; Format: CD, CS, LP	199	—	—	—	—	—	BPI: Silver
1969	The Velvet Underground: Released: March 1969; Label: Verve; Format: CD, CS, LP	197^{[B]}	—	—	—	—	—	BPI: Gold
1970	Loaded: Released: November 1970; Label: Atlantic; Format: CD, CS, LP	—^{[C]}	188	—	—	—	—	BPI: Silver
1973	Squeeze: Released: February 1973; Label: Polydor; Format: LP	—	—	—	—	—	—	
"—" denotes releases that did not chart.

Notes

- A Upon its release in 1967 the album peaked in the US at 171. Shortly after the death of Lou Reed in 2013 it recharted for one week and peaked at 129.
  Likewise in the UK, where the album did not chart until 1994 when it reached 59, it recharted at 43 shortly after Reed's death in 2013.
- B The album did not chart in its original release in 1969, but did chart on its reissue in 1985 when it peaked at 197.
- C The album appeared at number two on Billboard's Bubbling Under the Top LPs chart for the week of January 30, 1971.

=== Live albums ===
Year	Album details	Peak chart positions		
Year	Album details	US	NZ	UK
1972	Live at Max's Kansas City: Released: May 30, 1972; Label: Cotillion; Format: CD, CS, LP	—	—	—
1974	1969: The Velvet Underground Live: Released: September 1974; Label: Mercury; Format: CD, LP	—	31	—
1993	Live MCMXCIII: Released: October 26, 1993; Label: Warner Bros.; Format: CD, CS	180	—	70
2001	Final V.U. 1971–1973: Released: August 2001; Label: Captain Trip; Format: CD	—	—	—
2001	The Quine Tapes: Released: October 16, 2001; Label: Polydor; Format: CD	—	—	—
2015	The Complete Matrix Tapes: Released: November 20, 2015; Label: Polydor; Format: CD	—	—	—
"—" denotes releases that did not chart.

=== Compilations ===
Year	Album details	Peak chart positions				Certifications
Year	Album details	US	NZ	NOR	UK	Certifications
1970	Velvet Underground: Released: 1970; Label: MGM GAS-131; Format: LP	—	—	—	—	
1971	Andy Warhol's Velvet Underground featuring Nico: Released: 1971; Label: MGM; Format: LP	—	—	—	—	
1985	VU: Released: February 1985; Label: Verve; Format: CD, LP	85	16	—	47	
1986	Another View: Released: September 1986; Label: Verve; Format: CD, CS, LP	—	—	—	—	
1989	The Best of The Velvet Underground: Words and Music of Lou Reed: Released: October 1989; Label: Verve; Format: CD, CS, LP	—	—	—	—	BPI: Silver
1991	Chronicles: Released: 1991; Label: Mercury; Format: CD, CS, LP	—	—	—	—	
1995	The Best of Lou Reed & The Velvet Underground: Released: 1995; Label: Global Rad; Format: CD, CS, LP	—	—	—	56	BPI: Gold
1997	Loaded (Fully Loaded Edition): Released: February 18, 1997; Label: Rhino; Format: CD	—	—	—	—	
2000	20th Century Masters – The Millennium Collection: The Best of The Velvet Underground: Released: October 2000; Label: Polydor; Format: CD	—	—	—	—	
2001	Rock and Roll: An Introduction to The Velvet Underground: Released: July 2, 2001; Label: Polydor; Format: CD	—	—	—	—	
2002	The Velvet Underground & Nico (Deluxe Edition): Released: June 25, 2002; Label: Verve; Format: CD, LP	—	—	40^{[D]}	59^{[D]}	
2003	The Very Best of the Velvet Underground: Released: March 31, 2003; Label: Polydor; Format: CD	—	—	—	—	BPI: Silver
2005	Gold: Released: June 14, 2005; Label: Polydor; Format: CD	—	—	—	—	
2008	Playlist Plus: Released: April 29, 2008; Label: Polydor; Format: CD	—	—	—	—	
2021	The Velvet Underground: Music From the Motion Picture Soundtrack: Released: October 15, 2021; Label: Republic/UMe; Format: CD, LP, digital	—	—	—	10	
"—" denotes releases that did not chart.

Notes

- D 2002 reissue

=== Box sets ===
Year	Album details
1993	What Goes On: Released: 1993; Label: Raven; Format: CD
1995	Peel Slowly and See: Released: September 26, 1995; Label: Polydor; Format: CD
2001	Final V.U.: Released: 2001; Label: Captain Trip Records; Format: CD
2012	The Velvet Underground & Nico 45th Anniversary: Released: October 1, 2012; Label: Polydor; Format: CD
2013	White Light/White Heat 45th Anniversary: Released: December 3, 2013; Label: Polydor; Format: CD
2014	The Velvet Underground 45th Anniversary: Released: November 24, 2014; Label: Polydor; Format: CD
2015	Loaded 45th Anniversary: Released: October 30, 2015; Label: Rhino/Atlantic; Format: CD

== Singles ==
Year	Song (A-side and B-side)	Album	Ref(s)
1966	"All Tomorrow's Parties" (edit) b/w "I'll Be Your Mirror"	The Velvet Underground & Nico	
1966	"Sunday Morning" b/w "Femme Fatale" (FRA #174)	The Velvet Underground & Nico	
1968	"White Light/White Heat" b/w "Here She Comes Now"	White Light/White Heat	
1968	"I Heard Her Call My Name" b/w "Here She Comes Now"	White Light/White Heat	
1969	"What Goes On" (edit) b/w "Jesus" (radio-only single - mono versions)	The Velvet Underground	
1969	"The Velvet Underground" (radio ad distributed to radio stations with excerpts from The Velvet Underground)	The Velvet Underground	
1971	"Who Loves the Sun" b/w "Oh! Sweet Nuthin'"	Loaded	
1971	"Who Loves the Sun (mono)" b/w "Who Loves the Sun (stereo)"	Loaded	
1971	"Who Loves the Sun" b/w "Sweet Jane" (UK-only release)	Loaded	
1973	"Sweet Jane"/"Rock and Roll"	Loaded	
1973	"I'm Waiting for the Man" b/w "Run Run Run" b/w "Candy Says" (UK-only release)	Loaded	
1973	"I'm Waiting for the Man" b/w "Candy Says" b/w "White Light/White Heat" (NLD-only release)	Loaded	
1985	"Foggy Notion" (edit) b/w "I Can't Stand It" (promo)	VU	
1988	"I'm Waiting for the Man" b/w "Heroin" (UK-only release)	Non-album singles	
1988	"Venus in Furs" b/w "All Tomorrow Parties" (UK-only release)	Non-album singles	
1993	"I'm Waiting for the Man" b/w "Pale Blue Eyes" b/w "White Light/White Heat" b/w "Sweet Jane" (UK-only release, promo)	Non-album singles	
1993	"Venus in Furs" b/w "I'm Waiting for the Man" (FRA-only release)	Live MCMXCIII	
1994	"Venus in Furs" (live edit) b/w "Sweet Jane" (Live), "Heroin" (Live), "I'm Waiting for the Man" (Live) (UK #71)	Non-album singles	
2009	"We're Gonna Have a Real Good Time Together" b/w "If You Close the Door (After Hours)"	Non-album singles	

== Videography ==
=== Video albums ===
Year	Video details
1966	The Velvet Underground and Nico: A Symphony of Sound: Distributor: Andy Warhol Films/RaroVideo/Coleophoric Pictures Ltd.; Format: Theatrical / DVD (2004, 2011)
1967	Exploding Plastic Inevitable: Distributor: Andy Warhol Films/Coleophoric Pictures Ltd.; Format: Theatrical / DVD (2011)
1972	Le Bataclan '72: Distributor: ORTF/INA Films/Grey Scale; Format: Broadcast (Pop2) / CD+DVD (2017) / streaming
1993	Velvet Redux Live MCMXCIII: Distributor: Warner Music Vision/Rhino Home Video; Format: VHS/laserdisc / DVD (2006, 2009)
1994	Curious: A Documentary: Distributor: VAP, Inc.; Format: VHS/laserdisc
2021	The Velvet Underground: Distributor: Apple TV/The Criterion Collection; Format: Theatrical / Blu-ray/DVD/streaming (2022)

=== Music videos ===
Year	Title	Director	Ref.
1966	"Sunday Morning"	Rosalind Stevenson	
2015	"After Hours"	Oliver Chen	
2015	"White Light/White Heat (Version 1 / The Complete Matrix Tapes)" (visualizer)	Meire Murakami/Vartan	
2015	"We're Gonna Have A Real Good Time Together (Version 2 / Live At The Matrix)" (visualizer)	Meire Murakami/Vartan	
2015	"Some Kinda Love (Version 4 / Live At The Matrix, San Francisco)" (visualizer)	Meire Murakami/Vartan	
2015	"Sister Ray (Live At The Matrix, San Francisco)" (visualizer)	Meire Murakami/Vartan	
2015	"Sweet Jane (Version 1 / Live At The Matrix, San Francisco)" (visualizer)	Meire Murakami/Vartan	
2017	"Sunday Morning"	James Eads/Chris McDaniel	

== See also ==
- List of songs recorded by the Velvet Underground
