= Gold (The Velvet Underground album) =

Greatest hits album by the Velvet Underground
- Released: June 14, 2005
- Recorded: 1966–1969
- Genre: Rock
- Label: Polydor
- Producers: Andy Warhol, Tom Wilson, The Velvet Underground

The Velvet Underground chronology
| The Very Best of The Velvet Underground (2003) | Gold (2005) | The Complete Matrix Tapes (2015) |

The Velvet Underground Story
- The Velvet Underground Story, European re-issue

Professional ratings
Review scores
| Source | Rating |
|---|---|
| AllMusic | 4.5/5 stars |
| Pitchfork Media | (9.3/10) |

Gold is a two-CD compilation album by the Velvet Underground. It was released for the North American market on June 14, 2005, by Polydor, the record label that oversees the band's Universal Music Group back catalogue.

The album is a greatest-hits compilation, drawing from the band's first three albums, two compilations of lost recordings, and a live album on Polydor Records and several co-owned labels (Verve, MGM and Mercury).

Gold also includes two Nico solo tracks, co-written and played by Velvet Underground members Lou Reed, John Cale and Sterling Morrison, taken from her 1967 debut album for Polydor, Chelsea Girl. Two tracks from the VU album of long-lost original songs—"Temptation Inside Your Heart" and "Stephanie Says"—are included in their previously unavailable original 1968 mixes. (The latter even includes some different instrumental and vocal parts.)

On May 29, 2006, the album was re-issued in Europe as The Velvet Underground Story with different artwork but featuring the same track listing.

== Track listing ==
All tracks performed by the Velvet Underground except † performed by the Velvet Underground & Nico and ‡ performed by Nico. All tracks written by Lou Reed except where noted.

Disc one

1. "I'm Waiting for the Man" – 4:40
2. "Femme Fatale"† – 2:39
3. "Venus in Furs" – 5:13
4. "Run Run Run" – 4:23
5. "All Tomorrow's Parties"† – 6:00
6. "Heroin" – 7:13
7. "There She Goes Again" – 2:42
8. "I'll Be Your Mirror"† – 2:15
9. "Sunday Morning" (Reed, John Cale)† – 2:57
10. "Chelsea Girls" (Reed, Sterling Morrison)‡ – 7:27
11. "It Was a Pleasure Then" (Nico, Reed, Cale)‡ – 8:03
12. "White Light/White Heat" – 2:48
13. "I Heard Her Call My Name" – 4:39
14. "Sister Ray" (Reed, Cale, Morrison, Maureen Tucker) – 17:27

Tracks 1–9 taken from The Velvet Underground & Nico (1967). Tracks 10–11 taken from Chelsea Girl (1967). Tracks 12–14 taken from White Light/White Heat (1968).

Disc two

1. "Temptation Inside Your Heart" (alternate, original mix) – 2:32
2. "Stephanie Says" (alternate, original mix) – 2:51
3. "Hey Mr. Rain" (version one) (Reed, Cale, Morrison, Tucker) – 4:42
4. "Candy Says" – 4:05
5. "What Goes On" – 4:55
6. "Some Kinda Love" – 4:04
7. "Pale Blue Eyes" – 5:41
8. "Beginning to See the Light" – 4:40
9. "Foggy Notion" (Reed, Morrison, Doug Yule, Tucker, Hy Weiss) – 6:48
10. "I Can't Stand It" – 3:22
11. "One of These Days" – 3:59
12. "Lisa Says" – 2:59
13. "New Age" (Live) – 6:36
14. "Rock & Roll" (Live) – 6:08
15. "Ocean" (Live) – 10:59
16. "Sweet Jane" (Live) – 4:01

Tracks 1–2 are their first appearances on any CD, regular mixes are available on VU (1985). Track 3 taken from Another View (1986). Tracks 4–8 taken from The Velvet Underground (1969). Tracks 9–12 taken from VU (1985). Tracks 13–16 taken from 1969: The Velvet Underground Live (1974), songs originally from Loaded (1970).

== Personnel ==
=== The Velvet Underground ===
- Lou Reed – vocals except where noted, guitar;
- Sterling Morrison – guitar, bass guitar, backing vocals
- Maureen Tucker – percussion
- John Cale – viola, bass guitar, keyboards, celesta (disc 1; disc 2: 1–3)
- Doug Yule – bass guitar, keyboards, backing vocals; lead vocal on "Candy says"; lead guitar on "One of These Days" (disc 2: 4–16)

=== Additional musicians ===
- Nico – lead vocals on "Femme Fatale", "All Tomorrow's Parties", "I'll Be Your Mirror", "Chelsea Girls" and "It Was a Pleasure Then", backing vocals on "Sunday Morning"

=== Technical ===
- Andy Warhol – producer (disc 1: 1–8)
- Tom Wilson – producer (disc 1: 9–14)
- The Velvet Underground – producers (disc 2)
- Gary Kellgren – engineer

== Charts ==
Chart performance for Gold
| Chart (2024) | Peak position |
|---|---|
| Greek Albums (IFPI) | 15 |
