= The Best of The Velvet Underground: Words and Music of Lou Reed =

Greatest hits album by The Velvet Underground
- Released: October 10, 1989
- Recorded: 1966–1970, New York City and Hollywood, United States
- Genre: Art rock, proto-punk
- Length: 61:43
- Language: English
- Label: Verve
- Producer: Various

The Velvet Underground chronology
| Squeeze (1973) | The Best of The Velvet Underground: Words and Music of Lou Reed (1989) |

There are Velvet Underground compilation albums with similar titles: The Best of The Velvet Underground: The Millennium Collection (2000) and The Very Best of The Velvet Underground (2003).

Professional ratings
Review scores
| Source | Rating |
|---|---|
| AllMusic | 4.5/5 stars |
| The Encyclopedia of Popular Music | 4/5 stars |

The Best of The Velvet Underground: Words and Music of Lou Reed is a compilation album by The Velvet Underground. It was released in October 1989 by Verve Records.

The Best of The Velvet Underground concludes the mid-1980s re-issue series by Verve Records of their Velvet Underground material (the first three albums plus VU and Another View).

== Track listing ==
All tracks were written by Lou Reed.

Side one

1. "I'm Waiting for the Man"
2. "Femme Fatale"
3. "Run Run Run"
4. "Heroin"
5. "All Tomorrow's Parties"
6. "I'll Be Your Mirror"
7. "White Light/White Heat"
8. "Stephanie Says"

Tracks 1–6 taken from The Velvet Underground & Nico (1967); Track 7 taken from White Light/White Heat (1968); Track 8 taken from VU (1985).

Side two

1. "What Goes On"
2. "Beginning to See the Light"
3. "Pale Blue Eyes"
4. "I Can't Stand It"
5. "Lisa Says"
6. "Sweet Jane"
7. "Rock and Roll"

Tracks 1–3 taken from The Velvet Underground (1969); Tracks 4–5 also taken from VU; Tracks 6–7 taken from Loaded (1970).

== Personnel ==
The Velvet Underground

- John Cale – bass guitar, viola, keyboards, celesta, backing vocals (side one)
- Sterling Morrison – guitar, backing vocals, bass guitar on "All Tomorrow's Parties"
- Lou Reed – vocals, guitar, piano on "White Light/White Heat"
- Maureen Tucker – percussion (except "Sweet Jane" and "Rock and Roll")
- Doug Yule – bass guitar, keyboards, backing vocals, drums and lead guitar on "Rock and Roll" (side two)

Additional musicians

- Nico – vocals on "Femme Fatale", "I'll Be Your Mirror" and "All Tomorrow's Parties"
- Adrian Barber – drums on "Sweet Jane"

Technical staff

- Andy Warhol – producer (The Velvet Underground & Nico)
- Tom Wilson – producer (White Light/White Heat)
- The Velvet Underground – producers (VU and The Velvet Underground)
- Geoff Haslam, Shel Kagan and The Velvet Underground – producers (Loaded)
- Bill Levenson – compilation executive producer
