= 20th Century Masters – The Millennium Collection: The Best of The Velvet Underground =

Greatest hits album by The Velvet Underground
- Released: October 2000
- Recorded: 1966–1969, New York City, Hollywood and San Francisco, United States
- Genre: Rock
- Length: 65:13
- Language: English
- Label: Polydor
- Producer: Andy Warhol, Tom Wilson, The Velvet Underground

The Velvet Underground chronology
Squeeze (1973)	20th Century Masters – The Millennium Collection: The Best of The Velvet Underground (2000)

Classic Velvet Underground
- Classic Velvet Underground, European release

There are Velvet Underground compilation albums with similar titles: The Best of The Velvet Underground: Words and Music of Lou Reed (1989) and The Very Best of The Velvet Underground (2003).

Professional ratings
Review scores
Source	Rating
Allmusic	3/5 stars
The Encyclopedia of Popular Music	4/5 stars

20th Century Masters – The Millennium Collection: The Best of The Velvet Underground is a compilation album by The Velvet Underground. It was initially released for the North American market by Polydor in October 2000 as part of their "20th Century Masters" series of budget compilations celebrating the turn of the century. The album was subsequently released with varying titles and covers in Europe.

== About the album ==
The Best of The Velvet Underground: The Millennium Collection is a straight, chronologically sequenced trawl through the studio and live albums that the band recorded for Verve Records, MGM Records and Mercury Records.

The Best of The Velvet Underground: The Millennium Collection was initially released in the United States and subsequently in the same configuration for the European market. In the United Kingdom, the album was quickly superseded by another budget compilation, Rock and Roll: an Introduction to The Velvet Underground, which had its own selection of tracks.

A number of other European countries (re-)released The Best of The Velvet Underground: The Millennium Collection with different titles and cover art, yet always with the same track listing. These include Classic Velvet Underground (Polydor/UMG's European edition of the album, in the Universal Masters Collection series), Millennium Edition (Germany), and Velvet Underground (France). Both the American and European editions were simultaneously released for the European market, differing only in cover art (and catalogue number).

== Track listing ==
All tracks written by Lou Reed except "Sister Ray" written by Reed, John Cale, Sterling Morrison and Maureen Tucker.

1. "I'm Waiting for the Man" – 4:38
2. "Run Run Run" – 4:20
3. "Heroin" – 7:10
4. "White Light/White Heat" – 2:44
5. "Sister Ray" – 17:22
6. "Beginning to See the Light" – 4:38
7. "What Goes On" – 4:52
8. "Pale Blue Eyes" – 4:38
9. "I Can't Stand It" – 3:21
10. "Sweet Jane" (live) – 3:58
11. "Rock and Roll" (live) – 6:02

Tracks 1–3 taken from The Velvet Underground & Nico (1967)
Tracks 4–5 taken from White Light/White Heat (1968)
Tracks 6–8 taken from The Velvet Underground (1969)
Track 9 taken from VU (1985, recorded May 1969)
Tracks 10–11 taken from 1969: The Velvet Underground Live (1974, recorded October 1969)

== Personnel ==
The Velvet Underground

- Lou Reed – vocals, guitar, piano on "White Light/White Heat"
- Sterling Morrison – guitar, backing vocals
- Maureen Tucker – percussion
- John Cale – viola, bass guitar, backing vocals, organ on "Sister Ray" (1–5)
- Doug Yule – bass guitar, backing vocals, organ on "What Goes On" (6–11)

Technical staff

- Andy Warhol – producer (1–3)
- Tom Wilson – producer (4–5)
- The Velvet Underground – producers (6–11)
