= The Very Best of The Velvet Underground =

Greatest hits album by the Velvet Underground
- Released: March 31, 2003
- Recorded: 1966–1970, New York City and Hollywood, US
- Genre: Rock; art rock; experimental rock; folk rock
- Length: 74:29
- Language: English
- Label: Polydor
- Producer: Andy Warhol; Tom Wilson; The Velvet Underground; Geoff Haslam; Shel Kagan

The Velvet Underground chronology
Squeeze (1973)	The Very Best of The Velvet Underground (2003)

There are Velvet Underground compilation albums with similar titles: The Best of The Velvet Underground: Words and Music of Lou Reed (1989) and The Best of The Velvet Underground: The Millennium Collection (2000).

Professional ratings
Review scores
Source	Rating
AllMusic	4/5 stars
The Encyclopedia of Popular Music	4/5 stars

The Very Best of The Velvet Underground is a compilation album by the Velvet Underground. It was released in Europe on March 31, 2003, by Polydor, the record label that oversees the band's Universal Music Group back catalog.

The album was released following a Hyundai television commercial, which featured the band's 1970 recording "I'm Sticking with You" from the "Fully Loaded" edition of Loaded. The version included in this compilation is from the VU album (recorded in 1969, released in 1985), despite a sticker's claim to the contrary on the front cover.

== Track listing ==
All tracks performed by the Velvet Underground except † The Velvet Underground & Nico. All titles written by Lou Reed except as noted.

No.	Title	Writer(s)	Original album	Length
1.	"Sweet Jane"		Loaded (1970)	3:55
2.	"I'm Sticking with You" (1969 version)		VU (1985)	3:21
3.	"I'm Waiting for the Man"		The Velvet Underground & Nico (1967)	4:37
4.	"What Goes On"		The Velvet Underground (1969)	4:55
5.	"White Light/White Heat"		White Light/White Heat (1968)	2:47
6.	"All Tomorrow's Parties†"		The Velvet Underground & Nico	5:55
7.	"Pale Blue Eyes"		The Velvet Underground	5:41
8.	"Femme Fatale†"		The Velvet Underground & Nico	2:35
9.	"Heroin"		The Velvet Underground & Nico	7:05
10.	"Here She Comes Now"	Lou Reed; John Cale; Sterling Morrison	White Light/White Heat	2:04
11.	"Stephanie Says"		VU	2:49
12.	"Venus in Furs"		The Velvet Underground & Nico	5:07
13.	"Beginning to See the Light"		The Velvet Underground	4:41
14.	"I Heard Her Call My Name"		White Light/White Heat	4:38
15.	"Some Kinda Love" (alternate take)		The Velvet Underground	3:39
16.	"I Can't Stand It"		VU	3:21
17.	"Sunday Morning†"	Reed; Cale	The Velvet Underground & Nico	2:53
18.	"Rock & Roll"		Loaded	4:47
Total length:				75:11

== Personnel ==
The Velvet Underground

- John Cale – viola, bass guitar, keyboards, celesta (3, 5–6, 8–12, 14, 17)
- Sterling Morrison – guitar, bass guitar, backing vocals
- Lou Reed – vocals except as noted, guitar, piano
- Maureen Tucker – percussion (2–17), vocals on "I'm Sticking with You"
- Doug Yule – bass guitar, keyboards, guitar, drums, backing vocals (1–2, 4, 7, 13, 15–16, 18)

Additional musicians

- Nico – lead vocals on "All Tomorrow's Parties" and "Femme Fatale", backing vocals on "Sunday Morning"

Technical staff

- Andy Warhol – producer
- Tom Wilson – producer
- The Velvet Underground – producers
- Geoff Haslam, Shel Kagan and The Velvet Underground – producers
