= Rock and Roll Diary: 1967–1980 =

Compilation album by Lou Reed
- Released: December 1980
- Recorded: 1966–1980
- Genre: Rock
- Length: 74:29
- Label: Arista

Lou Reed chronology
Growing Up in Public (1980)	Rock and Roll Diary: 1967–1980 (1980)	The Blue Mask (1982)

Professional ratings
Review scores
Source	Rating
AllMusic	3/5 stars
Robert Christgau	B

Rock and Roll Diary: 1967–1980 is a compilation album by Lou Reed. It was released by Arista Records in 1980 as a double album split between tracks by the Velvet Underground and tracks by Reed, attempting to demonstrate the arc of his songwriting over the first fifteen years of his career.

The versions of "Heroin" and "Femme Fatale" are from the Velvet Underground live album 1969: The Velvet Underground Live (1974). "Coney Island Baby" comes from Live: Take No Prisoners.

The liner notes for the album were written by Ellen Willis.

== Track listing ==
1. "Waiting for the Man"
2. "White Light/White Heat"
3. "I Heard Her Call My Name"
4. "Pale Blue Eyes"
5. "Beginning to See the Light"
6. "Sweet Jane"
7. "Rock & Roll"
8. "Heroin" (live)
9. "Femme Fatale" (live)
10. "Walk on the Wild Side"
11. "Berlin"
12. "Men of Good Fortune"
13. "The Kids"
14. "Coney Island Baby" (live)
15. "Temporary Thing"
16. "All Through the Night"
17. "So Alone"
18. "How Do You Speak to an Angel"
19. "Keep Away"
20. "Street Hassle"

An edited version of the album was released on compact disc on September 27, 1994.

== Track listing (CD) ==
1. "Waiting for the Man"
2. "White Light/White Heat"
3. "I Heard Her Call My Name"
4. "Pale Blue Eyes"
5. "Sweet Jane"
6. "Rock & Roll"
7. "Heroin" (live)
8. "Femme Fatale" (live)
9. "Walk on the Wild Side"
10. "Berlin"
11. "Temporary Thing"
12. "All Through the Night"
13. "So Alone"
14. "Keep Away"
15. "Street Hassle"
