= The Complete Matrix Tapes =

Live album by the Velvet Underground
- Released: November 20, 2015
- Recorded: November 26–27, 1969
- Venues: The Matrix Club, 3138 Fillmore Street, San Francisco, CA
- Genres: Art rock; proto-punk; pop rock; experimental rock
- Length: 274:42
- Labels: Polydor; Universal

The Velvet Underground chronology
Bootleg Series Volume 1: The Quine Tapes (2001)	The Complete Matrix Tapes (2015)

The Complete Matrix Tapes is a live album by the New York City-based experimental rock band the Velvet Underground, released on November 20, 2015. It features unexpurgated recordings of the band's two-night stint on November 26 and 27, 1969, at San Francisco club The Matrix, owned and operated by Jefferson Airplane's Marty Balin.

== Background ==
The band's appearance represents one of the rare occasions on which the Velvet Underground was professionally recorded in a live setting, and while several of the performances in this set have been released in various fashions and configurations before (in particular, on the album 1969: The Velvet Underground Live and the 45th anniversary reissue of The Velvet Underground, as well as via much lower-quality audience recordings in Bootleg Series Volume 1: The Quine Tapes), it is the first time all of them have been collected together. Additionally, this represents the first time much of this material has been presented in a CD version sourced directly from the original tapes, which had been considered lost for decades, and nine tracks from this collection had previously been completely unreleased in any configuration. The original reels were held by Matrix soundman/manager Peter Abram. Though long rumored, the recordings had not been heard other than the tracks issued on 1969: The Velvet Underground Live. It was not until the late 90's that Abram was persuaded to bring the beautifully preserved reels to a recording studio to do a proper transfer/mix-down. He would only allow short snippets of the 22 tracks to be burned onto a sampler disc in order to verify the high audio quality to interested labels. The original transfer was financed and executed by Sal Mercuri and Pat Thomas. Universal Music and The Velvet Underground Partnership eventually struck a deal with Abram to allow for a proper and complete release of the performances. During the mixing process, a gap was discovered in one of the very lengthy performances of "Sister Ray". This gap was caused by the time it took to change the reel during the performance. It was decided to restore the missing music using part of the same performance from the intact, albeit sonically far inferior version available on Bootleg Series Volume 1: The Quine Tapes.

Two of the songs from these performances, "Over You" and "Sweet Bonnie Brown/It's Too Much", have never been released as studio recordings by the band, and it is not known whether the band ever recorded them in the studio. Songs such as "Sweet Jane" and "New Age" feature significantly different or expanded lyrics from their eventual studio counterparts (which would both be released in 1970 on Loaded), while others such as "Sister Ray" and "White Light/White Heat" are substantially longer than their studio versions.

== Reception ==
Professional ratings
Aggregate scores
Source	Rating
Metacritic	86/100
Review scores
Source	Rating
Allmusic	4.5/5 stars
The Austin Chronicle	4/5 stars
Classic Rock	4/5 stars
The Guardian	5/5 stars
Pitchfork	8.5/10
Q	4/5 stars
Record Collector	3/5 stars
Robert Christgau	A−
Rolling Stone	4/5 stars
Uncut	8/10 stars

The album – which received a Metacritic score of 86 based on 13 reviews (indicating "universal acclaim") – was widely praised both for its sound quality and for the power of its performances.

== Track listing ==
All songs written by Lou Reed, except "Black Angel's Death Song" by Reed and John Cale, and "Sister Ray" by Reed, Cale, Sterling Morrison and Maureen Tucker.

Disc 1 (Set One – 11/26/69 early show)
No.	Title	Length
1.	"I'm Waiting for the Man" (**)	13:07
2.	"What Goes On" (*)	8:53
3.	"Some Kinda Love"	4:58
4.	"Heroin"	8:07
5.	"The Black Angel's Death Song" (**)	6:19
6.	"Venus in Furs"	4:37
7.	"There She Goes Again"	3:13
8.	"We're Gonna Have a Real Good Time Together" (*)	3:20
9.	"Over You" (*)	2:23
10.	"Sweet Jane"	5:11
11.	"Pale Blue Eyes"	6:05
12.	"After Hours"	2:56
Total length:		69:09

Disc 2 (Set Two – 11/26/69 late show)
No.	Title	Length
1.	"I'm Waiting for the Man" (*)	6:33
2.	"Venus in Furs" (**)	5:11
3.	"Some Kinda Love" (*)	4:04
4.	"Over You"	3:02
5.	"I Can't Stand It" (*)	7:54
6.	"There She Goes Again"	2:50
7.	"After Hours"	2:30
8.	"We're Gonna Have a Real Good Time Together"	3:40
9.	"Sweet Bonnie Brown / Too Much" (*)	7:50
10.	"Heroin" (*)	10:05
11.	"White Light/White Heat" (**)	9:27
12.	"I'm Set Free"	4:46
Total length:		67:52

Disc 3 (Set Three – 11/27/69 early show)
No.	Title	Length
1.	"We're Gonna Have a Real Good Time Together"	3:15
2.	"Some Kinda Love"	4:38
3.	"There She Goes Again"	2:59
4.	"Heroin" (*)	8:27
5.	"Ocean" (*)	10:59
6.	"Sister Ray" (**)	36:54
Total length:		67:12

Disc 4 (Set Four – 11/27/69 late show)
No.	Title	Length
1.	"I'm Waiting for the Man"	5:30
2.	"What Goes On"	4:31
3.	"Some Kinda Love"	4:03
4.	"We're Gonna Have a Real Good Time Together"	3:24
5.	"Beginning to See the Light" (*)	5:30
6.	"Lisa Says" (*)	5:59
7.	"New Age" (*)	6:28
8.	"Rock & Roll" (* / **)	6:54
9.	"I Can't Stand It"	6:52
10.	"Heroin"	8:17
11.	"White Light/White Heat" (*)	8:42
12.	"Sweet Jane" (*)	4:19
Total length:		70:30

All performances previously unreleased, except:
(*) Performance appears on 1969: The Velvet Underground Live (1974), in a different mix.
(**) Performance appears on Bootleg Series Volume 1: The Quine Tapes (2001), from an alternate audience recording source.

== Personnel ==
The Velvet Underground

- Lou Reed – vocals, guitar
- Sterling Morrison – guitar, bass guitar, vocals
- Doug Yule – bass guitar, organ, vocals
- Maureen Tucker – drums, vocals

=== Additional credits ===
- Bill Levenson – compilation producer
- Meire Murakami – design
- David Fricke – liner notes
- Kevin Reeves – mastering
- Tardon – mixing
- Dan Rose – production manager
- Monique McGuffin Newman – production manager
- Peter Abram – recording
- Sal Mercuri – research, production manager
- Alfredo Garcia, Lau Buur Nielsen, Oliver Landemaine – photo research assistance
