= Bootleg Series Volume 1: The Quine Tapes =

Live album by the Velvet Underground
- Released: October 16, 2001
- Recorded: May, November–December 1969, St. Louis and San Francisco, United States
- Genre: Rock
- Length: 230:03
- Labels: Polydor; Universal
- Producer: The Velvet Underground

The Velvet Underground chronology
| Final V.U. 1971–1973 (2001) | Bootleg Series Volume 1: The Quine Tapes (2001) | The Complete Matrix Tapes (2015) |

Professional ratings
Review scores
| Source | Rating |
|---|---|
| AllMusic | 4/5 stars |
| Robert Christgau | A− |
| Pitchfork | (9.4/10) |

Bootleg Series Volume 1: The Quine Tapes is a triple live album by the Velvet Underground. It was released on October 16, 2001, by Polydor, the record label overseeing the band's UMG back catalogue. It was recorded by Robert Quine, a fan of the band who would later become an influential guitarist, playing with Richard Hell, Lou Reed, and Lloyd Cole.

== The Quine Tapes ==
During 1969, the Velvet Underground toured the United States and Canada, playing well over 70 dates. By this time, the band had picked up a sizeable fan base and every now and then a fan would bring along, with consent of the band, recording equipment to record a set. Most of the time, this would mean relatively simple hand-held recorders resulting in lo-fi mono audience recordings, as with this set and the live album Live at Max's Kansas City (1972). The double album 1969: The Velvet Underground Live (1974) was the notable exception, using stereo soundboard recordings), primarily from The Matrix in San Francisco.

Robert Quine, an avid Velvet Underground fan, used to travel to as many concerts as possible. He became friends with the band and they allowed him to record sets from the audience, occasionally asking for playbacks. Quine recorded many concerts, but as his original cassette tapes began to wear out, he compiled four reels of what he considered the best material. These "best-of" reels were ultimately released in 2001 as the present The Quine Tapes set. The original cassettes from which the reels were compiled no longer exist.

Musically, The Quine Tapes finds the band in the same phase in their history as documented on 1969—the two sets even share a performance of "Rock and Roll", recorded at the same concert by both Quine and the Matrix sound personnel. Quine's tapes, although lo-fi audience recordings, capture much more of the music's ambience, especially in the larger venues, such as Washington University in St. Louis. Additionally, The Quine Tapes contains songs that the band only rarely performed by this time, such as "Sunday Morning", "Venus in Furs" and "The Black Angel's Death Song", along with other obscurities such as "Over You", "Ride into the Sun", and "Follow the Leader", which had never even been bootlegged in its original form.

== The Bootleg series ==
The Quine Tapes is, to date, the only entry in the Bootleg series. The second volume was to be a recording of an April 1967 show at the Gymnasium in New York City, which marked the live debut of "Sister Ray". Two songs from the show, "Guess I'm Falling in Love" and "Booker T", appeared on the box set Peel Slowly and See (1995), and the full show was released in December 2013 as part of the "Super Deluxe" reissue of White Light/White Heat. It contains the only known recorded performance of "I'm Not a Young Man Anymore".

== Track listing ==
All tracks are written by Lou Reed, except where noted.

Disc 1
| No. | Title | Writer(s) | Recording date and venue | Length |
|---|---|---|---|---|
| 1. | "I'm Waiting for the Man" | | November 8, 1969, Family Dog Ballroom | 7:46 |
| 2. | "It's Just Too Much" | | November 8, 1969, Family Dog Ballroom | 4:08 |
| 3. | "What Goes On" | | November 8, 1969, Family Dog Ballroom | 8:25 |
| 4. | "I Can't Stand It" | | November 8, 1969, Family Dog Ballroom | 6:20 |
| 5. | "Some Kinda Love" | | November 8, 1969, Family Dog Ballroom | 4:48 |
| 6. | "Foggy Notion" | Reed, Sterling Morrison, Doug Yule, Maureen Tucker, Hy Weiss | November 8, 1969, Family Dog Ballroom | 4:41 |
| 7. | "Femme Fatale" | | November 7, 1969, Family Dog Ballroom | 3:14 |
| 8. | "After Hours" | | November 8, 1969, Family Dog Ballroom | 3:05 |
| 9. | "I'm Sticking with You" | | November 8, 1969, Family Dog Ballroom | 2:48 |
| 10. | "Sunday Morning" | Reed, John Cale | November 9, 1969, Family Dog Ballroom | 2:56 |
| 11. | "Sister Ray" | Reed, Cale, Morrison, Tucker | November 7, 1969, Family Dog Ballroom | 24:03 |

Disc 2
| No. | Title | Writer(s) | Recording date and venue | Length |
|---|---|---|---|---|
| 1. | "Follow the Leader" | | November 27, 1969, The Matrix | 17:05 |
| 2. | "White Light/White Heat" | | December 1, 1969, The Matrix | 10:03 |
| 3. | "Venus in Furs" | | December 1, 1969, The Matrix | 5:14 |
| 4. | "Heroin" | | November 23, 1969, The Matrix | 8:11 |
| 5. | "Sister Ray" | Reed, Cale, Morrison, Tucker | December 3, 1969, The Matrix | 38:00 |

Disc 3
| No. | Title | Writer(s) | Recording date and venue | Length |
|---|---|---|---|---|
| 1. | "Rock and Roll" | | November 25, 1969, The Matrix | 6:49 |
| 2. | "New Age" | | November 24, 1969, The Matrix | 11:21 |
| 3. | "Over You" | | November 25, 1969, The Matrix | 2:41 |
| 4. | "The Black Angel's Death Song" | Reed, Cale | November 23, 1969, The Matrix | 5:54 |
| 5. | "I'm Waiting for the Man" | | November 27, 1969, The Matrix | 11:37 |
| 6. | "Ride into the Sun" | | November 24, 1969, The Matrix | 11:11 |
| 7. | "Sister Ray" / "Foggy Notion" | Reed, Cale, Morrison, Tucker / Reed, Morrison, Yule, Tucker, Weiss | May 11, 1969, Washington University | 28:43 |

== Personnel ==
The Velvet Underground

- Lou Reed – vocals, rhythm and lead guitar
- Sterling Morrison – lead and rhythm guitar, backing vocals, bass
- Doug Yule – bass guitar, organ, backing vocals, lead vocal on "Ride into the Sun"
- Maureen Tucker – percussion, lead vocals on "After Hours" and "I'm Sticking with You"

Technical staff

- Robert Quine – recording engineer
- The Velvet Underground – producers
- Jeff Willens - mastering engineer
