= What Goes On =

What Goes On may refer to:

- What Goes On (album), a 1993 box set by The Velvet Underground
- "What Goes On" (Beatles song), 1965
- "What Goes On" (Velvet Underground song), 1969
- "What Goes On", a single by Mai Tai (band) E. van Tijn, J. Fluitsma 1984
- "What Goes On", a song by Mobb Deep from The Safe Is Cracked
