= The Universal Masters Collection =

The Universal Masters Collection may refer to:

- The Universal Masters Collection (Grace Jones album), 2003
- Classic Tears for Fears: The Universal Masters Collection, 2000
- Classic Velvet Underground, a reissue of 20th Century Masters – The Millennium Collection: The Best of the Velvet Underground
