= The Matrix (club) =

Defunct San Francisco nightclub

- Interactive map of The Matrix
- Address: 3138 Fillmore Street
- Location: San Francisco, California, U.S.
- Coordinates: 37°47′55″N 122°26′08″W
- Capacity: 100
- Event: Psychedelic rock

Construction
- Opened: 1965
- Closed: 1972

The Matrix was a nightclub in San Francisco from 1965 to 1972 and was one of the keys to what eventually became known as the "San Francisco sound" in rock music. Located at 3138 Fillmore Street in Cow Hollow, in a 100-capacity beer-and-pizza shop, The Matrix opened 13 August 1965, showcasing Jefferson Airplane, which singer Marty Balin had put together as the club's "house band". Balin had persuaded three limited partners to put up $3,000 apiece to finance the club's opening, giving them 75 percent ownership, while he retained 25 percent for creating and managing it.

== Emergence of Jefferson Airplane ==
Jefferson Airplane rose rapidly to local prominence during late 1965 and early 1966 with their performances at The Matrix, and it was there that they were first seen by noted music critic Ralph J. Gleason, who became an early champion of the group.

The Matrix was a favorite haunt of gonzo journalist Hunter S. Thompson in the late 1960s – it was briefly mentioned in Fear and Loathing in Las Vegas during a flashback. Thompson was a contributing editor for Rolling Stone magazine (founded in 1967 in San Francisco).

== Music ==
The Matrix was an important venue in the formative years of the San Francisco rock music scene, featuring not only rock bands but also several blues artists and blues bands, with an occasional jazz artist thrown in. Besides Jefferson Airplane, many other well-known bands and musicians performed there:

- The Mystery Trend
- Big Brother and the Holding Company
- Elvin Bishop Band
- Blackburn & Snow
- The Blues Project
- Sandy Bull
- Butterfield Blues Band
- The Chambers Brothers
- The Charlatans
- Commander Cody and his Lost Planet Airmen
- Congress of Wonders
- Country Joe & the Fish
- The Doors
- Electric Flag
- Ramblin' Jack Elliot
- Flamin' Groovies
- Grateful Dead
- The Great Society
- Vince Guaraldi Quartet
- Dan Hicks & His Hot Licks
- Hot Tuna
- Howlin' Wolf
- It's a Beautiful Day
- Jerry Garcia & Friends (aka Jerry Garcia Band)
- John Lee Hooker
- Lightnin' Hopkins
- Mad River
- Harvey Mandel
- Marvin Gardens (November 8–9, 1968)
- Mickey & the Hartbeats (a subset of the Grateful Dead consisting of Mickey Hart, Jerry Garcia, Phil Lesh, and Bill Kreutzmann)
- Steve Miller Blues Band (with Boz Scaggs before he formed his own band)
- Moby Grape
- Charlie Musselwhite
- The New Age
- New Riders of the Purple Sage
- New York Dolls
- The Only Alternative and His Other Possibilities (October 18 thru 23, 1966 and February 17–19, 1967)
- Otis Rush
- Quicksilver Messenger Service
- Boz Scaggs
- Rosalie Sorrels
- Santana
- Siegel-Schwall Band
- Sonny Terry & Brownie McGhee
- Sopwith Camel
- Status Quo
- Steel Mill (with Bruce Springsteen)
- The Sparrow (before they changed their name to Steppenwolf)
- T-Bone Walker
- Taj Mahal
- The Tubes
- The Velvet Underground
- The Wailers
- Johnny Winter

Created and operated by musicians, the Matrix was popular with local and visiting musicians. On their off nights, many would go there to hear other groups they knew or just to visit. Management would waive the cover charge for prominent musicians who entered the club as customers.

== Original club layout ==
In the early years of The Matrix, there was a huge mural of the Four Horsemen of the Apocalypse on the left wall near the rear; rumor was that the members of Jefferson Airplane had painted it before the club first opened. Another wall was adorned with hieroglyphics. The club's lighting was very subdued everywhere but on its small stage.

The club itself was very small; its max occupancy was only around 120 people. The entrance was recessed about two feet and was left of center on the windowless wall seen from the street, and there was a cabinet outside to the door's right where upcoming bands were listed and handbills were posted. Inside, near the entrance, there was a bar (beer and wine license only) on the front left. The interior was about 50 by 80 feet. The ceiling at the front third of the club was about ten feet high, but farther back, it went up to about 18 feet. The right front area had chairs and most of the cocktail tables, while the center of the room to the rear was a dance floor. The stage was a step above the floor on the right side, center to rear. A small sound booth occupied the center of the left wall, and a few cocktail tables were at the left rear in front of the mural. The rear wall had a window opening for the small galley used to prepare food.

== Ownership change ==
Sometime in 1966 or 1967, Marty Balin sold his share of the club to Peter Abram and Gary Jackson, two of the original partners; they bought out the remaining partner. Abram actively managed the club room and made bookings while also recording those musicians he knew and liked. Jackson took care of accounting and general business matters. For a brief period toward the end of 1966, Bill Ehlert, better known as the "Jolly Blue Giant" or simply "Jolly", owner of the Jabberwock in Berkeley, took over running The Matrix. This brought a distinct change to the booking policy whereby Jabberwock favorites Country Joe and the Fish, the New Age and Blackburn & Snow performed. Another change was seen in the advertising of shows, with Jabberwock house artist Tom Weller producing some classic posters and handbills.

== Live music albums recorded at The Matrix ==
recorded	released	album	artist	label	format
1966	1968	Conspicuous Only in Its Absence	The Great Society	Columbia Records (9624)	LP
1966	1968	How It Was	The Great Society	Columbia Records (9702)	LP
1966	1971	Collector's Item	The Great Society	Legacy Recordings/Sony BMG	2-LP
1966	1989	Live At The Matrix	The Great Society	Edsel,UK	CD
1967	2008	The Lost Tapes	Big Brother & the Holding Company	Airline	CD
1967	2008	Live at the Matrix 1967	The Doors	Rhino/WMG	CD
1967	1969	Early Steppenwolf	Steppenwolf	ABC Dunhill (DS-50060)	LP
1968	2010	Return to the Matrix 02/01/68	Jefferson Airplane	Collectors' Choice Music Live	CD
1969	1974	1969: The Velvet Underground Live	The Velvet Underground	Mercury Records	LP, CD
1969	2001, 2010	Bootleg Series Volume 1: The Quine Tapes	The Velvet Underground	Polydor Records (314 589 067-2), Sundazed Music (VU 4002)	3-CD, 6-LP
1969	2015	The Complete Matrix Tapes	The Velvet Underground	Universal Music Enterprises (B0023 955-02)	4-CD
1967	2023	Live at the Matrix 1967: The Original Masters	The Doors	Rhino/WMG/Bright Midnight Archives	5-LP, 3-CD

=== The Great Society tapes ===
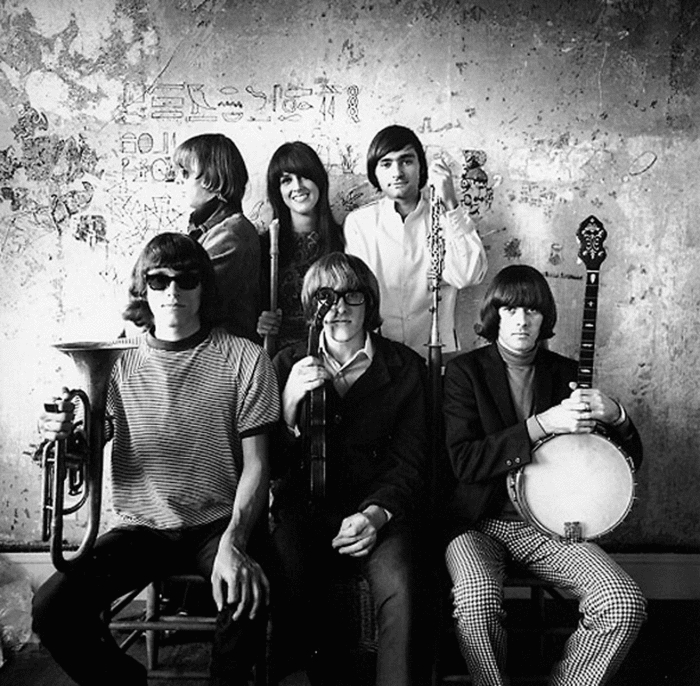
Jefferson Airplane's Surrealistic Pillow album cover photo

In 1968, after finally getting all the necessary releases, The Matrix's owners sold to Columbia Records some tapes of live sets from 1966 by The Great Society (the band Grace Slick belonged to before replacing Signe Anderson in Jefferson Airplane). Edits of those tapes (including the first commercial recordings of "White Rabbit" and "Somebody to Love") eventually became two LPs, Conspicuous Only in Its Absence and How It Was (promoted as by "Grace Slick & The Great Society"). Over 20 years later, identical combinations of the two albums were re-released under different names as CDs by two different labels, because of separate licensing agreements in the US and the United Kingdom.

=== Early Steppenwolf tapes ===
Released by ABC Dunhill Records in 1969, the album Early Steppenwolf was material recorded live at The Matrix, purportedly on May 14, 1967, more than a year before the remodeling. However, the recordings were actually made when Steppenwolf was still called The Sparrow and were taped between May 9 and May 11, 1967 or between May 19 and 21. On May 14, the Sopwith Camel were playing the last day of a three-day set at The Matrix and The Sparrow did not appear.

=== Big Brother and the Holding Company tapes ===
First released in 2008 on the Airline label, the first disc of The Lost Tapes consists of a set from a Big Brother gig at The Matrix taped on January 31, 1967 before the band was well known.

== Remodeling ==
The earnings from the Great Society tapes enabled a major remodeling of The Matrix, including a professional mixing booth and two higher quality tape decks, as well as major improvements to the sound and lighting systems. As part of its contract, Columbia Records also created a custom mixing board for the club, hoping for additional tapes of future live performances.

The entrance was moved to the far right of the street wall and the ceiling was opened up to its full 18-foot height for the entire room. Just to the left of the entrance, against the street wall, was the new mixing booth, with its large, doubled-glass windows facing the main room. The stage was moved to the center of the left wall and was two feet above the dance floor, measuring 12 by 8 feet (instead of the 10 x 18 dimensions of the original stage). Large speaker systems were mounted near the ceiling in the left front and left rear corners. A new stage lighting system hung from the ceiling just in front of the stage.

== End of The Matrix ==
The Matrix continued to showcase local and visiting bands for a few more years. It was always a hangout for local musicians, famous or otherwise, both because of its history and because of the owners' respect for serious musicians. The club closed in 1972; although briefly reopening at a new location (412 Broadway, previously "Mr D's") in the fall of 1973.

When The Matrix closed, a nearby bar, Pierce Street Annex, leased the space and moved in, remodeling once again, and turned it into a nightclub with only a DJ and no live music. After the Pierce Street Annex closed, then-Mayor Gavin Newsom's company, PlumpJack Group, took over in 2000 and renamed the space The MatrixFillmore. Live music was incorporated into the venue during the first few years; however, this layout was not a viable venue for live music and the program was dropped. The MatrixFillmore was one of the first ultra lounges in San Francisco. In 2017, the club name was changed back to The Matrix, described as a casual neighborhood bar with DJs and dancing on weekends. In 2018, The Matrix was remodeled and renamed the White Rabbit.

== See also ==
- San Francisco Bay Area
- Wikipedia:WikiProject Rock music
- Wikipedia:WikiProject San Francisco Bay Area
- Wikipedia:WikiProject California
