= Andy's Chest =

Song by Lou Reed

from the album Transformer
- Released: 1972
- Recorded: 1972
- Studio: Trident (London)
- Genre: Avant-pop
- Length: 3:22
- Label: RCA
- Songwriter: Lou Reed
- Producers: David Bowie; Mick Ronson

"Andy's Chest" is a song written by Lou Reed, inspired by the 1968 attempted assassination of Andy Warhol. In June 1968, radical feminist writer Valerie Solanas shot artist and filmmaker Andy Warhol and Mario Amaya, art critic and curator, at Warhol's studio, The Factory. The Velvet Underground, of which Reed was the frontman, initially recorded the song in 1969, but this version went unreleased at the time. It was later re-recorded for Reed's solo release Transformer (1972), co-produced by David Bowie and Mick Ronson.

The Velvet Underground recording of the song, eventually released on the album VU in 1985, is an upbeat pop track. The arrangement that appears on Transformer has a slower tempo and features Herbie Flowers on bass and Bowie on backing vocals. This song is a tribute to Warhol, who was Reed's mentor and lifelong friend. Warhol had supported the Velvet Underground through financing, promotion, bookings, and designing the cover of their debut album. Eventually resenting Warhol's degree of control (Warhol had inserted the actress and singer Nico into the band's line-up infuriating Reed and band member John Cale), the band broke with Nico, Warhol and the whole New York art scene in which they had become entrenched to pursue a rock tour and planning of their second album, White Light/White Heat (1968). Warhol was shot by Solanas immediately after the split and only narrowly survived. "Andy's Chest" was written in sympathy and in thanks to Warhol. The title points to the substantial scar across Warhol's chest (the shot went through both lungs, spleen, stomach, liver, and esophagus), while the song lyrics refer to Warhol's studio The Factory and the artists who populated it.

== Reception ==
Spin said the Velvet Underground version was a "slightly gauche tryout of a song that will return in a sharper and better-produced form on subsequent Lou Reed solo albums".

== Personnel ==
- Lou Reed: lead vocals, rhythm guitar
- David Bowie: backing vocals
- Mick Ronson: lead guitars
- Herbie Flowers: bass
- John Halsey: drums

== See also ==
- "Andy Warhol", David Bowie's own tribute to the artist
