= Stephanie Says =

Song by The Velvet Underground

Song by the Velvet Underground

from the album VU
- Released: February 1985
- Recorded: February 13–14, 1968
- Studio: A&R, New York
- Genre: Baroque pop
- Length: 2:50
- Label: Verve
- Songwriter: Lou Reed
- Producer: Val Valentin

"Stephanie Says" is a song written by American musician Lou Reed and first recorded by his group the Velvet Underground in 1968.

Although long available on various bootlegs, the song was not released officially until 1985 when a remixed version appeared on the album VU, and subsequently on the 1995 box set Peel Slowly and See. The original 1968 mix of "Stephanie Says" was included on the 2005 Velvet Underground compilation album Gold.

The song has been described as baroque pop by Goldmine Magazine and Paste and ranked among the Velvet Underground’s best songs.

== Caroline Says II ==
"Caroline Says II"

Song by Lou Reed

from the album Berlin
- Released: October 5, 1973
- Studio: Record Plant (New York City)
- Genre: Art rock
- Length: 4:10
- Label: RCA Victor
- Songwriter: Lou Reed
- Producer: Bob Ezrin

Lou Reed rewrote the lyrics and renamed it "Caroline Says II" for his 1973 solo album Berlin. While vastly different in tone, it retained the refrain "It's so cold in Alaska".

== Reception ==
Spin said the Velvet Underground version was, "Virtually a direct referral to the first album. Both the melody and the function — another bittersweet homage to the negative girls of fashionable Manhattan —steers it awfully close to "All Tomorrow's Parties II"."

== Cover versions ==
- Lee Ranaldo of Sonic Youth covered the song on Fifteen Minutes: A Tribute to the Velvet Underground.
- Keren Ann and Barði Jóhannson, lead singer of Icelandic band Bang Gang covered the song on their album Lady and Bird.
- Serbian rock band Eva Braun covered the song with lyrics in the Serbian language in 1993 for the various artist compilation Radio Utopia. The song was released again as a bonus track on the remastered edition of their second studio album Pop Music.
- Icelandic singer Emilíana Torrini covered the song for her 1996 studio album Merman. Her version of the song reached number one on Iceland's Íslenski Listinn Topp 40 chart in January 1997 and ended the year at number 62 on the year-end chart.

== Related media ==
- In 2001, the song was used in the Wes Anderson film The Royal Tenenbaums.
- The song is referenced heavily in Amanda Palmer's "Blake Says" on her 2008 solo album Who Killed Amanda Palmer.
- The name of the main protagonist Alaska Young in John Green's 2005 novel, Looking for Alaska, was inspired by the line "She’s not afraid to die / The people all call her Alaska".
