= Another View =

Compilation album by the Velvet Underground
- Released: September 1986
- Recorded: 1967–69, New York City
- Genre: Rock
- Length: 36:21
- Language: English
- Label: Verve
- Producer: The Velvet Underground

The Velvet Underground chronology
VU (1985)	Another View (1986)	Live MCMXCIII (1993)

Another View is a compilation album by the Velvet Underground. It was released in 1986 by Verve Records and is composed of material recorded between 1967 and 1969.

== Composition and collection ==
When the Velvet Underground moved from Verve Records (who had released their first two albums) to parent company MGM Records, they signed a two-album deal, releasing their third album The Velvet Underground in March 1969. Later that same year, however, there was a management change and MGM Records' new CEO, Mike Curb, was brought in to try to rescue the financially struggling label. He decided to purge the record company of its many controversial and unprofitable acts. The band had in the meantime recorded fourteen tracks for possible release as their second MGM album. All of these were shelved and forgotten by their record company until the early 1980s.

In the 1980s, as Verve (by then an imprint of Polygram) prepared to re-release the band's three Verve/MGM albums on vinyl and, for the first time, on CD, they found nineteen previously unreleased tracks: five Cale-era tracks and the fourteen "lost album" tracks, some of them in two-track mixdown format, some of them even on multitracks. Ten of the nineteen tracks were released in February 1985 on VU; the rest remained for the time being in the vaults.

In 1986, Polydor decided to prepare a vinyl box set for European release. Simply titled The Velvet Underground, this box, which was released in June, consisted of the band's first three albums, VU, and an untitled bonus album containing the remaining nine tracks from Polygram's vaults. That untitled album was later separately released on vinyl and CD as Another View.

An acetate-sourced alternative mix of this album's version of "Ride into the Sun", featuring vocals by Lou Reed, has appeared on bootlegs and on the Australian box set What Goes On.

As the Velvet Underground moved from MGM to Atlantic, they re-recorded two of the songs on Another View, "Ride into the Sun" and "Rock and Roll", for possible inclusion on Loaded. Only "Rock and Roll" made the grade, but two of the Another View songs would be recycled by Lou Reed during his early solo career: "Ride into the Sun" (on Lou Reed, 1972) and "We're Gonna Have a Real Good Time Together" (on Street Hassle, 1978).

Professional ratings
Review scores
Source	Rating
AllMusic	3/5 stars
Blender	3/5 stars
Christgau's Record Guide	A−
The Encyclopedia of Popular Music	2/5 stars

== Track listing ==
Side one
No.	Title	Writer(s)	Original Recording Date	Length
1.	"We're Gonna Have a Real Good Time Together"	Lou Reed	September 30, 1969	2:56
2.	"I'm Gonna Move Right In"	Reed, Doug Yule, Sterling Morrison, Maureen Tucker	September 27, 1969	6:30
3.	"Hey Mr. Rain (Version I)"	Reed, John Cale, Morrison, Tucker	May 29, 1968	4:56
4.	"Ride Into the Sun"	Reed, Yule, Morrison, Tucker	September 5, 1969	3:20
5.	"Coney Island Steeplechase"	Reed	May 6, 1969	2:20
Total length:				20:02

Side two
No.	Title	Writer(s)	Original Recording Date	Length
1.	"Guess I'm Falling In Love" (Instrumental version)	Reed, Cale, Morrison, Tucker	December 5, 1967	3:35
2.	"Hey Mr. Rain (Version II)"	Reed, Cale, Morrison, Tucker	May 29, 1968	5:16
3.	"Ferryboat Bill"	Reed	June 19, 1969	2:10
4.	"Rock and Roll"	Reed	June 19, 1969	5:18
Total length:				16:19

== Personnel ==
The Velvet Underground

- John Cale – viola on "Hey Mr. Rain (Version I)" and "Hey Mr. Rain (Version II)", bass guitar on "Guess I'm Falling in Love"
- Sterling Morrison – guitar, backing vocals, bass guitar on "Hey Mr. Rain"
- Lou Reed – vocals, guitar, piano
- Maureen Tucker – percussion
- Doug Yule – bass guitar, keyboards, backing vocals

Technical staff

- The Velvet Underground – producers
- Bill Levenson – executive producer
- J. C. Convertino – engineer
