= 1969: The Velvet Underground Live =

Live album by the Velvet Underground
- Released: September 1974
- Recorded: October 19 and November 25, 1969
- Venue: End of Cole Ave (Dallas, Texas); The Matrix (San Francisco)
- Genre: Rock
- Length: 114:43
- Language: English
- Label: Mercury
- Producer: The Velvet Underground

The Velvet Underground chronology
Squeeze (1973)	1969: The Velvet Underground Live (1974)	VU (1985)

Professional ratings
Review scores
Source	Rating
AllMusic	5/5 stars
Chicago Tribune	4/4 stars
Christgau's Record Guide	A−
The Encyclopedia of Popular Music	3/5 stars
Overdose	B+
The Rolling Stone Album Guide	4/5 stars
Spin Alternative Record Guide	10/10

1969: The Velvet Underground Live is a live album by the Velvet Underground. It was originally released as a double album in September 1974 by Mercury Records. The September 1988 CD re-release was issued as two separate single CD volumes, with one extra track per disc. Since many of the band's studio albums were out of print in the United States from the early 1970s through the mid-1980s, 1969 was one of the more popular albums by the band, and is a fan favorite. Spin magazine's Alternative Record Guide included it in the top 100 alternative albums of all time in 1995.

== Recording and production ==
During 1969, the Velvet Underground toured the United States and Canada, playing well over 70 dates. By this time, the band had picked up a sizeable fan base and every now and then a fan would bring along, with consent of the band, recording equipment to record a set.

Most of the time, this would mean relatively simple hand-held recorders resulting in lo-fi audience recordings. On two occasions, however, professional equipment was used. On October 19, 1969, in the End of Cole Ave. club, Dallas, a fan who happened to be a recording engineer brought along his professional gear; and in November at The Matrix in San Francisco, the band was given permission to use the in-house four-track recording desk.

The band were given two-track mixdown tapes from the recordings for reference, but nothing was done with them until 1974, after the band had dissolved and Lou Reed had become well-known as a solo artist. According to bassist Doug Yule, "The release of 1969 Live... was started by Steve Sesnick [former band manager], who had the tapes and was trying to sell them to get money for himself claiming that he owned the [band] name and the rights to the album... Somehow somebody else got involved and contacted other people in the group and basically Sesnick got done. [Lou Reed's management] took the tapes and said 'It's not yours' and released it".

The mixdown tapes were submitted to Mercury Records, who agreed to release a compilation of the best performances as a double album. The compiling was done by music critic Paul Nelson, who at the time was working at Mercury Records. When 1969 was released, it immediately became subject of a lawsuit as The Matrix's management had never given permission for their material to be used on a commercial release. The matter was settled out of court.

Although four-track recording equipment was used for the album, some of the tracks feature light crackling as they were sourced from acetates, the original tapes having been lost. There is little ambience or audience sound, however, because no audience mic was used and so the only ambience the listener gets is what little the vocal and drum mics picked up.

At the time of the album's release, three of its songs ("We're Gonna Have a Real Good Time Together", "Over You" and "Sweet Bonnie Brown"/"It's Just Too Much") had never been released in any form, two ("Lisa Says" and "Ocean") were previously only known from the versions on Reed's debut solo album, and "New Age" and "Sweet Jane" were different from the eventual Loaded studio versions. In addition, "White Light/White Heat" is extended from two-and-a-half minutes to over eight minutes of guitar improvisation. The album also features songs sung by different singers from the album versions: Reed sings "New Age" (later sung by Yule on Loaded) and "Femme Fatale" (originally sung by Nico) and Yule sings "I'll Be Your Mirror" (also originally by Nico).

The album contained liner notes by Paul Nelson and by singer/songwriter Elliott Murphy. Despite being present in the gatefold photo with Reed, Sterling Morrison and Maureen Tucker at The Factory, John Cale does not feature on the album.

== Track listing ==
=== Original LP ===
All tracks written by Lou Reed.

Side one
No.	Title	Recording date/venue	Length
1.	"I'm Waiting for the Man"	October 19, 1969 at End of Cole Ave., Dallas	7:00
2.	"Lisa Says"	November 27, 1969 at The Matrix, San Francisco (late show)	5:46
3.	"What Goes On"	November 26, 1969 at The Matrix (early show)	8:47
4.	"Sweet Jane"	November 27, 1969 at The Matrix (late show)	3:58

Side two
No.	Title	Recording date/venue	Length
1.	"We're Gonna Have a Real Good Time Together"	November 26, 1969 at The Matrix (early show)	3:12
2.	"Femme Fatale"	October 19, 1969 at End of Cole Ave.	3:01
3.	"New Age"	November 27, 1969 at The Matrix (late show)	6:31
4.	"Rock & Roll"	November 27, 1969 at The Matrix (late show)	6:00
5.	"Beginning to See the Light"	November 27, 1969 at The Matrix (late show)	5:26

Side three
No.	Title	Recording date/venue	Length
1.	"Ocean"	November 27, 1969 at The Matrix (late show)	10:46
2.	"Pale Blue Eyes"	October 19, 1969 at End of Cole Ave.	5:50
3.	"Heroin"	November 26, 1969 at The Matrix (late show)	9:42

Side four
No.	Title	Recording date/venue	Length
1.	"Some Kinda Love"	October 19, 1969 at End of Cole Ave. (intro) + November 26, 1969 at The Matrix (early show)	4:44
2.	"Over You"	November 26, 1969 at The Matrix (early show)	2:15
3.	"Sweet Bonnie Brown" / "It's Just Too Much"	November 26, 1969 at The Matrix (late show)	7:50
4.	"White Light/White Heat"	November 27, 1969 at The Matrix (late show)	8:32
5.	"I'll Be Your Mirror"	October 19, 1969 at End of Cole Ave.	2:17

=== Compact disc ===
Volume one
No.	Title	Recording date/venue	Length
1.	"Waiting for My Man"		7:03
2.	"Lisa Says"		5:52
3.	"What Goes On"		8:55
4.	"Sweet Jane"		4:00
5.	"We're Gonna Have a Real Good Time Together"		3:15
6.	"Femme Fatale"		3:04
7.	"New Age"		6:36
8.	"Rock & Roll"		6:06
9.	"Beginning to See the Light"		5:30
10.	"Heroin" (CD bonus track)	November 27, 1969 at The Matrix (early show)	8:14

Volume two
No.	Title	Recording date/venue	Length
1.	"Ocean"		10:55
2.	"Pale Blue Eyes"		5:51
3.	"Heroin"		9:49
4.	"Some Kinda Love"		4:48
5.	"Over You"		2:17
6.	"Sweet Bonnie Brown" / "It's Just Too Much"		7:55
7.	"White Light/White Heat"		8:35
8.	"I Can't Stand It" (CD bonus track)	November 26, 1969 at The Matrix (late show)	7:51
9.	"I'll Be Your Mirror"		2:21

== Notes on CD releases ==
When issued on CD by PolyGram in 1988, the double album (which always sold for the price of a single album) was split into two budget-priced CDs. As denoted in bold above, each CD contains one previously unreleased bonus track not on the original release.

The complete master tapes for the Matrix shows were rediscovered in the 2010s and have been remixed and remastered as 2015's The Complete Matrix Tapes, which, as implied by the title, features the unexpurgated Matrix recordings over four compact discs.

== Personnel ==
The Velvet Underground

- Sterling Morrison – guitar, vocals
- Lou Reed – vocals, guitar
- Maureen Tucker – percussion
- Doug Yule – bass guitar, organ, vocals
