= VU (album) =

Studio album by the Velvet Underground
- Released: February 2, 1985
- Recorded: 1968–1969
- Studios: A & R and Record Plant, New York City
- Genre: Rock
- Length: 35:16
- Label: Verve
- Producer: The Velvet Underground

The Velvet Underground chronology
1969: The Velvet Underground Live (1974)	VU (1985)	Another View (1986)

Singles from VU
- 1. "Foggy Notion" / "I Can't Stand It" Released: 1984

VU is an album by the American rock band the Velvet Underground, released on February 2, 1985 by Verve Records and consisting of material recorded in 1968 and 1969.

VU has been critically acclaimed both in contemporary and retrospective reviews.

== Background ==
When the Velvet Underground moved from Verve Records (which had released their first two albums) to parent company MGM Records, they signed a two-album deal, releasing their third album The Velvet Underground in March 1969. This was their first record with multi-instrumentalist Doug Yule, who replaced John Cale. Later that year there was a management change and MGM Records' new CEO, Mike Curb, was brought in to try to rescue the financially struggling label. He decided to purge the record company of its unprofitable acts. The Velvet Underground were already inclined to leave the label by then and would later sign with Atlantic Records, which released their fourth studio album, Loaded, in November 1970.

In the meantime, in 1969, the band recorded fourteen tracks for possible release as their second MGM (and fourth overall) album. All of these were shelved and forgotten by the record company until the early 1980s. The band's drummer Moe Tucker later said:

We didn't say we'll just go in and lay down anything and screw 'em. There was a sense that it probably wouldn't be released by them. I think I figured it would just get picked up by the next record company, not realizing that MGM would own it. But when we switched labels, MGM wouldn't give up the tapes.

== Release and contents ==
In the early 1980s, as Verve (by then an imprint of Polygram) prepared to re-release the band's three Verve/MGM albums on vinyl and CD, they found nineteen previously unreleased tracks: five Cale-era tracks and the fourteen "lost album" tracks, some of them in two-track mixdown format, some of them even on multitracks. The cream of the nineteen tracks was released in 1985 as VU; the rest was released as Another View in 1986.

VU is a selection from the 1969 tracks as well as two previously unreleased songs recorded with Cale: "Temptation Inside Your Heart" and "Stephanie Says". Since most of the material was available on multitrack (only "Ocean" is included in its original 1969 mix), engineers were able to clean up and remix the tracks.

As the Velvet Underground moved from MGM to Atlantic, they re-recorded two of the songs on VU ("Ocean" and "I'm Sticking with You") for possible inclusion on Loaded. Neither made the cut, but six of the VU songs were recycled by the band's leader Lou Reed during his solo career: "I Can't Stand It", "Lisa Says" and "Ocean" on his debut album Lou Reed (1972); "Andy's Chest" on Transformer (1972); "Stephanie Says" (as "Caroline Says II") on Berlin (1973), and "She's My Best Friend" (which was originally sung by Doug Yule) on Coney Island Baby (1976).

VU is called a compilation album by some sources, an archival album by other, and a Velvets unofficial studio album ("A Basement Tapes for the '80s") by Robert Christgau. Most avoid classifying the album in any of the mentioned categories. Mark Denning of AllMusic wrote:

No one seems to know if the Velvet Underground were making an album or just cutting demos when they went into the studio in 1969 not long before their contract with MGM Records ran out -- even the members of the band didn't agree on the particulars years after the fact -- but when the tapes were rediscovered in Polygram's vaults in the early '80s, it led to the first major archival release from the Velvets since 1969: Velvet Underground Live, and one that was every bit as important.

VU peaked in the US at number 85 on the Billboard music charts, the band's best placing. As of October 2013, it had sold 90,000 copies according to Nielsen Soundscan.

In 2012, Sundazed Music released a five-LP box titled The Verve/MGM Albums, which contained a 10-track LP titled 1969 and pitched as the unfinished fourth album. In 2017, Universal released a double LP titled 1969 which expanded that 2012 LP into a 20-track collection of mixes and versions.

== Critical reception ==
Professional ratings
Review scores
Source	Rating
AllMusic	5/5 stars
All Music Guide to Popular Music	5/5 stars
Christgau's Record Guide	A
The Encyclopedia of Popular Music	3/5 stars
MusicHound Rock	4/5 stars
Rolling Stone	5/5 stars
The Rolling Stone Album Guide	4/5 stars
Spin Alternative Record Guide	9/10

VU was ranked number 3 among the "Albums of the Year" for 1985 by New Musical Express. In the Pazz & Jop year-end critics poll, it was ranked the 12th best album of 1985. Robert Christgau placed it at number 6 on his "Dean's list" of the best albums of that year.

Village Voice rock critic Robert Christgau wrote, "It's goofy, relaxed, simultaneously conversational and obscure, an effect accentuated by the unfinished feel of takes the band never prepared for public consumption. As a result, especially given PolyGram's state-of-the-art remix, it's their most listenable record." Rolling Stone's David Fricke claimed that "V.U. captures the band at the height of its powers, refining the edginess of the early records with a polished, accessible sound that doesn't compromise its spirit of adventure." Trouser Press called the album "stupendous" and added that its songs "show the Velvet Underground stoking the rock'n'roll fire that blazed forth on Loaded: 'Foggy Notion' is a timeless raveup of classical simplicity".

In a minority opinion, Mick Farren of Spin wrote of the recordings, "As a piece of rock archeology, they are clearly invaluable, filling a crucial gap in the Velvet Underground canon. As a piece of entertainment — even a period piece — they provoke the feeling that, if it had been released in sequence, the album probably would have been greeted as an almost unqualified dog."

In a retrospective review, AllMusic's Mark Demming wrote, "The 1969 recordings on VU rank with some of the most accessible but potent rock & roll the Velvet Underground ever recorded; [...] 'I Can't Stand It,' 'Foggy Notion,' and 'One of These Days' are memorable, punchy rock tunes," and claimed that the music in this album "is a reminder that this band wasn't as alienating as many writers like to suggest; [...] they could also play tough but joyous rock & roll that made people want to dance." Richie Unterberger opined, "Many of the tracks were re-recorded by Reed on his early solo albums, and in every instance, The Velvets' versions are better."

== Track listing ==
All songs written by Lou Reed, except "Foggy Notion" by Reed, Sterling Morrison, Doug Yule, Maureen Tucker and Hy Weiss.

Side one
No.	Title	Recording date	Length
1.	"I Can't Stand It"	May 20, 1969	3:21
2.	"Stephanie Says"	February 13, 1968	2:49
3.	"She's My Best Friend"	May 14, 1969	2:47
4.	"Lisa Says"	October 1, 1969	2:53
5.	"Ocean"	June 19, 1969	5:10
Total length:			17:00

Side two
No.	Title	Recording date	Length
1.	"Foggy Notion"	May 6, 1969	6:41
2.	"Temptation Inside Your Heart"	February 14, 1968	2:30
3.	"One of These Days"	September 23, 1969	3:50
4.	"Andy's Chest"	May 13, 1969	2:49
5.	"I'm Sticking with You"	May 13, 1969	2:26
Total length:			18:16

The CD issue of VU omits the first few seconds of "Foggy Notion", which includes a practice guitar lick and the band members talking.

- All tracks appear on the box set Peel Slowly and See, except "She's My Best Friend", "Ocean" and "Andy's Chest". "Ocean" on Peel Slowly and See is a later version, recorded during the Loaded sessions April–June 1970.

== Personnel ==
The Velvet Underground

- John Cale – viola, celesta and backing vocals on "Stephanie Says", bass guitar and backing vocals on "Temptation Inside Your Heart"
- Sterling Morrison – guitar, backing vocals
- Lou Reed – vocals, guitar
- Maureen Tucker – percussion, lead vocals on "I'm Sticking with You"
- Doug Yule – bass guitar, keyboards, lead vocals on "She's My Best Friend", backing vocals on "I Can't Stand It", "Lisa Says", "Foggy Notion", "One of These Days", "Andy's Chest", piano and backing vocals on "I'm Sticking with You", lead guitar on "One of These Days"

Technical staff

- The Velvet Underground – producer
- Gary Kellgren – engineer
- Bill Levenson – compilation, executive producer

== Charts ==
VU is the Velvet Underground's highest charting album in the US, peaking at number 85 in the US Billboard charts on April 13, 1985. It remained in the Charts for 13 weeks. In the UK album charts, VU peaked at number 47 and stayed on the Top 100 for 4 weeks.
