= Sister Ray =

Song by the Velvet Underground

from the album White Light/White Heat
- Released: January 30, 1968
- Recorded: September 1967
- Studio: Scepter, New York City
- Genre: Garage rock; hard rock; avant-rock; noise rock; proto-punk; psychedelic rock
- Length: 17:29
- Label: Verve
- Composers: Lou Reed; John Cale; Sterling Morrison; Maureen Tucker
- Lyricist: Lou Reed
- Producer: Tom Wilson

"Sister Ray" is a song by American rock band the Velvet Underground from their 1968 album White Light/White Heat. The lyrics are by Lou Reed, with music composed by Reed and bandmates John Cale, Sterling Morrison, and Maureen Tucker.

The lyrics concern drug use, violence, homosexuality, and transvestism. Reed said of the lyrics: "it has eight characters in it and this guy gets killed and nobody does anything. It was built around this story that I wrote about this scene of total debauchery and decay. I like to think of 'Sister Ray' as a transvestite smack dealer. The situation is a bunch of drag queens taking some sailors home with them, shooting up on smack and having this orgy when the police appear." Lou Reed also stated "'Sister Ray' was about a gay dealer".

At 17 minutes and 29 seconds, it is the longest song on White Light/White Heat, taking up most of the second side of the record, as well as the longest song in the Velvet Underground's studio discography.

Rock critic Lester Bangs wrote in 1970, "The early Velvets had the good sense to realize that whatever your capabilities, music with a simple base structure was the best. Thus, 'Sister Ray' evolved from a most basic funk riff seventeen minutes into stark sound structures of incredible complexity."

== Recording ==
"Sister Ray" was recorded in one take. The band agreed to accept whatever faults occurred during recording, resulting in over 17 minutes of improvised material. The song was recorded with Reed on lead vocals and lead guitar, Morrison on rhythm guitar, Tucker on drums, and Cale on a Vox Continental organ routed through a distorted guitar amplifier. Morrison remarked that he was amazed at the volume of Cale's organ during the recording and that he had switched the guitar pickup on his Fender Stratocaster from the bridge position to the neck position to get "more oomph". The song has no bass guitar. The band had a sponsorship from Vox amplifiers, which allowed them use of the Continental and top-of-the-line amplifiers and distortion pedals.

Reed wrote the song on a train going to New York from Connecticut. After the opening sequence, which is a Mixolydian I-♭VII-IV G-F-C chord progression, much of the song is led by Cale and Reed exchanging percussive chords and noise for over ten minutes. Reed recalled that recording engineer Gary Kellgren walked out while recording the song: "The engineer said, 'I don't have to listen to this. I'll put it in record, and then I'm leaving. When you're done, come get me.'"

== Personnel ==
- Lou Reed – vocals, electric guitar
- John Cale – Vox Continental organ
- Sterling Morrison – Fender Stratocaster electric guitar
- Maureen Tucker – percussion

== Live versions ==
"Sister Ray" was a concert favorite of the band, who regularly closed their set with the song. The triple live album Bootleg Series Volume 1: The Quine Tapes, released in 2001, features three live performances of "Sister Ray" from 1969, with approximate running times of 24, 38 and 29 minutes. The band also had an intro entitled "Sweet Sister Ray" that they would perform occasionally. On the single known recording of this intro (recorded during the April 30, 1968 show, without the complete subsequent performance of "Sister Ray"), "Sweet Sister Ray" alone lasts for over 38 minutes.

== Cover versions ==
- Jonathan Richman plays a portion of "Sister Ray" on his song "Velvet Underground." It has been argued that Richman's band the Modern Lovers' 1976 song "Roadrunner" (co-produced by Cale) is largely a reworking of "Sister Ray" in musical terms.
- Joy Division played a shortened version of the song at the Moonlight Club in London on April 2, 1980, a recording of which appears on their 1981 compilation album Still. Joy Division's successor band New Order played a much-reworked version of the song - with different lyrics - at the Glastonbury Festival 1987.
- The Sisters of Mercy regularly perform the song live.
