= Rock & Roll (The Velvet Underground song) =

1973 single by the Velvet Underground

Single by the Velvet Underground

from the album Loaded
- A-side: "Sweet Jane"
- Released: August 1973
- Recorded: April 15, 1970
- Genre: Proto-punk; rock
- Length: 4:47
- Label: Atlantic
- Songwriter: Lou Reed
- Producers: Geoff Haslam; Shel Kagan; The Velvet Underground

"Rock & Roll" (sometimes spelled Rock 'n' Roll) is a song by the Velvet Underground, originally appearing on their 1970 album Loaded. The song was written by the Velvets' leader Lou Reed, who continued to incorporate the song into his own live performances years later as a solo artist. The song has been recorded multiple times by other artists.

== Velvet Underground version (Original) ==
=== Background ===
The song recounts the advent of rock and roll music, telling the story of a girl named Jenny whose "...life was saved by rock 'n' roll."

In the liner notes to the Velvet Underground's box set Peel Slowly and See, Lou Reed wrote, "'Rock and Roll' is about me. If I hadn't heard rock and roll on the radio, I would have had no idea there was life on this planet. Which would have been devastating - to think that everything, everywhere was like it was where I come from. That would have been profoundly discouraging. Movies didn't do it for me. TV didn't do it for me. It was the radio that did it."

=== Personnel ===
- Lou Reed - vocals, guitars
- Doug Yule - bass guitar, drums, keyboards, vocals
- Sterling Morrison - guitars

=== Other appearances ===
The song also appears on the albums 1969: The Velvet Underground Live; Live MCMXCIII; Loaded: Fully Loaded Edition; American Poet; Another View; Rock 'n' Roll Animal; Live in Italy; Rock and Roll: an Introduction to The Velvet Underground.; Rock and Roll Diary: 1967–1980.

== Detroit version ==
"Rock 'N' Roll"

Song by Detroit featuring Mitch Ryder

from the album Detroit
- A-side: "Rock 'N' Roll"
- B-side: "Box of Old Roses"
- Released: 1971
- Length: 3:38
- Label: Paramount 0133
- Composer: Lou Reed
- Producer: Bob (Boy Wonder) Ezrin

USA chronology
"It Ain't Easy" (1971)	"Rock 'N' Roll" (1971)	"Oo La La La Dee Da Doo" (1972)

Mitch Ryder's band Detroit, which featured Lou Reed's future guitarist Steve Hunter, performed one of the first cover versions of the song in 1971, changing the lyric "New York station" to "Detroit station".

=== Background ===
The group recorded the song "Rock 'N' Roll". It was backed with "Box of Old Roses" and released on Paramount 0133.

=== Reception ===
For the week of 11 December 1971, the group's single "Rock 'n' Roll" was reviewed in the Cash Box Choice Programming section. The reviewer called the single potent stuff and said that it had Top 40 FM interest.

=== Charts ===
==== Cash Box ====
With Detroit's self-titled album debuted having debuted at no. 150 on the Cash Box Top Albums chart, 101 - 150 section the previous week,. their single, "Rock 'n' Roll" made its debut at no. 24 in the Cash Box Looking Ahead chart for the week of 18 December. By 25 December it was at no. 27. At the time, the songs were numbered from 1 - 30. For the week of 1 January 1972, the song was at no. 115 and the songs were listed from 101 - 120. The following week, with the songs listed from 101 - 126, "Rock 'n' Roll" was at no. 107. For the week of 15 January, the single reached no. 105 on the Looking Ahead chart. It then debuted at no. 97 on the Cash Box Top 100 for the week of 22 January. The single peaked at no. 95 for the week of 29 January.

==== Billboard ====
The single also made it no. 107 on the Billboard chart.

== Other notable covers and pop culture uses ==
Other artists to cover the song include The Runaways, changing the aforementioned lyric to "L.A. station". The band Jane's Addiction, though also from Los Angeles, uses Reed's original "New York station" in its cover version of the song.

"Rock & Roll" has appeared in a number of films, including A Guide to Recognizing Your Saints, Rock 'n' Roll High School and SLC Punk!

A clip of the Velvet Underground performing the song is played on completion of the Rock & Roll wonder in Civilization IV. In addition, the quote about researching the technology "Radio," read by Leonard Nimoy, is "...then one fine morning she puts on a New York station.... You know, her life was saved by rock & roll." The quote is credited to Lou Reed.
