= Pale Blue Eyes =

Song by The Velvet Underground

from the album The Velvet Underground
- Released: March 1969
- Recorded: November–December 1968; T.T.G. Studios, Hollywood
- Genre: Folk rock; pop; country
- Length: 5:40
- Label: MGM
- Songwriter: Lou Reed
- Producer: The Velvet Underground

"Pale Blue Eyes" is a song by American rock band the Velvet Underground, written and sung by Lou Reed. He recorded a demo with John Cale in May 1965. It was included on the band's 1969 album The Velvet Underground.

Despite the name, "Pale Blue Eyes" was written about someone whose eyes were hazel, as Reed notes in his book Between Thought and Expression. The song is said to have been inspired by Shelley Albin, Reed's first love, who at the time was married to another man.

== Personnel ==
- Lou Reed – vocals, rhythm guitar
- Sterling Morrison – lead guitar
- Doug Yule – bass guitar, Hammond organ
- Maureen Tucker – tambourine

== Notable cover versions ==
"Pale Blue Eyes" has been covered by a number of artists in addition to Lou Reed and Maureen Tucker from the Velvet Underground:

- Patti Smith performed the song live in the mid- to late-1970s
- Edwyn Collins recorded the song with Paul Quinn and released it as a single in 1984.
- R.E.M. covered the song for the B-side of the single of "So. Central Rain", released in 1984 and collected on their 1987 album Dead Letter Office.
- Marisa Monte has a cover of the song on her 1994 album Verde, Anil, Amarelo, Cor de Rosa e Carvão (a.k.a. Rose and Charcoal).
- Hole covered the song live at the Whisky a Go Go in February 1992, and frontwoman Courtney Love introduced it as "the original new waver". Hole's version included lyrically altered verses but retained the chorus lyrics and chord progression. The recording eventually ended up on the band's first EP, Ask for It (1995).
- Alejandro Escovedo includes a live cover of the song—a duet with Kelly Hogan—on his 1999 release Bourbonitis Blues.
- Counting Crows covered the song several times at live shows in 2003 and later.
- The Kills recorded the song in 2010, releasing it as a B-side in early 2012.

== In popular culture ==
An instrumental version of the song was used in Julian Schnabel's 2007 film The Diving Bell and the Butterfly. The song was also used in a scene of the 2008 film August, as well as 2009's Adventureland, the 2000 film The Vertical Ray of the Sun, the 2015 film Regular Show: The Movie, and the 2023 film Perfect Days.

The song drives the plot in the 1997 South Korean romance film The Contact, in which a radio DJ receives an anonymous package containing the album The Velvet Underground and plays "Pale Blue Eyes," hoping to reconnect with his former lover.

The song and the LP version of the album were both featured in an episode of the 2009-2010 South Korean sitcom High Kick Through the Roof. The characters Shin Sekyung (Shin Se-kyung) and Lee Jihoon (Daniel Choi) listened to the song a number of times in a record bar and a cafe which Jihoon had often frequented as a college student. Later, Sekyung purchased the record as a souvenir; in a subsequent episode, she gave the record to Jihoon as a birthday gift.

The original song was featured during the final scenes of the January 25, 2009 episode of Cold Case (CBS) entitled "The Brush Man". This program regularly features music popular during the time when the cold case being investigated had occurred. Although the murder in this episode occurred in 1967, "Pale Blue Eyes" was recorded in 1969. The song was also featured in episodes of Crossing Jordan, Fringe and The Deuce.

The Killers paid tribute to Lou Reed on the day of his death by performing this song at the inaugural Life Is Beautiful Music & Art Festival in Las Vegas.

Aziz Ansari used the song in his 2019 Netflix stand-up comedy special Aziz Ansari: Right Now.

The song was featured in the third episode of the second season of Netflix series Sex Education.
