= What Goes On (Velvet Underground song) =

Single by The Velvet Underground

from the album The Velvet Underground
- B-side: "Jesus"
- Released: March 1969
- Recorded: November–December 1968
- Studio: TTG Studios, Hollywood
- Genre: Rock; pop
- Length: 4:55
- Label: MGM
- Songwriter: Lou Reed
- Producer: The Velvet Underground

The Velvet Underground singles chronology
"White Light/White Heat" (1968)	"What Goes On" (1969)	"Who Loves The Sun" (1971)

"What Goes On" is a song by the Velvet Underground. It was the only single released from their third studio album, The Velvet Underground (1969).

The song was recorded in 1968 at TTG Studios in Hollywood.

A concert performance of the song, with Doug Yule on keyboards, was included on their double live album 1969: The Velvet Underground Live.

== Personnel ==
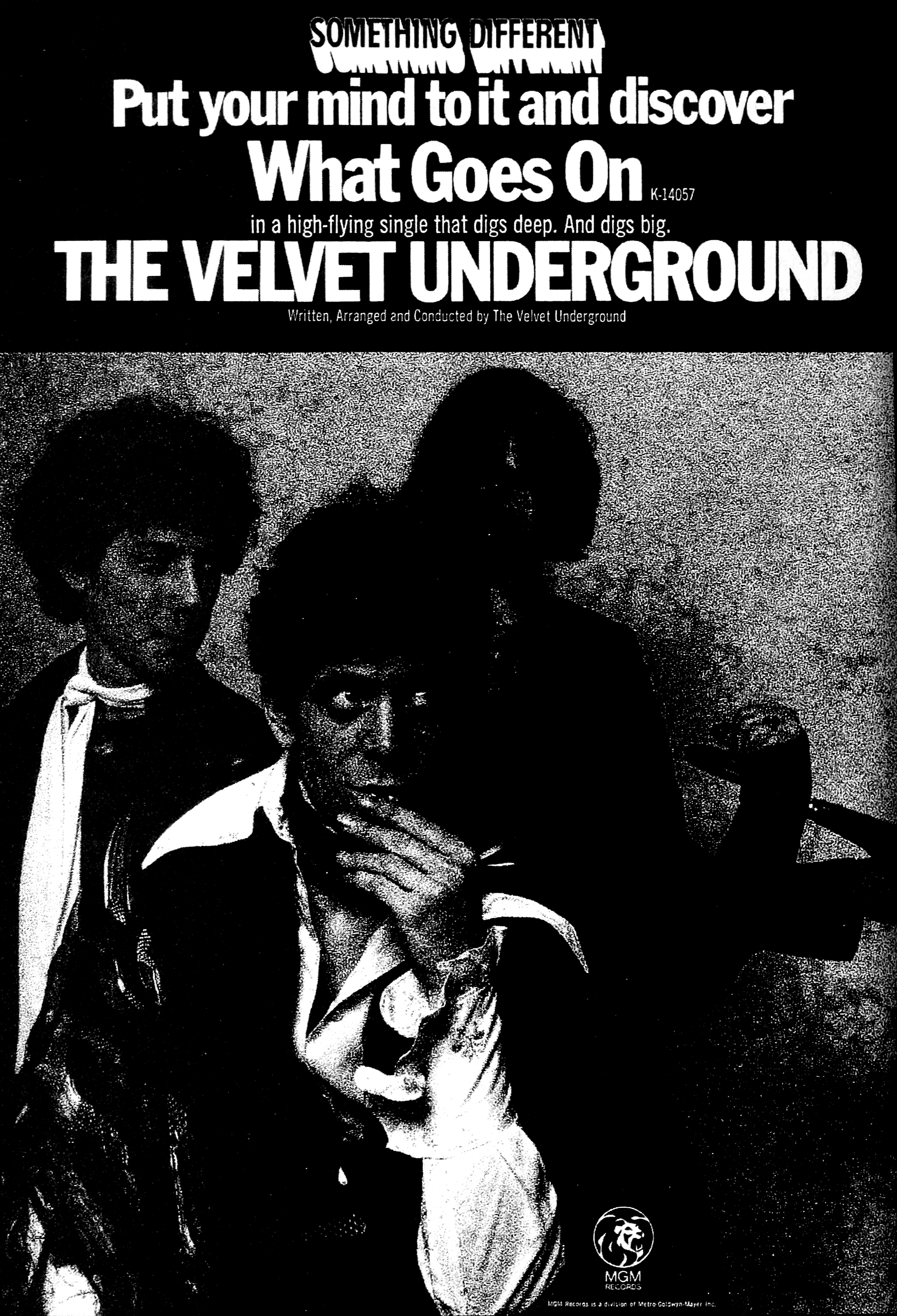
Yule, Morrison (back) and Reed (front) in a magazine advertisement for the single

- Lou Reed – lead vocals, multi-tracked electric and acoustic guitars (including solo)
- Doug Yule – bass, organ, backing vocals
- Sterling Morrison – multi-tracked electric guitars (including solo)
- Maureen Tucker – drums

== Other media ==
The "What Goes On" organ riff was used in the Talking Heads song "Once in a Lifetime," featured on their 1980 album Remain in Light.

In 1978, aficionados Mike "MC" Kostek and Phil Milstein started the Velvet Underground Appreciation Society, which collected, cataloged and made available various rarities. They published a fanzine titled "What Goes On", and later on a newsletter titled "What Goes On Jr."
