= White Light/White Heat (song) =

1968 single by the Velvet Underground

Single by the Velvet Underground

from the album White Light/White Heat
- B-side: "Here She Comes Now"
- Released: November 1967
- Recorded: September 1967
- Studio: Scepter Studios (New York City)
- Genre: Proto-punk
- Length: 2:47
- Label: Verve
- Songwriter: Lou Reed
- Producer: Tom Wilson

The Velvet Underground singles chronology
"Sunday Morning" / "Femme Fatale" (1966)	"White Light/White Heat" / "Here She Comes Now" (1967)	"What Goes On" / "Jesus" (1969)

Audio sample
- 15 seconds of intro: file; help

"White Light/White Heat" is a song recorded by the American rock band the Velvet Underground. It was released as a single in late November 1967 with the B-side "Here She Comes Now". The following year it appeared as the title track on their second studio album of the same name.

== Background ==
"White Light/White Heat" was recorded in the course of the recording sessions for White Light/White Heat in September 1967 at Scepter Studios in Manhattan. The song's vocals are performed primarily by Lou Reed, with John Cale and Sterling Morrison performing backing vocals. The song, much like "I'm Waiting for the Man", features a rock 'n' roll barrelhouse-style piano vamp. The song is about the sensations produced by intravenous injection of amphetamine and features a heavily distorted electric bass outro played by John Cale over a single chord.

"White Light/White Heat" was also a staple of the Velvet Underground's live performances from 1967 on. The tune appears on numerous live bootleg albums, and is included in a nearly nine-minute version on the group's posthumous 1969 Live double LP. Reed also recorded a live version of the song in 1974, which featured on his Rock 'n' Roll Animal and Greatest Hits albums. Reed went on to perform the song with several notable musicians, including David Bowie, Metallica and the Raconteurs.

The Guardian and Paste both ranked the song number seven on their lists of the greatest Velvet Underground songs.

== In popular culture ==
Two traditional-music influenced versions of the song were included on the soundtrack to the 2012 film Lawless, one by The Bootleggers featuring Mark Lanegan and one by bluegrass musician Ralph Stanley.

The live version of the song from Reed's Rock 'n' Roll Animal was specially covered by Julian Casablancas for the HBO television series Vinyl. It appeared on the soundtrack of the fifth episode, during a flashback to a fictional Reed gig in 1973. The song has also been covered by Mick Ronson.

== Personnel ==
- Lou Reed – lead vocals, rhythm guitar, piano
- John Cale – fuzz bass, backing vocals
- Sterling Morrison – lead guitar, backing vocals
- Maureen Tucker – percussion

== David Bowie version ==
"White Light/White Heat"

Single by David Bowie

from the album Ziggy Stardust: The Motion Picture
- B-side: "Cracked Actor"
- Released: October 1983
- Recorded: 3 July 1973
- Venue: Hammersmith Odeon (London)
- Genre: Glam rock
- Length: 3:55
- Label: RCA
- Songwriter: Lou Reed
- Producers: David Bowie; Tony Visconti

David Bowie singles chronology
"Without You" (1983)	"White Light/White Heat" (1983)	"Blue Jean" (1984)

The song was regularly performed live by David Bowie. A version he recorded in 1973 was released as a single in 1983 to promote the album Ziggy Stardust: The Motion Picture.

Bowie, a long-time Velvets fan, had been performing "White Light/White Heat" since 1971. (His album of that year, Hunky Dory, features a credit to the song for having inspired Bowie's "Queen Bitch"). It had featured throughout the Ziggy Stardust Tour (including a performance with Lou Reed on July 8, 1972), been recorded by Bowie for two BBC sessions, and been slated for inclusion on Pin Ups (the backing track from this session was later recorded as a solo version by Mick Ronson in 1975). Despite this, the Ziggy Stardust – The Motion Picture project would be the first time the song had been issued on a Bowie record, and as such it was released as a single.

With Bowie at the peak of his global stardom thanks to Let's Dance, "White Light/White Heat" was considered an unusual turn for the pop audience he had attracted, and reached only #46 in the UK. Bowie performed the song during his 1987 Glass Spider Tour, a live version of which was released in 1988 (re-released in 2007) on Glass Spider. The song continued to feature in Bowie's live repertoire throughout his career.
