= Billy Gilman discography =

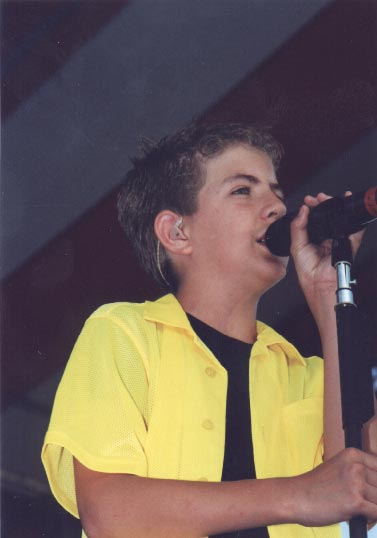
- Billy Gilman at a Boston concert in 2000.
- Studio albums: 6
- EPs: 2
- Compilation albums: 2
- Singles: 36
- Music videos: 12

American singer Billy Gilman has released six studio albums, two compilation album, 36 singles, and 12 music videos, as well as other charted songs and non-album releases.

== Albums ==
=== Studio albums ===
List of albums, with selected chart positions and certifications
Title	Album details	Peak chart positions						Certifications (sales threshold)
Title	Album details	US	US Country	US Holiday	US Indie	AUS	CAN Country	Certifications (sales threshold)
One Voice	Released: June 20, 2000; Label: Epic Nashville; Format: CD, cassette	22	2	—	—	77	6	RIAA: 2× Platinum; MC: Gold
Classic Christmas	Release: October 17, 2000; Label: Epic Nashville; Format: CD, cassette	42	4	5	—	—	—	RIAA: Gold
Dare to Dream	Released: May 8, 2001; Label: Epic Nashville; Format: CD, cassette	45	6	—	—	—	—	RIAA: Gold
Music Through Heartsongs	Released: April 15, 2003; Label: Epic Nashville; Format: CD, cassette	109	15	—	—	—	—	
Everything and More	Released: May 3, 2005; Label: Image Entertainment; Format: CD	—	39	—	17	—	—	
Billy Gilman	Released: September 6, 2006; Label: Image Entertainment; Format: CD	—	55	—	29	—	—	
"—" denotes a recording that did not chart or was not released in that territory.

=== Compilation albums ===
List of compilation albums
Title	Album details
My Time on Earth	Released: August 2, 2007; Label: Sony BMG Music Entertainment Custom Marketing Group; Format: CD

=== Extended plays ===
List of extended plays and tracklists
Title
Album details
Track listing
Christmas Memories
- Released: 2017
- Label: (independent)
- Format: CD

No.	Title	Length
1.	"Silent Night"
2.	"Christmas Memories"
3.	"A Christmas Love Song"
4.	"Jingle Bells"
5.	"Have Yourself a Merry Little Christmas"

Delta Queen
- Released: August 29, 2025
- Label: Pinecastle
- Format: Digital download, streaming

No.	Title	Length
1.	"Roller Coaster"	3:02
2.	"Delta Queen"	3:54
3.	"That's Bluegrass to Me" (featuring Rhonda Vincent)	3:31
4.	"Waylon"	3:24
5.	"Til You Come Home"	3:41

== Singles ==
=== As lead artist ===
List of singles, with select chart positions, showing album and year released
Title	Year	Peak chart positions					Album
Title	Year	US	US Country	US AC	CAN Country	UK	Album
"One Voice"	2000	38	20	29	23	80	One Voice
"Oklahoma"	2000	63	33	—	—	—	One Voice
"Warm and Fuzzy"	2000	—	50	—	—	—	Classic Christmas
"There's a Hero"	2001	—	—	—	—	—	One Voice
"She's My Girl"	2001	—	50	—	—	—	Dare to Dream
"Elisabeth"	2001	—	56	—	—	—	Dare to Dream
"Everything and More"	2005	—	—	—	—	—	Everything and More
"Hey, Little Suzie (The Cause of All That)"	2005	—	—	—	—	—	Everything and More
"Gonna Find Love"	2006	—	—	—	—	—	Billy Gilman
"Southern Star"	2006	—	—	—	—	—	Billy Gilman
"I'll Be Home for Christmas"	2006	—	—	—	—	—	Non-album singles
"Crying"	2008	—	—	—	—	—	Non-album singles
"When You Come Home"	2008	—	—	—	—	—	Non-album singles
"The Choice" (Billy Gilman & Friends)	2012	—	—	—	—	—	Non-album singles
"Say You Will" (Note: A "Pop Version" of "Say You Will" was released in 2015".)	2014	—	—	—	—	—	Non-album singles
"Christmas Time"	2015	—	—	—	—	—	Non-album singles
"He's Alive"	2015	—	—	—	—	—	Non-album singles
"Falling"	2015	—	—	—	—	—	Non-album singles
"Wishing You Were Here" (Note: A "Radio Mix" of "Wishing You Were Here" was released in 2020.)	2015	—	—	—	—	—	Non-album singles
"Summertime"	2015	—	—	—	—	—	Non-album singles
"Girl It's You"	2016	—	—	—	—	—	Non-album singles
"Get It Got It Good"	2017	—	—	—	—	—	Non-album singles
"Soldier"	2019	—	—	—	—	—	Non-album singles
"One Voice" (with Home Free)	2021	—	—	—	—	—	Non-album singles
"Roller Coaster"	2023	—	—	—	—	—	Delta Queen
"Delta Queen"	2023	—	—	—	—	—	Delta Queen
"That's Bluegrass to Me" (featuring Rhonda Vincent)	2024	—	—	—	—	—	Delta Queen
"Til You Come Home"	2024	—	—	—	—	—	Delta Queen
"Waylon"	2025	—	—	—	—	—	Delta Queen
"—" denotes a recording that did not chart or was not released in that territory.

=== As featured artist ===
List of singles, with select chart positions, showing album and year released
Title	Year	Album
"Dream a Dream" (Charlotte Church with Billy Gilman)	2000	Dream a Dream
"COVID-19 Blues" (Melissa Manchester, Tony Orlando, and Deborah Silver featuring various artists (Note: Tiny Tavares, Billy Gilman, Sharpe Family Singers, Danny Bacher, Shaun T. Evans, Dennis Lambert, Landau Eugene Murphy, Jr., Chubby Tavares, Casey Abrams, Siedah Garrett, N'kenge, Daniel Emmet, Susan Anton, Allan Harris, Bernard Fowler, Tom Wopat, J.D. Nicholas, Luba Mason, Nita Whitaker, Lisa Fischer, Melissa Errico, Wendy Pedersen, and Ralph Tavares))	2021	Non-album single

=== Promotional singles ===
- "I Know" (MySpace, 2009)
- "She Wanted More" (MySpace, 2009)
- "Honky Tonk Parade" (MySpace, 2009)
- "I've Changed" (MySpace, 2009)
- "Red to Blue" (YouTube, 2016)

== Releases from The Voice ==
=== Compilation albums ===
Title	Album details	Peak chart positions
Title	Album details	US
The Complete Season 11 Collection (The Voice Performances)	Released: December 13, 2016; Label: Republic; Format: Digital download, streaming	77

=== Singles ===
Title	Year	Peak positions			
Title	Year	US Bubb.	US Country	US Digital	US Rock
"When We Were Young"	2016	—	—	— (Note: "When We Were Young" did not enter the Billboard Digital Songs chart, but did peak at number 26 on the Pop Digital Song Sales chart.)	—
"Man in the Mirror" (with Andrew DeMuro)	2016	—	—	—	—
"Fight Song"	2016	—	—	—	—
"Crying"	2016	—	—	— (Note: "Crying" did not enter the Billboard Digital Songs chart, but did peak at number 48 on the Pop Digital Song Sales chart.)	—
"The Show Must Go On"	2016	—	—	—	41
"All I Ask"	2016	—	—	— (Note: "All I Ask" did not enter the Billboard Digital Songs chart, but did peak at number 24 on the Pop Digital Song Sales chart.)	—
"Anyway"	2016	—	29	25	—
"I Surrender"	2016	—	—	23	—
"My Way"	2016	5	—	14	—
"Bye Bye Love" (with Adam Levine)	2016	—	—	—	—
"Because of Me"	2016	6	—	15	—
"—" denotes a recording that failed to chart or was ineligible for that format.

== Music videos ==
Title	Year	Director
"One Voice"	2000	Trey Fanjoy
"Oklahoma"	2000	Trey Fanjoy
"Warm and Fuzzy"	2000	David McClister
"There's a Hero"	2001	Brent Hedgecock
"She's My Girl"	2001	Brent Hedgecock
"Elisabeth"	2001	Shaun Silva
"I Am (Shades of Life)"	2003	
"Everything and More"	2005	Alec Asten
"Hey, Little Suzie (The Cause of All That)"	2005	Alec Asten
"The Choice"	2012	Sean Thomas
"Say You Will" (Pop Version)	2015	Alec Asten
"Red to Blue"	2016	
"Because of Me"	2016	
