= In Between (The Feelies album) =

Studio album by the Feelies
- Released: February 24, 2017
- Recorded: Late 2014 to 2016
- Studio: Boat, North Haledon, New Jersey, US; House of Monk
- Length: 43:24
- Language: English
- Label: Bar/None
- Producer: Bill Million

The Feelies chronology
| Uncovered (2016) | In Between (2017) | Some Kinda Love: Performing the Music of The Velvet Underground (2023) |

"I have hearing problems, so I'm drawn more to quieter music now. The songs seemed to require that approach but that also stemmed from the demos we made. We liked the feel and that inspired us to record at my place. We really wanted to get the same feel from those sessions onto the record. Part of it's the technique and part of it's the vibe of being in a room you're familiar with. We've rehearsed here since the late '80s, so we're not looking at the clock, thinking, 'Oh, we just spent $100 just working on this one part.'"

—Feelies' guitarist and vocalist Glenn Mercer on differences recording In Between versus the band's earliest output

In Between is the sixth studio album by American alternative rock band the Feelies. It has received positive reviews from critics.

== Reception ==
According to the review aggregator Metacritic, In Between received "generally favorable reviews" based on a weighted average score of 80 out of 100 from 13 critic scores. Editors at AllMusic rated this album 3.5 out of 5 stars, with critic Mark Deming writing that this album "dials back a bit on the tempos as well as the electric guitars" with more subdued music than the band's late 1980s and early 1990s work, but continued that "it's never cautious; this is very much the work of one of America's best and most venerable independent bands, and it confirms the Feelies are still a genuine creative force as they approach their 40th anniversary". Greg Kot of the Chicago Tribune stated that the band "finds the sweet spot between tranquillity and propulsion" on this release and that they sound "focused on moving ahead, ever in between stations". Classic Rock's Julian Marszalek scored In Between 4 out of 5 stars, declaring it a career-best for the musicians whose "grip of melody remains very much in place throughout, as do their love of jangling intertwining guitars and a strict sense of rhythm". In the Los Angeles Times, Randall Roberts emphasized the continuity between this music and the band's earlier work, stating, "like most of their songs, the new ones are fueled by seemingly simple but absolutely engaging riff-based melodies, which launch from the starting gates like thoroughbreds at the Derby and run with focused power".

Juan Edgardo Rodríguez of No Ripcord gave this album a 7 out of 10, for music that is "as unassuming as it is stubbornly unchangeable" with "mantric strums with casual but also demanding arrangements". Editors at Pitchfork scored this release 8.0 out of 10 and critic Marc Masters praised it for being "both mellow and intense in ways only the Feelies can pull off". At PopMatters, Ed Whitlock gave In Between an 8 out of 10, calling it a testament to "strict adherence to a framework to reveal the deepest levels of creativity and mastery of vision" with the interplay of the band members, with specific praise for each. In The Skinny, Andrew Gordon rated this work 3 out of 5 stars and called it more subdued than the band's previous work and drew comparisons to their 1986 album The Good Earth, as well as fellow New Jersey–based indie rock bands Real Estate and Yo La Tengo. In Between received 7.5 out of 10 stars in Under the Radar, where Matthew Berlyant called it "a complete beauty", making "another gem" in the band's "flawless discography". Jim DeRogatis of WBEZ-FM praised the "irresistible forward propulsion of the slightly syncopated twist that [percussionist Dave] Weckerman, drummer Stan Demeski, and bassist Brenda Sauter put on their Bo Diddley-via-the Velvet Underground grooves, combined with Bill Million’s relentless rhythm guitar and Glenn Mercer’s harmonic decorations and occasional lead-guitar eruptions" stating that the band's sound is the same as it has been for decades, but that is a good thing and they remain "undiminished, as fresh and undeniable today as they were" in their early career.

== Track listing ==
All songs written by Glenn Mercer, except where noted.

1. "In Between" – 3:55
2. "Turn Back Time" (Glenn Mercer and Bill Million) – 2:11
3. "Stay the Course" (Mercer and Million) – 4:01
4. "Flag Days" – 4:04
5. "Pass the Time" (Mercer and Million) – 2:36
6. "When to Go" – 3:36
7. "Been Replaced" – 3:09
8. "Gone Gone Gone" (Mercer and Million) – 3:43
9. "Time Will Tell" (Mercer and Million) – 4:07
10. "Make It Clear" – 2:35
11. "In Between (Reprise)" – 9:22

== Personnel ==
The Feelies

- Stan Demeski – drums, percussion
- Glenn Mercer – guitars, keyboards, percussion, vocals, production, design
- Bill Million – guitars, percussion, backing vocals, audio engineering, production
- Brenda Sauter – bass guitar, backing vocals
- Dave Weckerman – percussion, backing vocals

Additional personnel

- Scott Anthony – audio mastering at Storybook Sound, Maplewood, New Jersey, United States
- John Baumgartner – photography, design
- Chris Flach – photography
- Dan Francia – engineering

== See also ==
- 2017 in American music
- List of 2017 albums
