= Time for a Witness =

Studio album by the Feelies
- Released: 1991
- Recorded: October 29 – December 19, 1990
- Genre: Rock, college rock
- Length: 42:04
- Label: A&M/Coyote
- Producer: Bill Million, Gary Smith, Glenn Mercer

The Feelies chronology
Only Life (1988)	Time for a Witness (1991)	Here Before (2011)

Time for a Witness is the fourth studio album by the American rock band the Feelies, released in 1991 on A&M/Coyote. The band supported the album with a North American tour.

== Production ==
Most of the lyrics were written by Glenn Mercer. The album was coproduced by Gary Smith. The band would tape their rehearsals and look for interesting parts in the jams. "What She Said" uses harmonica and slide guitar. "Real Cool Time" is a cover of the Stooges song.

== Critical reception ==
Professional ratings
Review scores
Source	Rating
AllMusic	3.5/5 stars
Calgary Herald	A−
Chicago Tribune	3/4 stars
Robert Christgau	A
The Encyclopedia of Popular Music	3/5 stars
Entertainment Weekly	B
Orlando Sentinel	5/5 stars
Pitchfork	7.9/10
Rolling Stone	4/5 stars
Spin Alternative Record Guide	7/10

The Chicago Tribune wrote that "guitar lines become modal-jazz arabesques, dissolve into dissonance, then finally return to some vigorous variation of the three-chord strum, while the rhythm section builds a mantra-like momentum." The Calgary Herald deemed the album "melodic mood pieces from the musical children of Lou Reed wrapped in fragile swirls of electric sound and lit by the neon's red glare." The Washington Post concluded: "Such tracks as 'Sooner or Later' and 'Doin' It Again' offer as many twangy thrills as a great Rolling Stones song, but the Feelies don't pretend that their guitars express passion or rage or fear. Their guitars express guitars."

The Toronto Star determined that "Mercer and fellow guitarist Bill Million build dense, unrelenting guitar textures shot through with simple solo lines." The New York Times called Time for a Witness "a musically austere record in which the guitars of Mr. Million and Glenn Mercer, the band's lead singer and lyricist, interlock eloquently."

== Track listing ==
All tracks are written by Bill Million and Glenn Mercer except where noted.

No.	Title	Writer(s)	Length
1.	"Waiting"		3:36
2.	"Time for a Witness"		3:34
3.	"Sooner or Later"		2:33
4.	"Find a Way"		7:01
5.	"Decide"		4:51
6.	"Doin' It Again"		2:41
7.	"Invitation"		3:00
8.	"For Now"		4:47
9.	"What She Said"		5:38
10.	"Real Cool Time"	Dave Alexander, Ron Asheton, Scott Asheton, Iggy Pop	4:23
Total length:			42:04

== Personnel ==
- Glenn Mercer – guitar, vocals
- Bill Million – guitar, vocals
- Dave Weckerman – percussion
- Brenda Sauter – bass, vocals
- Stan Demeski – drums
