= Here Before =

Here Before may refer to:

- Here Before (album), a 2011 album by the Feelies
- Here Before (film), a 2021 British thriller film directed by Stacey Gregg
- "Here Before", a song from Vashti Bunyan's album Lookaftering
  - "Here Before", a cover of Vashti Bunyan's song which was included on Fever Ray's 2009 self-titled album
