= Mirabelle Morah =

Mirabelle Morah is a social entrepreneur and the founder of BlankPaperz Media, a digital publishing platform. Morah was a panelist at the 2019 and 2020 Social Enterprise World Forum where she spoke on "Innovation in Youth Engagement," and "Building Youth Movements." She is also a recipient of Her Network Woman of the Future Award.

== Early life ==
Morah grew up in Calabar, Cross River State of Nigeria. After her secondary school, she joined a Christian youth fellowship that emphasized on leadership, personal development and societal good. She started volunteering for community service from then and continued volunteering through her university period.

== Career ==
In April 2016 she founded BlankPaperz Media, an online publishing platform. By 2020, the platform has had more than 170 contributors from 12 countries who publish their works or are featured on BlankPaperz online publications. The platform is also used to organise training, workshops and similar event for young people, at the community level. She is the editor-in-chief of BlankPaperz. In January 2017, she was made the Head of Operations of the Calabar Youth Council for Women Rights (CYCWR), a non-profit organisation based in Calabar, Cross River State, Nigeria. She was also awarded a scholarship to participate in the Study of the United States Institutes (SUSI) for Student Leaders programme of 2017. The programme was carried out at California State University and she studied social entrepreneurship, civic engagement and leadership skills. She participated in the British Council’s Study UK Exhibition 2018 Video Challenge and won. She was therefore offered a study trip to the University of Gloucestershire in the UK, on Media & Journalism.

In 2018 she was selected as one of the 33 Global Teen Leaders by We Are Family Foundation for her contributions to peace and education. She was also honoured as an Ashoka Changemaker and Ashoka Africa Youth Champion. Morah studied English and Literary Studies at the University of Calabar, Nigeria. When she graduated in 2019, she travelled to Austria in the summer of 2019, to work with the marketing and communications team of Salzburg Global Seminar as an intern. She was also made a Nigerian country representative for a Chatham House (The Royal Institute of International Affairs) Common Futures Conversations Platform which has its focus on fostering key policy dialogue between youths in Africa and Europe.

== Award ==
- Her Network Woman of the Future Award 2018

== Book publication ==
- Oh Beautiful Africa!
