= Everybody's Got Something to Hide Except Me and My Monkey =

- Cover of the Maclen Music sheet music

Song by the Beatles

from the album The Beatles
- Released: 22 November 1968
- Recorded: 27 June and 1, 23 July 1968
- Studio: EMI, London
- Genre: Hard rock; rock and roll
- Length: 2:24
- Label: Apple
- Songwriter: Lennon–McCartney
- Producer: George Martin

Official audio
- "Everybody's Got Something to Hide Except Me and My Monkey" on YouTube

"Everybody's Got Something to Hide Except Me and My Monkey" is a song by the English rock band the Beatles from their 1968 double album The Beatles (also known as the "White Album"). It was written by John Lennon and credited to Lennon–McCartney. The lyrics contain sayings the Beatles heard from Maharishi Mahesh Yogi, with whom they studied Transcendental Meditation in India in early 1968. In his subsequent comments on the song, Lennon said it addressed his bandmates' initial reaction to his relationship with Yoko Ono. Recorded early in the sessions for the White Album, the track typifies Lennon and the Beatles' return to a rock sound in 1968 after their psychedelic period.

== Background ==
"Everybody's Got Something to Hide Except Me and My Monkey" was one of many songs written by John Lennon in or shortly after the Beatles' return from Rishikesh in India, where they studied Transcendental Meditation with Maharishi Mahesh Yogi. The lyrics contain some of the Maharishi's favourite sayings relating to the meditation experience. According to George Harrison, aside from the reference to a monkey, the lyrics were almost entirely taken from the Maharishi's pronouncements; Harrison gave "Everybody's got something to hide" and "Come on, it's such a joy" as examples of their teacher's pet sayings. In the case of the latter, the Maharishi's full teaching was: "Come on. It's such a joy. Take it easy. Take it as it comes. Enjoy!"

Lennon's comments on the song in 1980 confuse chronological events, since it predates his relationship with Yoko Ono and the start of recording for the Beatles' self-titled double album (also known as the "White Album"). He said the lyrics addressed his bandmates' disapproval of his affair with Ono, which began soon after he and his wife Cynthia returned from India. According to Lennon's recollection:

That was just a sort of nice line that I made into a song. It was about me and Yoko. Everybody seemed to be paranoid except for us two, who were in the glow of love. Everything is clear and open when you're in love. Everybody was sort of tense around us: you know, "What is she doing here at the session? Why is she with him?" All this sort of madness is going on around us because we just happened to want to be together all the time.

Paul McCartney believed that the song was about heroin, as the term "monkey" is often associated with the drug. McCartney said: "John started talking about fixes and monkeys. It was a harder terminology, which the rest of us weren't into." (Note: In his book The Beatles Forever, Nicholas Schaffner comments that, while it was highly unlikely to have been an inspiration on Lennon, part of the negative public reaction to Ono's arrival in the Beatles' circle included posters depicting her as "a monster with a monkey face riding upon poor John's stooped back, her talons digging inextricably into his shoulders".) Lennon referred to the song in the final interview he gave before his murder in December 1980, saying: "As I put it in my last incarnation, 'Everybody's Got Something to Hide Except Me and My Monkey'. It means really that one cannot be absolutely oneself in public, because the fact that you're in public makes you ... you have to have some kind of defence, or whatever it is."

== Recording ==
Lennon's working title for the composition was "Come on, Come on". An Esher Demo of the song, recorded at Harrison's Esher home in May 1968, features a backing of acoustic guitars and percussion, and is performed in a more relaxed style compared to the album version.

In author Ian MacDonald's view, the Beatles' recording of "Everybody's Got Something to Hide Except Me and My Monkey" serves as a "further stage in the post-psychedelic re-emergence of Lennon the rock-and-roller, signalled in 'Hey Bulldog'". The band began working on the basic track at EMI Studios on 26 June, although those takes were subsequently discarded and they taped a new basic track the following day. The dates were the Beatles' first full group sessions since early June, as Harrison had travelled to California to film his segments in the Ravi Shankar documentary Raga and Ringo Starr, eager to escape the acrimony within the band, chose to accompany him. During his time away, Harrison resolved to recommit to the guitar as his main instrument, having studied sitar under Shankar's tutelage since 1966; in author Jonathan Gould's description, "Everybody's Got Something to Hide Except Me and My Monkey" thereby provides the first example of Harrison's "vigorous return to form" on the White Album, as he contributes an "angry droning jabber on lead guitar".

Lennon's lead vocals and other overdubs were added to this performance on 1 July and 23 July. Among the overdubs were handclaps, background shouting, an additional snare drum (in the segments following the song title), and a second bass part by McCartney over the build-up before the fadeout. The recording was sped up by mixing the tape running at 43 hertz instead of the usual 50, a process that raised the song's key from D major to E major. (Note: On the Esher demo, Lennon performed it in A major.) Stereo mixing was completed on 12 October.

== Release and reception ==
Apple Records released The Beatles on 22 November 1968. "Everybody's Got Something to Hide" was sequenced as the fourth track on side three of the double LP, between "Mother Nature's Son" and Lennon's rebuke of the Maharishi, "Sexy Sadie".

Among contemporary reviews, Record Mirror commented on the "strange vibrations" provided by Lennon on the album and described the song as worthy of "the oddest title of the year award". The writer added: "Full of take-it-easies and woven with a strong vintage Beatles backing, it moves with lines like 'The higher you fly the deeper you go' and 'Your inside is out and your outside is in' ... but the end takes the cake." Barry Miles of International Times said the song had "a great set of lyrics for those who want to read drug meanings in" and "ends with Bo Diddley, clanging bells and 'come-on, come-on, come-on' like the 'Gobble Chorus' by the Fugs".

[W]hat did the critics say [about "Everybody's Got Something to Hide Except Me and My Monkey"]? "A bit simplistic, no imagery in it." Perhaps I should have said, "Your inside is like a whale juice dripping from the fermented foam of the teeny-boppers’ VD in Times Square as I injected my white clown face with heroin and performed in red-leather knickers." Maybe then they'd like it, right?

— John Lennon, 1980

Reviewing for Rolling Stone, Jann Wenner lauded the album as a representation of "the history and synthesis of Western music", and in "Everybody's Got Something to Hide" he welcomed how "all the old elements of the Beatles are brought back, right up to date, including use of all the old fashions and conventions in such a refreshingly new manner." Wenner highlighted the song's structure and harmonic tones in this regard, adding that listeners should compare it with Steppenwolf's incorporation of the same elements in their work. Melody Maker's Alan Walsh similarly dismissed the idea that the Beatles were merely "going backwards" and credited Lennon with being the main impetus for the album's "staple diet of rock". He described the song as "a plea to take it easy and be cool" with a "tremendous driving beat with heavy electric guitar predominating".

Writing for Rolling Stone shortly after Harrison's death in November 2001, David Fricke featured the track in his article "25 Essential Harrison Performances". Calling it an "explosion of blistering guitars and barking vocals", Fricke concluded: "The song is a Lennon salute to the joys of 1950s rock & roll animalism. But its locomotive heart is Harrison's whirl-around guitar figure, played with ferocious attitude against Lennon's crisp strum and the incessant clang of a hand bell."

In 2018, the music staff of Time Out London ranked the track at number 13 on their list of the best Beatles songs. Coinciding with the 50th anniversary of its release, Jacob Stolworthy of The Independent listed "Everybody's Got Something to Hide Except Me and My Monkey" at number 21 in his ranking of the White Album's 30 tracks. He wrote that "With its jangly guitar riff, repetitive lyrics and frantic bass line, this song – borne from the growing unease with Yoko Ono's presence in the studio – grows more fun with each listen."

== Personnel ==
According to Walter Everett, except where noted:

- John Lennon – double tracked lead vocal, rhythm guitar, handclaps
- Paul McCartney – backing vocal, bass, second bass, hand bell, chocalho, handclaps
- George Harrison – backing vocal, lead guitar, handclaps
- Ringo Starr – drums, handclaps

== Cover versions ==
- Larry Harlow did a cover as "Me and My Monkey" on his album of the same name in 1969.
- Fats Domino covered the song in 1969. In a 1972 interview, Lennon highlighted it as a "great version".
- The Feelies did a cover of the song on their 1980 debut album Crazy Rhythms.
- Hoodoo Gurus covered the song during a Triple J radio show in 1989
- Soundgarden covered the song during a 1989 Peel session.
- Phish, on the album Live Phish Volume 13.
- Chisato Moritaka covered the song on her 1994 album Step by Step.
- Kristin Hersh on the 1999 EP Echo.
- When Mojo released The White Album Recovered in 2008, part of a continuing series of CDs of Beatles albums covered track-by-track by modern artists, the track was covered by My Brightest Diamond.
- Geese covered the song during a 2021 performance for the Seattle radio station KEXP.

== Sources ==
- The Editors of Rolling Stone (2002). Harrison. New York, NY: Rolling Stone Press. ISBN 978-0-7432-3581-5.
- Emerick, Geoff; Massey, Howard (2006). Here, There and Everywhere: My Life Recording the Music of the Beatles. New York: Penguin. ISBN 1-59240-179-1.
- Everett, Walter (1999). The Beatles as Musicians: Revolver Through the Anthology. New York, NY: Oxford University Press. ISBN 978-0-19-512941-0.
- Gould, Jonathan (2007). Can't Buy Me Love: The Beatles, Britain and America. London: Piatkus. ISBN 978-0-7499-2988-6.
- Inglis, Ian (2009). "Revolution". In Womack, Kenneth (ed.). The Cambridge Companion to the Beatles. Cambridge, UK: Cambridge University Press. ISBN 978-0-521-68976-2.
- Lewisohn, Mark (2005) [1988]. The Complete Beatles Recording Sessions: The Official Story of the Abbey Road Years 1962–1970. London: Bounty Books. ISBN 978-0-7537-2545-0.
- MacDonald, Ian (2005). Revolution in the Head: The Beatles' Records and the Sixties (2nd rev. ed.). London: Pimlico. ISBN 1-84413-828-3.
- Miles, Barry (2001). The Beatles Diary Volume 1: The Beatles Years. London: Omnibus Press. ISBN 0-7119-8308-9.
- Schaffner, Nicholas (1978). The Beatles Forever. New York, NY: McGraw-Hill. ISBN 0-07-055087-5.
- Sheff, David (2000) [1981]. All We Are Saying: The Last Major Interview with John Lennon and Yoko Ono. New York: St. Martin's Press. ISBN 0-312-25464-4.
- Shumsky, Susan (2018). Maharishi & Me: Seeking Enlightenment with the Beatles' Guru. New York, NY: Skyhorse Publishing. ISBN 978-1-5107-2268-2.
- Unterberger, Richie (2006). The Unreleased Beatles: Music & Film. San Francisco, CA: Backbeat Books. ISBN 978-0-87930-892-6.
- Winn, John C. (2009). That Magic Feeling: The Beatles' Recorded Legacy, Volume Two, 1966–1970. New York, NY: Three Rivers Press. ISBN 978-0-307-45239-9.
