= Moscow Nights (disambiguation) =

"Moscow Nights" is one of the most famous Russian songs outside Russia.

Moscow Nights may also refer to:

- Moscow Nights (1934 film), a French war drama film
- Moscow Nights (1935 film), a British film
- Moscow Nights (1994 film), a Russian film featuring Aleksandr Feklistov
- "Moscow Nights", a song by The Feelies from their 1980 album Crazy Rhythms
