= Only Life =

Studio album by the Feelies
- Released: September 13, 1988
- Length: 39:17
- Label: Coyote/A&M
- Producer: Steve Rinkoff, Bill Million, Glenn Mercer

The Feelies chronology
The Good Earth (1986)	Only Life (1988)	Time for a Witness (1991)

Singles from Only Life
- 1. "Away" Released: 1988

Only Life is the third album by the American rock band the Feelies, released in 1988. It was made with the same line-up that appeared on the band's previous album, The Good Earth. The album contains a cover of the Velvet Underground's "What Goes On".

The album peaked at No. 173 on the Billboard 200. Jonathan Demme directed the video for "Away".

== Style ==
Only Life has been described as an "updated and mature form" of its predecessor, The Good Earth. It features fewer acoustic tracks, with a "greater focus on speedy jangle-strum rockers".

== Production ==
The album was produced by Glenn Mercer, Bill Million, and Steve Rinkoff.

== Critical reception ==
Professional ratings
Review scores
Source	Rating
AllMusic	4/5 stars
Robert Christgau	B+
The Encyclopedia of Popular Music	3/5 stars
MusicHound Rock: The Essential Album Guide	3.5/5 stars
The Philadelphia Inquirer	4/4 stars
Pitchfork	7.6/10
Rolling Stone	4/5 stars
The Rolling Stone Album Guide	3.5/5 stars
Spin Alternative Record Guide	7/10

Magnet wrote that "the songs grapple with apprehension and the longing for comfort, which the music delivers in the form of indelible hooks and transcendent rave-ups." Rolling Stone wrote: "Driven by the interlocking guitars of Mercer and Bill Million, the band constructs waves of beautiful hypnotic drone, with subtle tempo shifts and percussion accents that ripple through the arrangements." Trouser Press praised the "amazingly exacting sound and performances" and "riveting songs of breathless electricity." USA Today listed the album at number nine on its list of the ten best albums of 1988.

== Track listing ==
All tracks are written by Glenn Mercer except where noted.

Side one
No.	Title	Writer(s)	Length
1.	"It's Only Life"		3:01
2.	"Too Much"	Bill Million, Glenn Mercer	4:38
3.	"Deep Fascination"		4:07
4.	"Higher Ground"		4:38
5.	"The Undertow"		3:43
Total length:			20:07

Side two
No.	Title	Writer(s)	Length
1.	"For Awhile"		4:05
2.	"The Final Word"	Million, Mercer	2:23
3.	"Too Far Gone"	Million, Mercer	3:38
4.	"Away"		5:27
5.	"What Goes On"	Lou Reed	3:37
Total length:			19:10

== Personnel ==
- Glenn Mercer – lead, rhythm and slide guitars, lead vocals, keyboards
- Bill Million – electric and acoustic guitars, backing vocals, e-bow
- Brenda Sauter – bass, backing vocals
- Stan Demeski – drums, percussion
- Dave Weckerman – percussion, drums
