= Some Kinda Love: Performing the Music of The Velvet Underground =

Live album by the Feelies
- Released: October 13, 2023
- Recorded: October 13, 2018
- Venue: White Eagle Hall, Jersey City, New Jersey, US
- Length: 70:50
- Language: English
- Label: Bar/None
- Producer: Bill Million

The Feelies chronology
In Between (2017)	Some Kinda Love: Performing the Music of The Velvet Underground (2023)	Rewind (2025)

“[The Velvet Underground] were ahead of their time. I think that they just had an approach that was very appealing to people who are just starting and playing. It’s simple songs. The structures are very low-key and stripped down. It’s the kind of thing you listen to and you think ‘That’s something within my grasp.’”

—Feelies' guitarist and vocalist Glenn Mercer on the influence of the Velvet Underground on the Feelies

Some Kinda Love: Performing the Music of The Velvet Underground is a 2023 live album by American alternative rock band the Feelies covering the Velvet Underground. The Feelies count the Velvet Underground as a major influence and also toured with Lou Reed in the 1980s. It has received positive reviews from critics.

== Reception ==
Professional ratings
Review scores
Source	Rating
AllMusic	4/5 stars
Pitchfork	7.7/10
Under the Radar	8/10 stars

AllMusic critic Mark Deming wrote that the decision to cover the Velvets is "a calculated risk" with the inevitable comparisons to the original material, especially since both bands share "adoration of the rhythm guitar... eager embrace of simple, hypnotic percussion, and... status as East Coast individualists with an aversion to creative compromise" and this album is successful as "a party where five fans dive deep into some cherished songs and attack them with an ideal balance of reverence and abandon". Bill Pearis of BrooklynVegan attended the live show on this album and calls this release "a delight and a document of their continued love and acknowledgement of their biggest inspiration". Pitchfork critic Stephen Thomas Erlewine praised it for choosing songs that show the positive side of the Velvets' catalog that results in a celebratory recording that is "a roaring rock’n’roll record because the Feelies play with such enthusiasm". Jeff Tamarkin of Relix called this "a vital addition to The Feelies’ own canon" with the band taking "each song’s essence and turn[ing] it into a Feelies tune". Mark Berlyant of Under the Radar called the album "more loose, free, and just flat-out fun" than the band's studio work.

== Track listing ==
All songs written by Lou Reed, except where noted.

1. "Sunday Morning" (John Cale and Reed) – 3:34
2. "Who Loves the Sun" – 2:48
3. "There She Goes Again" – 2:45
4. "What Goes On" – 4:14
5. "Sweet Jane" – 4:22
6. "Head Held High" – 2:51
7. "I'm Waiting for the Man" – 4:12
8. "White Light/White Heat" – 2:41
9. "I Heard Her Call My Name" – 3:27
10. "New Age" – 5:29
11. "That’s the Story of My Life" – 2:09
12. "All Tomorrow’s Parties" – 6:30
13. "Rock & Roll" – 4:23
14. "We’re Gonna Have a Real Good Time Together" – 3:33
15. "Run Run Run" – 4:06
16. "I Can’t Stand It" – 4:02
17. "After Hours" – 2:08
18. "Oh! Sweet Nuthin’" – 7:38

== Personnel ==
The Feelies

- Stan Demeski – drums
- Glenn Mercer – guitar, vocals, mixing
- Bill Million – guitar, background vocals, mixing, cover design
- Brenda Sauter – bass, background vocals, lead vocals on "All Tomorrow's Parries" and "After Hours"
- Dave Weckerman – percussion, keyboards

Additional personnel

- Scott Anthony – recording, mixing, audio mastering at Storybook Sound, Maplewood, New Jersey, United States
- Richard Barone – guitar on "Oh! Sweet Nothin'", vocals "Oh! Sweet Nothin'", photography
- Julie Chencinski – cover design
- James Maestro – guitar on "I Can't Stand It", vocals on "I Can't Stand It"
- Andy Peters – assistant recording
- Howard Wuefling – liner notes

== See also ==
- 2023 in American music
- 2023 in rock music
- List of 2023 albums
