= Because of Me =

Single by Billy Gilman
- Released: December 13, 2016
- Recorded: December 2016 in Los Angeles, California
- Genre: Pop
- Length: 3:04
- Label: Republic
- Songwriters: Jacob Kasher; Nick Ruth; Phil Shaouy; Ari Leff

Billy Gilman singles chronology
"Say You Will" (2014)	"Because of Me" (2016)	"Get It Got It Good" (2017)

Music video
- "Because of Me" on YouTube

"Because of Me" is a song recorded by American singer Billy Gilman as his would-be coronation single for the eleventh season of The Voice, on which he finished as the runner-up. The song was written by Jacob Kasher, Nick Ruth, Phil Shaouy, and Ari Leff and was originally intended to be recorded by Maroon 5, however, Adam Levine, who served as Gilman's coach on The Voice, felt it would be a better fit for Gilman. It was released as a single on December 13, 2016, through Republic Records.

== Background ==
In 2016, Gilman competed on season 11 of the reality singing competition The Voice. He attracted the attention of all four coaches, but chose to join Adam Levine's team. On the final night of performances, each of the final four contestants were required to perform one cover song, one duet with their coach, and one original song, which would also serve as his or her coronation single.

"Because of Me" was written by Jacob Kasher, Nick Ruth, Phil Shaouy, and Ari Leff and was planned to be recorded by Maroon 5 for their forthcoming sixth studio album.

"Because of Me" serves as Gilman's first major label single release since "Elisabeth" (from Dare to Dream) in 2001.

== Reception ==
=== Critical ===
Jessica Molinari of Bustle praised Gilman for his passionate delivery, which she wrote, "was palpable in every line he sang." She also wrote that the song was very "authentic," and that it "was completely him." Perri Blumberg of Rolling Stone wrote that the song "showed his versatility as both performer and songwriter." Carter Matt, writing for his eponymous entertainment blog, mirrored Molinari's sentiments regarding the song's "fit" with Gilman's persona and also noted "Because of Me" is "easily the catchiest of the four winners' singles," and "could... be an adult-contemporary hit" Reviewing Gilman's performance of the song on The Voice, which he graded a 'B', Michael Slezak of TVLine wrote that the song "painted Billy as a vocalist who might have some radio relevance with the right material," but also described the track as unmemorable.

=== Commercial ===
"Because of Me" did not enter the Billboard Hot 100, but did debut at number 6 on the Bubbling Under Hot 100 Singles chart dated December 31, 2016. The song also charted at number 15 on the Billboard Digital Songs chart the same week. "Because of Me" notably charted one position lower than Gilman's cover of Frank Sinatra's "My Way", which was also performed for the finale of The Voice, on both tallies. In Canada, the song reached number 37 on the Hot Canadian Digital Songs chart dated December 31, 2016.

== Music video ==
An accompanying music video was uploaded to the official YouTube channel for The Voice on December 12, 2016, in conjunction with the finale performance episode. The video depicts Gilman in various domestic scenarios, including preparing coffee in his kitchen and going out to walk his dog. At the end, his significant other arrives, probably to celebrate Christmas together. Critics have noted that the wide-ranging appeal of the video ties into his musical shift towards an adult contemporary style.

== Charts ==
Chart (2016)	Peak position
Canada Digital Songs (Billboard)	37
US Bubbling Under Hot 100 (Billboard)	6
US Digital Song Sales (Billboard)	15

== Release history ==
Country	Date	Format	Label	Ref.
Canada	December 13, 2016	Digital download	Republic	
United States	December 13, 2016	Digital download	Republic	
