= Here Before (album) =

Studio album by the Feelies
- Released: April 12, 2011
- Genre: Post-punk, jangle pop, college rock
- Length: 45:55
- Label: Bar/None
- Producer: Glenn Mercer, Bill Million

The Feelies chronology
Time for a Witness (1991)	Here Before (2011)	Uncovered (2016)

Here Before is the fifth studio album by the American rock band the Feelies. It was released on April 12, 2011, on Bar/None.

== Reception ==
Professional ratings
Aggregate scores
Source	Rating
Metacritic	73/100
Review scores
Source	Rating
AllMusic	4/5 stars
American Noise	3.5/5 stars
The A.V. Club	B
Dusted Magazine	(Favorable)
Pitchfork Media	7.5/10
Q	3/5 stars
Rolling Stone	3.5/5 stars
Spin	7/10

This album received positive reviews from Michael Hann, Stuart Berman, and Mark Deming also earning a score of 73 out of a possible 100 based on 17 critical reviews by Metacritic, indicating generally positive feedback.

== Track listing ==
Here Before track listing
No.	Title	Length
1.	"Nobody Knows"	2:52
2.	"Should Be Gone"	3:30
3.	"Again Today"	3:43
4.	"When You Know"	3:16
5.	"Later On"	3:11
6.	"Way Down"	3:39
7.	"Morning Comes"	4:12
8.	"Change Your Mind"	4:38
9.	"Here Before"	3:19
10.	"Time is Right"	2:35
11.	"Bluer Skies"	3:13
12.	"On and On"	3:52
13.	"So Far"	3:55
Total length:		45:55

== Personnel ==
- Glenn Mercer – guitar, vocals
- Bill Million – guitar, vocals
- Dave Weckerman – percussion
- Brenda Sauter – bass, vocals
- Stan Demeski – drums
