= Javelin Boot =

American pop band (1978–1998)

Javelin Boot was a pop band formed in Texas in 1978 by guitarist Dan O'Neill, bassist Blake Patterson, and drummer David Mider. Described as "one of Austin's premier pop bands" by the Austin American-Statesman. They released the albums The Schwa Sound (1988) and The Mauve Album (1989), before moving on to Pravda Records, where they released For Those About to Pop (1993) and Fundamentally Sound (1996). Additionally, their music has been used in television episodes of Melrose Place and Party of Five.

They broke up in 1998, after O'Neill moved to Taiwan.
