= The Good Earth (The Feelies album) =

Studio album by the Feelies
- Released: 1986
- Studio: Mixolydian, Boonton, New Jersey
- Genre: Jangle rock
- Length: 36:21
- Label: Coyote/Twin/Tone (original US release); Rough Trade (original UK release)
- Producer: Glenn Mercer, Bill Million, Peter Buck

The Feelies chronology
Crazy Rhythms (1980)	The Good Earth (1986)	Only Life (1988)

Professional ratings
Review scores
Source	Rating
AllMusic	3.5/5 stars
The A.V. Club	A
Classic Rock	6/10 stars
Pitchfork	9.1/10
PopMatters	7/10
Rolling Stone	4/5 stars
The Rolling Stone Album Guide	4/5 stars
Spin Alternative Record Guide	8/10
The Village Voice	A−

The Good Earth is the second album by the American band the Feelies. It was released in 1986 on Coyote Records, six years following their debut album Crazy Rhythms. The original LP was contained in a sleeve designed by Glenn Mercer, featuring a front cover photo of the band by bassist Brenda Sauter and a back cover photo by John Baumgartner with coloring by Sauter.

== Track listing ==
All tracks are written by Glenn Mercer and Bill Million.

Side A
No.	Title	Length
1.	"On the Roof"	2:51
2.	"The High Road"	4:20
3.	"The Last Roundup"	2:50
4.	"Slipping (Into Something)"	5:54
5.	"When Company Comes"	2:15

Side B
No.	Title	Length
6.	"Let's Go"	2:37
7.	"Two Rooms"	2:32
8.	"The Good Earth"	3:48
9.	"Tomorrow Today"	5:30
10.	"Slow Down"	3:13
Total length:		36:21

2009 digital edition bonus tracks
No.	Title	Writer(s)	Length
11.	"Sedan Delivery" (Neil Young cover)	Neil Young	2:53
12.	"She Said, She Said" (The Beatles cover)	John Lennon, Paul McCartney	3:02
13.	"Slipping (Into Something)" (live at 9:30 Club, 2009)		6:09
Total length:			48:25

== Personnel ==
- Glenn Mercer – lead and rhythm guitars, vocals, keyboards
- Bill Million – rhythm and lead guitars, backing vocals
- Dave Weckerman – percussion
- Brenda Sauter – bass guitar, backing vocals, violin
- Stan Demeski – drums, percussion
