= Mattie Stepanek =

American writer (1990–2004)

Mattie J.T. Stepanek
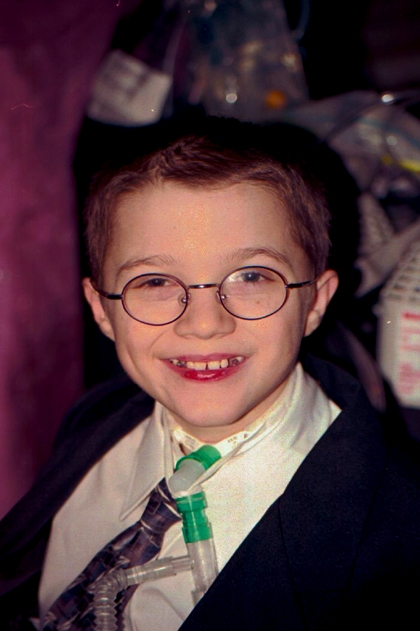
- Stepanek in June 2004
- Born: Matthew Joseph Thaddeus Stepanek; July 17, 1990; Washington, D.C.
- Died: June 22, 2004 (aged 13); Washington, D.C.
- Mother: Jeni Stepanek (Mama Peace)
- Website: mattiespeacefoundation.org

Matthew Joseph Thaddeus Stepanek (July 17, 1990 – June 22, 2004), known as Mattie J.T. Stepanek, was an American author and motivational speaker. He published seven books of poetry and essays on peace, several of which appeared on The New York Times Best Seller list before his death at the age of 13. He wanted to be remembered as "a poet, a peacemaker, and a philosopher who played."

== Life and career ==
Matthew Stepanek was born on July 17, 1990. Stepanek's parents divorced when he was a child. He was raised in Upper Marlboro, Maryland, and later lived in Rockville, Maryland. His hero was former U.S. President Jimmy Carter, who described Stepanek as "the most extraordinary person whom I have ever known".

Stepanek had the rare disorder dysautonomic mitochondrial myopathy. His three older siblings died from the same illness. The condition was unknown until his mother was diagnosed with mitochondrial disease in 1992, after all four of the children had been born.

He was the lyricist for Music Through Heartsongs performed by Billy Gilman. The album was released by Epic Records in April 2003. It debuted at number 109 on the Billboard 200 and at number 15 on the Hot Country Songs chart.

=== Death ===
Stepanek died at age 13 at Children's National Medical Center in Washington, D.C., on June 22, 2004. He was interred at the Gate of Heaven Cemetery in Silver Spring, Maryland.

== Legacy ==
Shortly after Stepanek's death in 2004, the non-profit Mattie Stepanek Peace Foundation was established by a group of citizens in Rockville, Maryland, where Stepanek had lived.

In 2008, the We Are Family Foundation hosted the first annual international Three Dot Dash Just Peace Summit based on the message Stepanek offered in his book Just Peace.

On October 21, 2008, the Mattie J.T. Stepanek Park was dedicated in Rockville, Maryland, at an event attended by Oprah Winfrey, Nile Rodgers, Billy Gilman and others. Pepper Choplin set words from Stepanek's final peace speech to music, and a 100-voice choir performed the debut of the song "Look Up Way Down". Central to the park is its Peace Garden, which has a design based on imagery Stepanek used in his book of essays Just Peace: A Message of Hope. In the Peace Garden there is a life-size bronze statue of Stepanek and his service dog, Micah, surrounded by chess tables. Throughout the park are presentations of quotes from Stepanek.

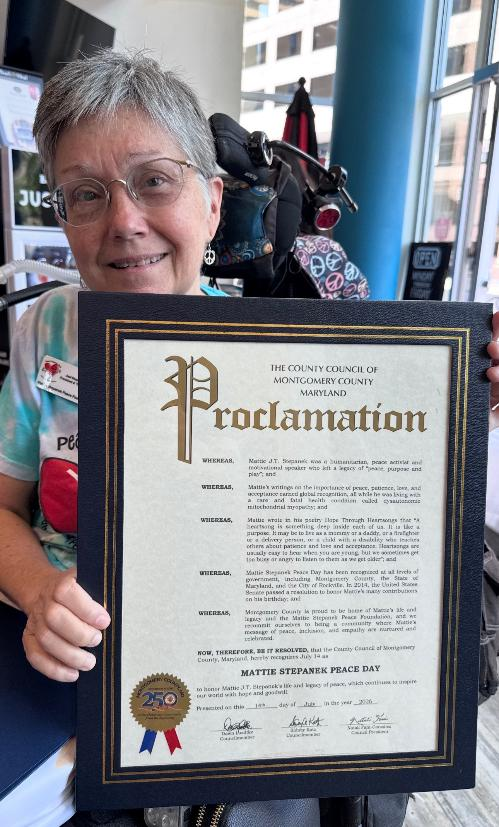
Stepanek's mother, Jeni Stepanek Smith, in 2026 holding a framed proclamation of Mattie Stepanek Peace Day as recognized at the local, state, and national levels

On June 6, 2010, a performance of Heartsongs took place at Carnegie Hall. It featured Stepanek's poetry, set to music by composer Joseph Martin. The music was performed by 200 members of Distinguished Concerts Singers International—including its Children's Choir—under the direction of conductor Stephen Roddy.

In 2011, Oprah Winfrey named Stepanek as one of her all-time most memorable guests in the 25-year history of her show. Mattie convinced Oprah not to retire from her show on its 20th anniversary, saying by email that the show was "good for the world and good for [Oprah]". During the final studio audience taping, Stepanek's mother and Oprah shared memories of Stepanek; they discussed his life story as told in the book Messenger book; and Oprah called him "a messenger for our times".

In 2013, the National Catholic Partnership on Disability posthumously honored Stepanek with its Youth//Young Adult Leadership Award.

At the behest of the Mattie Stepanek Peace Foundation, in 2013, Barbara Mikulski, a United States senator from Maryland, sent a letter to US President Barack Obama, wanting to declare July 17 (Stepanek's birthday) a national peace day in Stepanek's honor. In July 2014, Ben Cardin, a junior United States senator from Maryland, joined Mikulski in introducing Senate Resolution 509, which was approved by the Senate and which honors Stepanek's life and legacy. In 2017, the city of Rockville, Maryland, voted to declare Mattie's July 17 birthday as "Peace Day" at a local level in perpetua, as a statement of support for the National Peace Day Campaign.

=== Veneration ===
On September 21, 2012, the feast day of Matthew the Apostle, the Mattie J.T. Stepanek Guild was officially initiated. The purpose of the guild is to gather information and investigate Stepanek's life for a possible cause of canonization in the Catholic Church.

On June 22, 2014, a memorial Mass at the Franciscan Monastery in Washington, D.C., commemorated the tenth anniversary of Stepanek's death. It was concelebrated by several priests from the Archdiocese of Washington.

== Awards ==
- 1999 Melinda Lawrence International Book Award for inspirational written works from the Children's Hospice International, 1999
- 2004 Nu Skin Enterprises's Nu Skin Force for Good Foundation Lifetime Achievement Award
- 2007 Independent Publisher's 'Peacemaker of the Year' Award
