= Pravda Records =

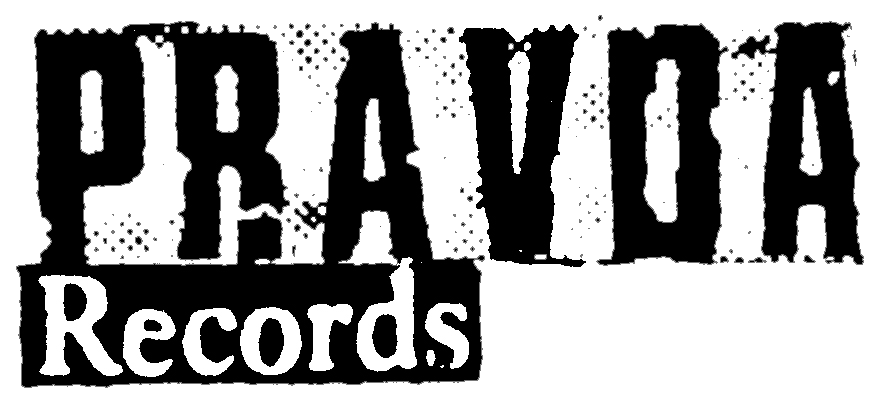
- Founded: 1984; 42 years ago
- Founder: Kenn Goodman
- Genre: Indie rock, Soul, Pop, Experimental
- Country of origin: United States
- Location: Chicago, Illinois
- Official website: www.pravdamusic.com

Pravda Records is an American independent record label based in Chicago, Illinois, United States, representing a diverse roster of indie rock, soul, pop, and experimental artists. It is one of the longest-running independent record labels in Chicago.

== History ==
Pravda Records was founded by Kenn Goodman and his college roommate Rick Mosher in 1984 while they were both students at Northern Illinois University. "Pravda", the Russian word for "truth", was chosen as the label's name by Goodman after he read it in a Kurt Vonnegut novel. Goodman designed the label's logo out of crackly press type, which is still used to this day. Pravda's first release was a five song cassette titled "Foma" by Goodman and Mosher's own guitar-pop band The Service. In 1986, Pravda opened a retail store at 3730 N. Clark Street in the storefront of Wrigleyville music venue Metro Chicago. The store focused on carrying inventory made up entirely of independently made goods and music such as t-shirts, recordings, and additional band merch. Artists playing Metro would often make pre-show appearances at the Pravda Store and hang out there post-show until closing time. In 1992, Goodman bought out Mosher's share of the label, and in 1993 decided to close the retail store to shift emphasis back unto the label and its artists. To date, Pravda Records has over 100 releases in a variety of genres from artists such as Grammy Award-nominated Susan Voelz, Glenn Mercer of The Feelies, and late Motown legend Andre Williams.

In 2010, Pravda celebrated their 25th anniversary with a special performance at the since-closed Irving Park venue Abbey Pub on January 22, 2010. The Service headlined, supported by The Slugs and Boom Hank.

In June 2022, Pravda held Pravdafest, the label's first-ever music festival at Skokie microbrewery Sketchbook Brewery Co. Sketchbook created a limited-edition brew, "Pravda 38", specifically for the fest, describing it as an "indie-rock lager." In August 2024, to celebrate the label's 40th year, Pravda hosted its second Pravdafest, this time at Berwyn venue, Fitzgerald's.

Pravda was voted Best Local Label by the Chicago Reader in both 2023 and 2024.

=== Bughouse records ===
Drawn to outsider musicians, Goodman created Bughouse Records in 1992, a subsidiary of Pravda to release a Live in Chicago series of recordings from outsider musicians performed at local nightclubs. The first Live in Chicago was from rockabilly singer-songwriter Hasil Adkins also known as The Haze. Adkins performed two shows at Lounge Ax in November 1992, which were recorded in their entirety with no overdubs and include the moment Adkins threw his guitar into the crowd, hitting a fan and sending him to the hospital for stitches.

The next Live in Chicago recording was by Tiny Tim after Goodman met him at a gas station in Ames, Iowa while on tour with the New Duncan Imperials. At the time, Tim was playing comedy clubs with Leave It to Beaver’s Jerry Mathers. The two stayed in touch and Bughouse brought Tim to Chicago in 1993 to perform at Quicksilver (now known as Martyrs’). After Tim's Live in Chicago the New Duncan Imperials began backing him on tour, which removed Tim from the comedy circuit and put him back in the music scene where Goodman felt he belonged. "Tiny Tim was so interesting to me," Goodman recalled in a 2022 interview with Chicago Reader's Mark Guarino. "We’d have long discussions about the history of show business… he was a serious musician and serious music expert. He knew so many songs from the 1910s and 1920s and was educated in the history of vaudeville. He was much more than ‘Tiptoe Through the Tulips.’"

The last Live in Chicago recording was by American guitarist Cordell Jackson in 1995 at Schubas Tavern. Cordell's Live in Chicago was her only full length record and live recording.

== Philosophy ==
While higher-profile Chicago labels became known for a certain sound, such as Bloodshot for alt-country and Touch and Go for alternative rock/noise, Pravda has remained largely genre agnostic throughout the decades, which Goodman believes has allowed the label to outlast trends. In a 2010 article in the Chicago Tribune for Pravda's 25th Anniversary, Goodman is quoted as stating that Pravda does not "promote the label as a sound" but rather promotes "bands as individuals."

Since the mid-1990s, Pravda has focused a great deal on music licensing, recognizing that along with remaining genre inclusive, licensing is integral to keeping a small record label financially viable. Music supervisors for 90s hits such as Dawson's Creek, Melrose Place, and Party of Five contacted Pravda looking for high-quality catalogs of indie music that they could license for cheaper than from that of major labels. Pravda artists such as the Iowa City-based Diplomats of Solid Sound have been featured in a wide array of TV and film productions such as Entourage and 50/50, while Goodman's own The Service had their early-90s song "Mine" featured in a long-running marketing campaign for KFC. Other placements include Netflix's Grace and Frankie, Beverly Hills, 90210, and 2024's Between the Temples starring Jason Schwartzman and Carol Kane.

== Artist Roster ==
- Andre Williams
- Black Smokers
- Boom Hank
- Brian Krumm and His Barfly Friends
- Cheer-Accident
- Chris Greene Quartet
- The Civil Tones
- Claude Pate
- The Diplomats of Solid Sound
- The Farmers
- Glenn Mercer
- The Goldstars
- Green
- The Handcuffs
- The Hollowmen
- The Imperial Sound
- The Impotent Sea Snakes
- Javelin Boot
- Lab Partners
- Lost Cause
- Matt Wilson & His Orchestra
- The Melismatics
- MIIRRORS
- Nathan Graham
- New Duncan Imperials
- Nora O'Connor
- Precious Wax Drippings
- The Ruiners
- Ryan and Pony
- The Service
- The Slugs
- Sonic45
- Steve Dawson
- Sunshine Boys
- Susan Voelz
- The Trypes
- Wake Ooloo
- Young Fresh Fellows (The band is shown performing on the sidewalk in front of the Pravda Records storefront on the cover of their "Refreshments" EP. They also later released the "Two Guitars, Bass and Drums" 7-inch on Pravda)
