= Music Through Heartsongs: Songs Based on the Poems of Mattie J.T. Stepanek =

Studio album by Billy Gilman
- Released: April 15, 2003
- Genre: Country
- Label: Epic
- Producer: Angela Bacari, Charles Calello, Sandy Linzer, David Malloy, Bruce Roberts

Billy Gilman chronology
Dare to Dream (2001)	Music Through Heartsongs: Songs Based on the Poems of Mattie J.T. Stepanek (2003)	Everything and More (2005)

Professional ratings
Review scores
Source	Rating
Allmusic	2.5/5 stars

Music Through Heartsongs: Songs Based on the Poems of Mattie J.T. Stepanek (sometimes abbreviated to Music Through Heartsongs) is the third studio album by the American country music singer Billy Gilman, released on April 15, 2003, on Epic Records Nashville. It is his final album for that label. The songs on this album are based on poems written by the child poet Mattie Stepanek, who died of muscular dystrophy one year after the album's release.

== Track listing ==
No.	Title	Writer(s)	Length
1.	"For Our World"	Mattie Stepanek, David Malloy, Jimmy Nichols	3:24
2.	"About Things That Matter"	Stepanek, Angela Lauer	3:12
3.	"Morning Gift"	Stepanek, James T. Slater	2:13
4.	"I Am/Shades of Life"	Stepanek, Malloy, Bruce Roberts	4:40
5.	"It Happened Anyway"	Stepanek, Tom Douglas	3:30
6.	"Possession"	Stepanek, Randle Chowning, Mark Morton	2:49
7.	"Songs of the Wind"	Stepanek, Richard Leigh	2:24
8.	"Making Real Sense of the Senses"	Stepanek, Roberts	3:39
9.	"The Gift of Color"	Stepanek, Slater	3:19
10.	"I Could… If They Would"	Stepanek, Jon Stone	2:50
11.	"About Memories"	Stepanek, Angela Bacari, Billy Gilman, Sandy Linzer	4:34
12.	"About Watches"	Stepanek, Bacari, Gilman, Linzer	3:13

== Personnel ==
- Angela Bacari – background vocals
- Bekka Bramlett – background vocals
- Joe Chemay – bass guitar
- Mickey Jack Cones – electric guitar, background vocals
- Eric Darken – percussion
- Billy Gilman – lead vocals, string arrangements
- Tommy Harden – drums
- John Jorgenson – electric guitar
- Troy Lancaster – electric guitar
- Sam Levine – alto flute, recorder
- Alé Lorenzo – ukulele
- Jerry McPherson – electric guitar
- David Malloy – background vocals
- Liana Manis – background vocals
- Wendy Moten – background vocals
- Jimmy Nichols – keyboards, piano, string arrangements, background vocals
- Britt Savage – background vocals
- Michael Spriggs – acoustic guitar

== Chart performance ==
Chart (2003)	Peak position
US Billboard 200	109
US Top Country Albums (Billboard)	15
