= We Are Family Foundation =

Nonprofit education and peace organization

- Abbreviation: WAFF
- Formation: July 22, 2002; 24 years ago
- Founders: Nancy Hunt (president); Nile Rodgers (chairman)
- Legal status: 501(c)(3) organization
- Headquarters: New York City
- Region served: Worldwide
- Website: www.wearefamilyfoundation.org

We Are Family Foundation (WAFF) is a 501(c)(3) nonprofit organization founded by musician Nile Rodgers and his life partner, Nancy Hunt. Based in New York City—and established in the wake of the 9/11 attacks—WAFF recognizes, funds, and mentors youth leaders who work to bring about positive change. As of 2023, its programs included Three Dot Dash, which funds and mentors young people leading projects that address issues related to basic human needs, such as food, water, and shelter; the Youth To The Front Fund, which supports activists under the age of 30 and youth-led organizations fighting systemic racism and inequality; and Youth To The Table, which brings youth delegations to gatherings including the United Nations General Assembly, the Conference of the Parties and the World Economic Forum.

We Are Family Foundation has funded 16 elementary schools in Mali, Malawi, Nepal and Nicaragua in partnership with the international non-profit, buildOn. Young people from seventy countries have participated in the foundation's programs.

In January 2024 the World Economic Forum announced that Rodgers would receive its 2024 Crystal Award. Presented during the opening session of the event, the announcement stated that Rodgers would be recognized for his "efforts to make the world a more peaceful, equal and inclusive place through his music, his commitment to fighting systemic racism, inequality and injustice, and by championing innovative youth voices." WAFF and UNESCO signed a memorandum of understanding to formalize a partnership to foster youth empowerment and combat discrimination globally in September 2024.

== History ==
=== "We Are Family" (2001), We Are Family: A Musical Message for All, founding ===
With a goal of helping to begin the healing process following the 9/11 attacks, in late September Rodgers and Tommy Boy Records president Tom Silverman gathered more than 200 musicians, athletes and celebrities to record the Sister Sledge hit, "We Are Family". Written by Rodgers and Bernard Edwards in 1978, the 2001 recording featured Patti LaBelle, Queen Latifah, Diana Ross, Sister Sledge and Luther Vandross, among others. Rodgers produced the single and served as the musical director for the "We Are Family" sessions, which took place in New York and Los Angeles on September 22 and 23. Spike Lee directed the accompanying music video, and Danny Schechter filmed, wrote and directed a 79-minute documentary, The Making and Meaning of 'We Are Family' . In 2002 it premiered as a special selection at the Sundance Film Festival, where it generated considerable audience enthusiasm.

The record charted, but received little exposure, and MTV rejected the video. (Schechter said it was "too black for them.") An activist since he was a teenager, when he worked with underserved children as a Black Panther, Rodgers began to work on an idea for a children's version of "We Are Family" several weeks after the rerecording was released. He was well-versed in children's music: his first gig as a professional musician was on Sesame Street.

In December 2001, Rodgers recruited his friend, Sesame Street producer and songwriter Christopher Cerf, to help develop the project. With Hunt, Rodgers and Cerf created We Are Family: A Musical Message for All, a music video that featured more than 100 characters from children's television, including Arthur from the animated television show of the same name, Barney, characters from Sesame Street, such as Elmo and Big Bird, Clifford the Big Red Dog, Dora the Explorer, The Muppets, SpongeBob SquarePants from the animated television show of the same name, and Winnie-the-Pooh (The Book of Pooh version). The three-minute video required cooperation from multiple stakeholders and took more than four months to complete. It premiered as a PSA on the Disney Channel, Nickelodeon, and PBS simultaneously on March 11, 2002, six months after the 9/11 attacks.

In July 2002, Hunt and Rodgers founded We Are Family Foundation. The name was chosen to echo the song's message of uniting people "across the boundaries of class, creed, gender, nationality, race and sexuality." In addition to tolerance and cultural diversity, We Are Family Foundation's early focus included education; a school-building campaign was initiated shortly after the organization was founded.

The foundation's first fundraiser took place at the home of attorney Mark Barondess in Annapolis later that month. Mattie J.T. Stepanek – the terminally ill 11-year-old author of three New York Times bestsellers – was honored with WAFF's first Peacemaker Award. In 2005, following Stepanek's death, the Peacemaker Award was renamed the Mattie J.T. Stepanek Peacemaker Award.

=== We Are Family: A Musical Message for All DVD/curriculum, controversy ===
In 2005, WAFF partnered with the Anti-Defamation League and its educational arm, A Word of Difference Institute, to create a tolerance and diversity curriculum built around We Are Family: A Musical Message for All. Financed through a grant from the Toni Mendez Shapiro estate, 60,000 DVDs of the music video and its curriculum were manufactured. FedEx donated their services and the DVD, intended to teach tolerance, was delivered to every private and public elementary school in the United States for free.

Before the DVD was delivered to schools, James Dobson, the founder of the Christian fundamentalist group Focus on the Family, accused the We Are Family Foundation of promoting a "gay agenda" due to the presence of SpongeBob SquarePants in the video, causing a "media firestorm" to erupt in January 2005. It was widely reported that Dobson said SpongeBob was gay. In an interview on MSNBC, he said: "I did not do that. That's the stupidest thing I have ever heard of."

Censored in Mississippi and banned in Broward County, Florida, the We Are Family: A Musical Message for All DVD was sent to schools on March 11, 2005, as initially planned. The children's version of "We Are Family" aired that same day on PBS, Nickelodeon and the Disney Channel.

=== Programs and We Are Family Foundation awards ===
==== We Are Family Foundation awards ====
Since 2002, WAFF has held an annual gala to present four awards: the Mattie J.T. Stepanek Peacemaker Award, which recognizes people who have made significant contributions toward promoting a peaceful society; the Visionary Award, which honors a corporation or a person in the corporate world for philanthropic efforts; the Humanitarian Award, for people in the public eye who have worked to better the human condition, and the Unity Award, for people in the public eye who have worked to better the human condition through art. Honorees have included Maya Angelou, Bono, Jimmy Carter, Deepak Chopra, Roger Daltrey, LL Cool J, Jean Paul Gaultier, Sir Elton John, Quincy Jones, Nelson Mandela, Dikembe Mutombo, Dolly Parton, Paul Simon, Sting and Trudie Styler, Desmond and Leah Tutu and Steven Van Zandt.

==== Three Dot Dash ====
In 2008, WAFF introduced Three Dot Dash, a yearlong leadership and mentoring program designed to recognize and support the efforts of global teen leaders—young people who are leading projects that address issues related to basic human needs: food, water, health, shelter, safety, education and the environment.

Inspired by Stepanek's book, Just Peace: A Message of Hope, the We Are Family Foundation hosted the first international Three Dot Dash Just Peace Summit in 2008. The summit teaches teen leaders how to use media, technology and distribution to generate media attention and public support for their causes.

As of 2023, the Three Dot Dash program had selected and mentored global teen leaders from more than 70 countries across 6 continents.

==== TEDxTeen ====
In 2010, WAFF launched TEDxTeen, producing a series of ten conferences in New York and London between 2010 and 2017. Most of the 132 speakers and performers featured were teenagers. They included Jacob Barnett, an autistic teenager who became the world's youngest published astrophysics researcher ("Forgetting What You Know"); Marian Bechtel, who helped people in war-torn countries detect and avoid landmines ("Banjos, Landmines, and Saying Yes"); Jake Davis, an ethical hacker ("How We Hack the Planet"); Wu Tang Clan's GZA ("The Genius of Science"); three-time cancer survivor, Kajmere Houchins ("Opportunity, Just What the Doctor Ordered"); musician and producer Steve Lacy ("Bare Maximum"); Ann Makosinski, who invented a torch powered by the heat from her hand to help kids that had no electricity at home study ("Why I Don't Have a Smart Phone"); Iraqi musician and activist Zuhal Sultan ("Why We Should Speak in Music"); and Marah Zahalka, the youngest member of the Middle East's first all-woman race car driving team ("Follow Your Drive"). Alessia Cara performed live for the first time at TEDxTeen in 2015, "planting a flag for the outsiders, the shy kids, the loners."

Among others, TEDxTeen conferences were hosted by Chelsea Clinton, Monique Coleman, Touré, and Q-Tip. Rodgers hosted both the inaugural event in 2010, and the "Crazy Ones''-themed conference in 2014.

==== Youth To The Front Fund ====
Rodgers at the 2024 World Economic Forum

In 2020, We Are Family Foundation launched the Youth To The Front Fund to support and fund youth activists under 30, and youth-led organizations that fight systemic racism, inequality, inequity and injustice. The Youth To The Front Fund's 2020 "Frontliners" represented seven states in the US and 10 countries on four different continents.

Youth to the Front Fund was created following George Floyd's murder. In an interview with Rolling Stone, Rodgers said: "There have been countless murders of people of color for hundreds of years. But the killing of George Floyd has resonated in a way I have never witnessed in my lifetime. I was politicized as a young person and now young people are leading the equal rights cause all around the world. I'm proud and I'm hopeful. Maybe at this moment in time, we'll truly move in a direction of positive change for equality, equity and equal justice."

The We Are Family Foundation announced the 2024 Youth To The Front Fund Frontliners, "The Creatives," in a 30-second PSA directed by Michael Holman. The PSA introduced 25 "Creatives" and incorporates footage from Holman's 1970s and 1980s Super 8 film archives. It debuted as an 'art ad' during Saturday Night Live on February 3, 2024.

==== Youth To The Table ====
To bring young people's voices to decision-making spaces, the Youth To The Table program brings youth delegations to influential gatherings including the United Nations General Assembly (UNGA), the Conference of the Parties (COP) and the World Economic Forum (WEF). Partnered with policymakers, governments, business leaders, organizations and corporations, Youth To The Table was founded in 2023. In December 2023 a Youth To The Table delegation attended COP28. They collaborated with earthday.org at the conference.

== Funding ==
We Are Family Foundation is primarily funded through public donations. In December 2021, Rodgers sold more than 100 guitars at auction to benefit the organization, raising $1,640,500. He donated $1m to We Are Family Foundation to mark his 70th birthday in 2022.
