= One Voice (Billy Gilman song) =

2000 single by Billy Gilman

Single by Billy Gilman

from the album One Voice
- B-side: "'Til I Can Make It on My Own"
- Released: May 27, 2000
- Recorded: 1999–2000
- Genre: Country
- Length: 4:09
- Label: Epic Nashville
- Songwriters: Don Cook; David Malloy
- Producers: Don Cook; David Malloy; Blake Chancey

Billy Gilman singles chronology
"One Voice" (2000)	"Oklahoma" (2000)

Music video
- "One Voice" on YouTube

"One Voice" is a song written by David Malloy and Don Cook, and recorded by American country music singer Billy Gilman. It was released in May 2000 as the lead-off single and title track from Gilman's debut studio album One Voice. The song became Gilman's first and only top 20 single on the Billboard Hot Country Singles & Tracks (now Hot Country Songs) chart as well as his only top 40 single on the all-genre Billboard Hot 100.

Gilman was only 12 years old at the time of the song's release, making him the youngest male artist in history to have a solo top 40 hit on the country charts. "One Voice" was nominated at the 43rd Grammy Awards for Best Male Country Vocal Performance and Best Country Song for the songwriters, Don Cook and David Malloy.

== Content ==
The song is about violence from the viewpoint of a child.

== Music video ==
Directed by Trey Fanjoy, the video shows Billy Gilman on the bus home from school and watches everything that goes on around him. At one point in the video, a boy holding a gun (shown earlier in the video) throws it in the river below the bridge, is a similar take on the line of the song.

== Track listing ==
US CD single

1. "One Voice"
2. "'Til I Can Make It on My Own"

UK CD single

1. "One Voice"
2. "Warm & Fuzzy"
3. "'Til I Can Make It on My Own"
4. "One Voice" (music video)

== Chart performance ==
"One Voice" debuted at number 71 on Billboard's Hot Country Singles & Tracks chart for the chart week of May 27, 2000. When the song became a top 40 hit, Gilman became the youngest artist to chart a top 40 country hit, edging out Brenda Lee to become the youngest person to ever have a song on the country singles chart. The song also became a top 40 hit on the Billboard Hot 100 chart, reaching number 38.

=== Weekly charts ===
Chart (2000)	Peak position
Australia (ARIA)	77
Canada Country Singles (RPM)	23
UK Singles (Official Charts)	80
US Billboard Hot 100	38
US Adult Contemporary (Billboard)	29
US Hot Country Songs (Billboard)	20

=== Year-end charts ===
Chart (2000)	Position
US Country Songs (Billboard)	70
