= Crazy Rhythms =

Studio album by the Feelies
- Released: February 29, 1980
- Recorded: 1979
- Studio: Vanguard (New York City)
- Genres: Art punk; post-punk; avant-pop; new wave
- Length: 43:04
- Language: English
- Label: Stiff
- Producers: Bill Million; Glenn Mercer; Mark Abel

The Feelies chronology
Crazy Rhythms (1980)	The Good Earth (1986)

Crazy Rhythms is the debut studio album by American rock band the Feelies. It was released in the United Kingdom on February 29, 1980, and in the United States in April 1980, through British record label Stiff. Although it was not commercially successful initially, it has remained critically lauded in the decades since its release. Its fusion of post-punk and jangle pop was influential on the forthcoming alternative rock genre, with R.E.M., among others, citing the album as an influence.

In September 2009 the album was performed live in its entirety as part of the All Tomorrow's Parties-curated Don't Look Back series.

== Background ==
On the album, band member Glenn Mercer has said "The sound we were after was a reaction against the punk scene [...] Being a little older, we felt it had all been done before. We wanted the guitars to be cleaner, and we started experimenting with a lot of percussion."

== Release history ==
The first release on CD was in Germany and the United States in 1986. A&M Records released the album on CD in 1990 with a bonus track, a cover of the Rolling Stones' "Paint It Black". The track was recorded in 1990 without Fier or DeNunzio.

Bar/None Records reissued Crazy Rhythms on September 8, 2009, while Domino Records reissued the album outside of the U.S. and Canada.

== Critical reception ==
Professional ratings
Review scores
Source	Rating
AllMusic	5/5 stars
The A.V. Club	A
Christgau's Record Guide	A−
The Guardian	5/5 stars
Mojo	4/5 stars
Pitchfork	9.1/10
PopMatters	9/10
Rolling Stone	4.5/5 stars
The Rolling Stone Album Guide	4/5 stars
Spin Alternative Record Guide	10/10

Although not a commercial success, Crazy Rhythms was critically acclaimed on release. In the UK, Paul Du Noyer of NME said that the record was "a very good album. I think it might even be a great one." He observed that the band "sound like Jonathan Richman trying to sound like the Velvet Underground", as well as Talking Heads, but that "somehow the way they are so derivative is part of the Feelies' appeal". Du Noyer described the music as "a kind of cleanly suburban rock'n'roll which is simultaneously intense and simplistic" and that the band seemed like "boys next door" but "they're nothing of the sort". In a five-star review in Sounds, Pete Silverton observed that for him, the album only worked when he listened to it alone, not with company, and that it blended "the drive of Richman's 'Roadrunner' and some of the tense meanderings of Television". He summed up the album as "all light and fun over driving but muted city beats – a little jazz here, a little Latin American there and virtually no rock and roll; most every rhythmic play you can hear on New York radio, topped by cool, calm and collected vocals". David Hepworth, in Smash Hits, wrote that the band "have the power to really draw you into their strange little suburban world." Melody Maker's James Truman was less enthused, stating that the band's aim was to achieve a balance of being "intellectual, neurotic cissy" and ironic "Good American", but that at times "Crazy Rhythms pushes too hard to get the balance right and falls uneasily between a send-up and a put-on, a masterpiece and an attractive, disposable novelty". Truman said that the album had "a fussier, more detailed sound than it needed", and concluded, "Conceptualists will love the Feelies ... I just wish they'd come on a little less coy and clever."

In their retrospective review, British newspaper The Guardian called Crazy Rhythms "one of those albums during whose course you hear the most exciting sound in music: things changing." Beat called it an art punk album, and Rolling Stone branded it "a landmark of jangly, guitar-driven avant-pop, and its shimmering sound can still be heard in bands like R.E.M." PopMatters wrote that the album "stands as a wildly inventive and influential record that stands shoulder to shoulder with some of the best music of the American post-punk era. With their very first album, The Feelies managed to speak directly to the zeitgeist of the American independent underground without becoming overexposed or repetitive." Tiny Mix Tapes wrote, "Crazy Rhythms, released in April 1980 amongst a veritable shitstorm of like-minded groups, stands grinning madly at the top of the pile – a shining monument to new wave at its quirky best."

=== Accolades ===
Crazy Rhythms was placed at number 17 in The Village Voice's annual Pazz & Jop critics' poll in 1980. In 2020, Rolling Stone included Crazy Rhythms in their "80 Greatest albums of 1980" list.

Crazy Rhythms was ranked number 49 in Rolling Stone's list of the 100 best albums of the 1980s,, number 69 on Pitchfork's list, and number 79 on Uncut's list.

== Track listing ==
All tracks are written by Bill Million and Glenn Mercer, except where indicated.

Side one
No.	Title	Length
1.	"The Boy with the Perpetual Nervousness"	5:10
2.	"Fa Cé-La"	2:04
3.	"Loveless Love"	5:14
4.	"Forces at Work"	7:10

Side two
No.	Title	Writer(s)	Length
5.	"Original Love"		2:55
6.	"Everybody's Got Something to Hide (Except Me and My Monkey)"	Lennon–McCartney	4:18
7.	"Moscow Nights"		4:34
8.	"Raised Eyebrows"		3:00
9.	"Crazy Rhythms"		6:13

CD reissue bonus track
No.	Title	Writer(s)	Length
10.	"Paint It Black" (recorded 1990)	Mick Jagger; Keith Richards	2:54

2009 Domino reissue bonus tracks
No.	Title	Writer(s)	Length
11.	"Fa Ce-La" (single version)
12.	"The Boy with the Perpetual Nervousness" (Carla Bley demo version)
13.	"Moscow Nights" (Carla Bley demo version)
14.	"Crazy Rhythms" (live from the 9:30 Club, Washington D.C., March 14, 2009)
15.	"I Wanna Sleep in Your Arms" (live from the 9:30 Club, Washington D.C., March 14, 2009)	Jonathan Richman

== Personnel ==
- Glenn Mercer – lead, rhythm, 12-string and bowed guitars; vocals; keyboards; temple block; shaker; claves; maracas; bell; castanets; reverbed sticks; shoes; drums; coat rack
- Bill Million – lead, rhythm, and acoustic guitars; vocals; timbales; sandpaper; claves; can; tom-tom; snare; cowbell; shaker; shoes, temple blocks; tambourine; boxes; and bells
- Keith De Nunzio – bass guitar, snare drum, tom-toms, wood block, pipe, bell, and background vocals (except on "Paint It Black")
- Anton Fier – drums, tom-toms, pipe, cowbell (except on "Paint It Black")
- Brenda Sauter – bass guitar, background vocals on "Paint It Black"
- Dave Weckerman – percussion on "Paint It Black"
- Stanley Demeski – drums on "Paint It Black"

== Influence of cover ==
The cover to Weezer's first album (1994) has been frequently compared to Crazy Rhythms.

== Charts ==
Chart (2009)	Peak position
Dutch Albums (Album Top 100)	75
