= The Slugs =

Rock band from Chicago active 1983 through the early 2000s

- Origin: Chicago, Illinois, United States
- Genres: Rock
- Years active: 1983–2010
- Labels: Pravda Records; Famous Mistakes
- Members: Dag Juhlin; Gregg Juhlin; Johnny L.; Mike Halston
- Past members: Al Paulson; Tristan Gallagher
- Website: Official website

The Slugs were an American rock band from Chicago, Illinois, United States. Starting in 1983, the band played power pop influenced by bands such as The Who, NRBQ, XTC and The Smithereens.

== Formation and members ==
The Slugs were started by brothers Dag (guitar) and Gregg (bass) Juhlin and their friend, guitarist Al Paulson in Park Ridge, Illinois. In the early 1980s, the trio placed an ad for a drummer that was answered by Chicago native Mike Halston, with the band officially formed on March 5, 1983. Al Paulson eventually left the group, and English vocalist Tristan Gallagher joined but left in 1985. In the 1990s, Johnny L (born John Lukashevich) joined the band as a guitarist.

== Music ==
The group put out their first single, "Walking in Circles/Give Me a Sunday", in 1986 on Susstones Records, and then a second single, "Back to the Playground/Now They Can All Lie Down", was issued on Pravda Records in 1987.

In 1988, while still a trio, the Slugs put out their first album, Non-Stop Holiday, on Pravda Records. The record sleeve displayed a photograph of an adolescent Mike Halston.

The band subsequently released two more albums: Fort Fun (1992, Pravda Records) and Junior (2000, Famous Mistakes Records).

== Reunions ==
The band announced that they would reunite on January 22, 2010 for one show at the Abbey Pub in Chicago to celebrate Pravda Records' 25th anniversary, along with Pravda bands the Service and Boom Hank.

On June 25, 2022, the band reunited to play PravdaFest, a celebration of the 38th anniversary of the founding of Pravda Records.

== Discography ==
=== Albums ===
- Non-Stop Holiday (Pravda, 1988)
- Fort Fun (Pravda, 1992)
- Junior (Pravda, 2000)

=== Singles ===
- "Walking In Circles" b/w "Give Me Strength" (Susstones, 1980)
- "Back To The Playgrounds" b/w "Now They Can All Lie Down" (Pravda, 1987)

=== Compilation appearances ===
- 20 Explosive Dynamic Super Smash Hit Explosions! (Pravda, 1991) - "Hooked On A Feeling"
- Super Fantastic Mega Smash Hits! (Attic/Limited, 1995) - "Hooked On A Feeling"
- 20 Supersonic Mega Explosive Hits (Runt, 1995) - "Hooked On A Feeling"
- 1985-1995 Pravda Records 10-Year Anniversary Compilation (Pravda, 1995) - "Breathe, Don't Push"
- Super Fantastic Mega Smash Hits cassette (Pravda/Backyard, 1995) - "Hooked On A Feeling"
- Urbs In Horto: A Chicago Indiepop Compilation (Johann's Face, 2003) - "Honey Rose"
- Flushed Away Original Motion Picture Soundtrack (Astralwerks, 2006) - "Ice Cold Rita"
- The Farmer's Weather CDr (Zero Qualms, 2017) - "I Don't Like Slugs"
