= Everything and More (Billy Gilman album) =

Studio album by Billy Gilman
- Released: May 3, 2005
- Genre: Country
- Length: 47:50
- Label: Image Entertainment
- Producer: Sandy Linzer

Billy Gilman chronology
Music Through Heartsongs (2003)	Everything and More (2005)	Billy Gilman (2006)

Singles from Everything and More
- 1. "Everything and More" Released: February 21, 2005; 2. "Hey, Little Suzie (The Cause of All That)" Released: July 12, 2005; 3. "Looked Into The Wings" Released: September 28, 2005

Professional ratings
Review scores
Source	Rating
AllMusic	2.5/5 stars

Everything and More is the fourth studio album by the American country music singer Billy Gilman, released in 2005 as his first album for Image Entertainment. "Hey, Little Suzie" and the title track were both released as singles, although neither reached the charts.

== Track listing ==
No.	Title	Writer(s)	Length
1.	"Hey, Little Suzie (The Cause of All That)"	Edward B. Kessel, Sandy Linzer	3:42
2.	"Everything and More"	Linzer, Allen Shamblin, Madeline Stone, Orrin Hatch, Star Saylor	3:58
3.	"Peaceable Kingdom"	Rob Carlson	4:51
4.	"Coming Home"	Jeffrey Franzel, Andrew Fromm, Lizner	4:13
5.	"Is Anybody Out There"	Kessel, Lizner	4:41
6.	"Looked into the Wings"	Franzel, Fromm, Lizner	3:49
7.	"Three Words, Two Hearts, One Kiss"	Lizner, Stone, Bo Allen	2:47
8.	"Pray for Him"	Lizner, Stone	3:52
9.	"I'm Not Me Anymore"	Kessel, Lizner	4:25
10.	"Missed You on Sunday"	Kessel, Lizner	3:57
11.	"Something 'bout Heaven"	Kessel, Lizner	3:45
12.	"Awaken the Music"	Kessel, Lizner	3:50
Total length:			47:50

== Personnel ==
- Bruce Bouton – pedal steel guitar
- Joe Chemay – bass guitar
- Thom Flora – background vocals
- Billy Gilman – lead vocals
- Tommy Harden – drums
- Jeff King – electric guitar
- Paul Leim – drums
- Chris Leuzinger – electric guitar
- Jimmy Nichols – organ, piano, synthesizer, string arrangements
- John Wesley Ryles – background vocals
- Hank Singer – mandolin
- Marty Slayton – background vocals
- Michael Spriggs – acoustic guitar
- Russell Terrell – background vocals
- Cindy Walker – background vocals
- Fletcher Watson – acoustic guitar
- Curtis Wright – background vocals
- Curtis Young – background vocals

== Chart performance ==
Chart (2005)	Peak position
US Top Country Albums (Billboard)	39
US Independent Albums (Billboard)	17
