= The Feelies =

American rock band

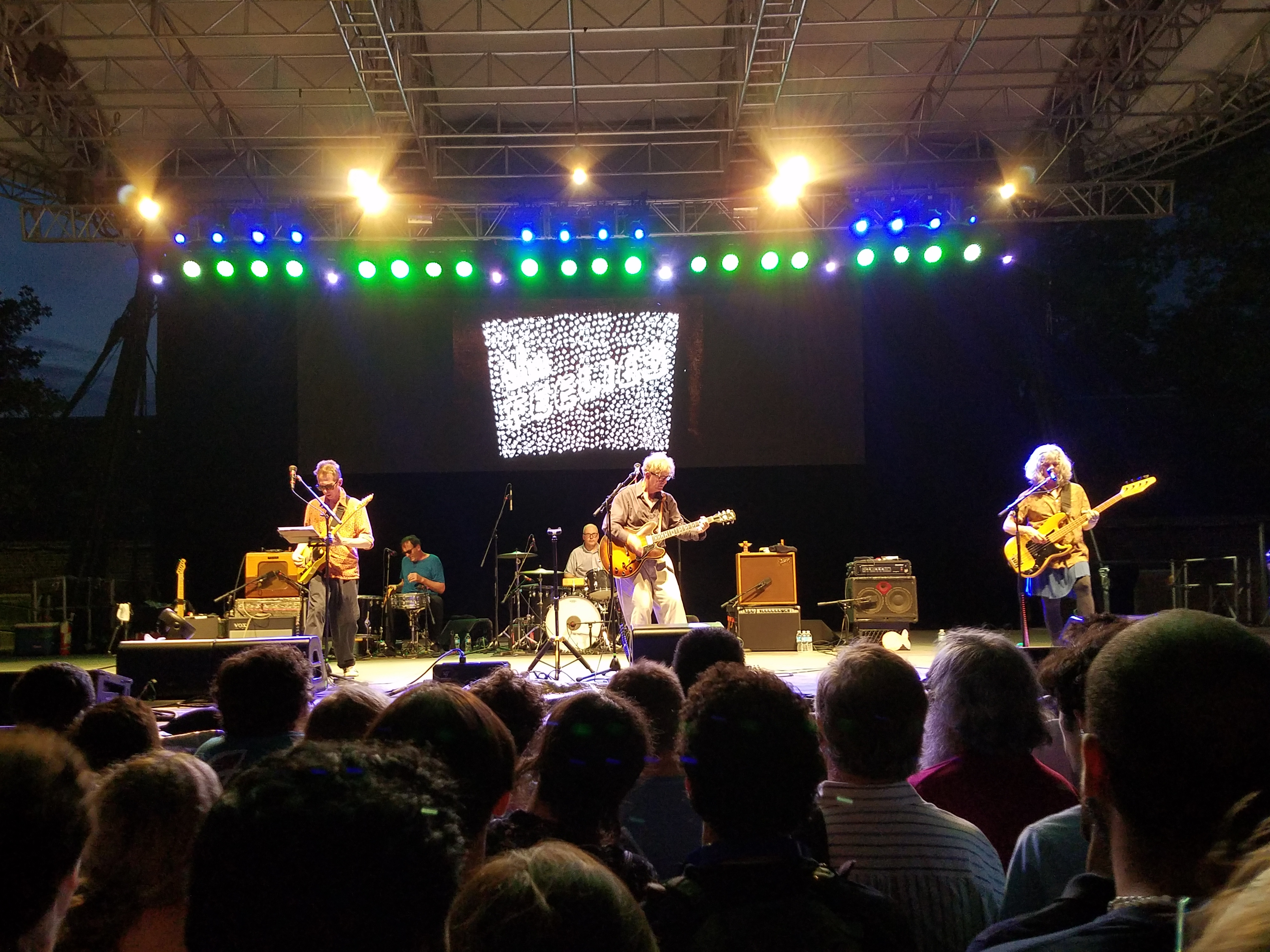
- The Feelies performing in Central Park on July 18, 2016

Background information
- Origin: Haledon, New Jersey, U.S.
- Genres: Post-punk; jangle pop
- Years active: 1976–1992; 2008–present
- Labels: Stiff; Coyote; Rough Trade; A&M; Bar/None
- Members: Glenn Mercer; Bill Million; Dave Weckerman; Brenda Sauter; Stan Demeski
- Past members: Keith DeNunzio; Anton Fier; Vinny DeNunzio; Charles Beasley; John Papesca
- Website: thefeeliesweb.com

The Feelies are an American rock band from Haledon, New Jersey. They formed in 1976 and disbanded in 1992 after having released four albums. The band reunited in 2008, and released new albums in 2011 and 2017.

Although not commercially successful, the Feelies had an influence on the development of American indie rock. Their first album, Crazy Rhythms (1980), was cited by R.E.M. as influencing their sound. The Feelies were influenced by the Beatles, the Velvet Underground and Lou Reed.

The Feelies rarely worked with outside producers, although Peter Buck of R.E.M. co-produced their second album, The Good Earth, one of their most successful albums. They frequently played at Maxwell's, a live music venue and bar/restaurant in Hoboken, during the 1980s.

== Early history ==
Glenn Mercer, Bill Million, Dave Weckerman and vocalist Richard Reilly began playing together in 1976 in Haledon, New Jersey, in a band called the Outkids. The Outkids evolved into the Feelies with the addition of Vinny DeNunzio on drums and Keith Denunzio on bass. The band's name is taken from the "feelie", a fictional entertainment device described in Aldous Huxley's Brave New World.

In 1978, Vinny DeNunzio left the band and shortly after John Piccarella of The Village Voice dubbed the then-unsigned Feelies "The Best Underground Band in New York". Anton Fier, who had just arrived to New York from Cleveland, joined the band through a mutual acquaintance, Charles Beasley, who was briefly a percussionist in the Feelies. With the line-up of Mercer, Million, DeNunzio, and Fier on drums, the Feelies released their first single, "Fa Cé-La", on Rough Trade Records in 1979.

The Feelies' debut album, Crazy Rhythms, was released on Stiff Records in 1980, featuring the same line-up as on the "Fa Cé-La" Rough Trade single.

== First hiatus and early offshoots ==
After Crazy Rhythms, Fier stated his desire to leave the band and join the Lounge Lizards as their full-time drummer. Keith DeNunzio left the band. With the Feelies in limbo, Mercer and Million collaborated with other local New Jersey musicians, forming one of a number of Feelies offshoots, The Trypes, featuring some once and future Feelies members, including Brenda Sauter, Dave Weckerman and Stanley Demeski, as well as John Baumgartner, Marc Francia and Toni Paruta. The Trypes, quieter and more psychedelic than the Feelies, played regular live gigs around the New York/Hoboken scene at clubs such as Maxwell's and Folk City. In 1984, Coyote Records released the Trypes 12" EP, Music for Neighbors, produced by Million and Mercer, The Explorers Hold, featuring three original songs (credited to Mercer alone or with other band members), plus a cover of the George Harrison song "Love You To", which originally had appeared on the Beatles' Revolver. The Trypes also contributed a Million/Mercer-produced original song, "A Plan Revised", to the 1985 Coyote anthology of Hoboken acts, Luxury Condos Coming To Your Neighborhood Soon. Some members of the Trypes later formed the band Speed The Plough. Acute Records reissued the Music for Neighbors LP in 2012, which quickly sold out. Pravda Records re-reissued it in 2022 and it is also available as a digital release on Bandcamp along with their Live at Maxwell's 1984.

Million, Mercer, Sauter, Demeski and Baumgartner also gigged around New York and Hoboken under the name Yung Wu, which was fronted by and featured the songs of Feelies' percussionist Dave Weckerman, who also sang lead. Yung Wu released one album on Coyote Records in 1986, titled Shore Leave. It featured Weckerman originals, plus covers of "Big Day", "Child of the Moon", and "Powderfinger", a staple of their live gigs.

The Willies, also known as the Willies From Haledon, were yet another Feelies offshoot that played around the New York/Hoboken clubs in the early 1980s. The Willies shared a similar lineup as the later Feelies, but their live sets consisted mostly of cover songs, extended instrumentals and psychedelic jams, such as "Third Stone From the Sun" and "Sedan Delivery". The Feelies' appearance in Jonathan Demme's Something Wild was credited to the Willies.

== Mid-period (1980–1992) ==
The members of the Feelies never stopped playing and collaborating in the 1980s, earning them the distinction of being "the New York area's best-loved underground rockers since the late 1970s", according to Jon Pareles of The New York Times in 1986. The band occasionally even performed under The Feelies name, often on holidays at Maxwell's. At least one such gig on May Day 1983 featured a reunion of the Crazy Rhythms line-up of Million, Mercer, DeNunzio and Fier. By the late 1980s, the band re-emerged from their self-imposed exile with new members and their first new album in six years.

Reformed as a quintet featuring Mercer, Million, Weckerman, Sauter and Demeski, the Feelies recorded The Good Earth in 1985 with Peter Buck of R.E.M. on board as co-producer with Mercer and Million. The album was released in 1986 and featured ten original Mercer/Million compositions. The band toured in support of the album as an opening band for Lou Reed as well as R.E.M. that year.

In 1988, the Feelies signed to a major label and released the album Only Life on A&M Records. The lineup was the same as The Good Earth, and Mercer and Million again handled production duties. The disc was a critical favorite, coming in at No. 27 on The Village Voice's 1988 Pazz & Jop critics' poll. Recently, the album's title track has been used as the introductory music for the Harvard Business Review's HBR Idea Cast.

The band's final album before a hiatus, Time for a Witness, was released on A&M in 1991. The album broke little new ground from Only Life but still earned the band critical praise.

In 1994, Weckerman and Mercer started their project, Wake Ooloo, with their first album being Hear No Evil. A European tour took place in 1995.

== Later period (2008–present) ==
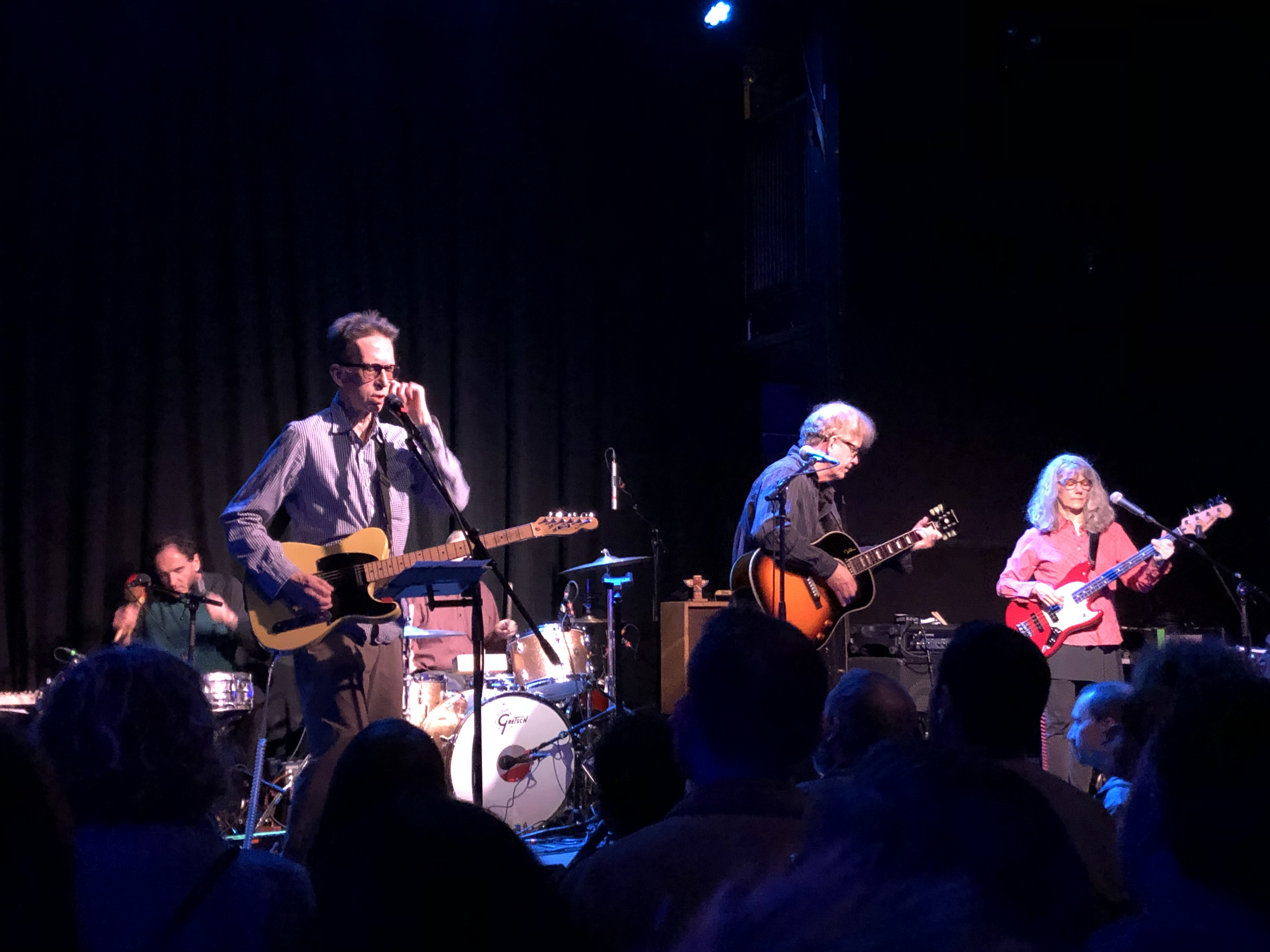
- The Feelies performing at Rough Trade Brooklyn on May 3, 2019.

The band played reunion shows in the summer and fall of 2008. A performance at Battery Park in NYC with Sonic Youth followed several warm-up shows at Maxwell's. In June 2009, the band performed an acoustic show at the Whitney Museum. They also headlined a show at Millennium Park in Chicago. In September 2009, they performed Crazy Rhythms live in its entirety as part of the All Tomorrow's Parties-curated Don't Look Back series.

Bar/None Records reissued Crazy Rhythms and The Good Earth on September 8, 2009. Domino Records reissued both albums outside of the U.S. and Canada.

In March 2011, the Feelies released their first record in 20 years, Here Before, which was produced by Bill Million and Glenn Mercer for the Bar/None record label. The band remains "one of the nation's most beloved alternative-rock bands."

The Feelies have reunited sporadically over the last two decades to play concerts at their early home at Maxwell's. On June 10, 2016, for the band's 40th anniversary the Feelies performed with their original line-up of Mercer, Million, and the DeNunzio brothers.

The Feelies sixth studio album, In Between, was released in February 2017, also on the Bar/None label. Reviews were generally favorable, with Metacritic calculating an average critical rating of 81%.

A reunited Feelies played at Wilco's every-other-year festival, Solid Sound, in North Adams, MA, in June 2019.

In November 2022, the Feelies performed a tribute concert for Anton Fier following his death, and were joined on-stage by Keith DeNunzio on bass.

In October 2023, the Feelies released a Velvet Underground cover album entitled Some Kinda Love: Performing The Music Of The Velvet Underground. It featured covers of 18 songs and was released on the Bar/None label. The recording itself comes from a performance at White Eagle Hall in Jersey City, New Jersey, on October 13, 2018.

== Film appearances ==
The band was featured in the 1986 Jonathan Demme film Something Wild, playing a band at a high school reunion. Credited as "The Willies", they performed bits of five songs, including "Crazy Rhythms" and "Loveless Love", as well as covers of David Bowie's "Fame" and the Monkees' "I'm a Believer" (written by Neil Diamond).

No Feelies songs appeared on the Something Wild soundtrack, but their song "Too Far Gone" was included on the Married to the Mob soundtrack, another Demme film. Million and Mercer were also brought together by director Susan Seidelman to create the score for her debut feature-film, Smithereens. Demme included the song "Let's Go" from the band's second album, Good Earth, in his 2002 film, The Truth About Charlie; it is also featured on the soundtrack of Noah Baumbach's 2005 film The Squid and the Whale, and the 2023 film Robot Dreams.

Their song "When Company Comes" from their Good Earth album was featured in the 2018 film The Miseducation of Cameron Post.

== Side projects and alumni bands ==
- Wild Carnation, featuring Brenda Sauter and her husband Richard Barnes (both also of Speed The Plough), has released two albums: Tricycle and Superbus.
- Wake Ooloo featured Mercer and Weckerman, and released three albums with both Mercer and Weckerman on vocals through Chicago-based record label Pravda Records.
- Anton Fier formed the Golden Palominos and toured with Bob Mould.
- Stanley Demeski joined and toured with the band Luna.
- Demeski, Weckerman, and Mercer have been playing in a band called the Sunburst with former Speed The Plough members Marc Francia, Toni Paruta, and John Baumgartner.
- The Trypes featured members of The Feelies plus Elbrus Kelemet, John Baumgartner, Toni Baumgartner, Marc Francia and released an EP in 1984.
- Glenn Mercer's debut solo CD was released by Pravda Records in May 2007. It includes performances by Stanley Demeski, Vinny DeNunzio, Dave Weckerman, Anton Fier, and Brenda Sauter.
- Vinny DeNunzio played drums and co-wrote a song on former Television guitarist Richard Lloyd's first solo album, Alchemy.

== Musical style and legacy ==
AllMusic referred to the Feelies as "heroes of the 1980s indie underground". Their sound has been described as "noisy" and "droning" avant-garde pop. One of their greatest influences was the Velvet Underground, closing their third album, Only Life, with a cover of the band's song "What Goes On".

== Band members ==
- Glenn Mercer – guitars, vocals, keyboards, percussion (1976–1991, 2008–present)
- Bill Million – guitars, vocals, percussion (1976–1991, 2008–present)
- Stan Demeski – drums and percussion (1981–1991, 2008–present)
- Brenda Sauter – bass guitar, violin and backing vocals (1983–1991, 2008–present)
- Dave Weckerman – percussion, occasional vocals live (1976, 1984–1991, 2008–present)

Former

- Vinny DeNunzio – drums (1976–1978, one off live appearance 2016)
- Charles Beasley – percussion
- Keith DeNunzio (Keith Clayton) – bass guitar, percussion, background vocals (1976–1982, one off live appearances 1983, 2016, 2022 and 2025)
- Anton Fier (Andy Fisher) – drums, percussion (1978–1980, one off live appearance 1983; died 2022)
- John Papesca – bass guitar (early years)

== Discography ==
Studio albums

- Crazy Rhythms (Stiff LP 1980)
- The Good Earth (Coyote / Twin/Tone LP 1986)
- Only Life (A&M LP 1988)
- Time for a Witness (A&M LP 1991)
- Here Before (Bar/None CD 2011)
- In Between (Bar/None CD 2017)

Compilation

- Rewind (Bar/None LP 2025) (compilation of previously issued covers; an expanded version of the EP Uncovered)

Live album

- Some Kinda Love: Performing the Music of The Velvet Underground (Bar/None LP 2023)

Extended plays

- No One Knows (Coyote / Twin/Tone EP 1986)
- Higher Ground (A&M 1988)
- Uncovered (Bar/None 2016) (compilation of both newly recorded and previously issued covers; expanded into the LP Rewind)

Singles

Year	Title	Chart positions	Album
Year	Title	US Modern Rock	Album
1979	"Fa Cé La"		Crazy Rhythms
1988	"Away"	6	Only Life
1991	"Sooner or Later"	13	Time for a Witness
