= Dare to Dream (Billy Gilman album) =

Studio album by Billy Gilman
- Released: May 8, 2001
- Genre: Country; Christian; pop
- Length: 43:15
- Label: Epic
- Producer: Blake Chancey; David Malloy; Don Cook

Billy Gilman chronology
Classic Christmas (2000)	Dare to Dream (2001)	Music Through Heartsongs (2003)

Singles from Dare to Dream
- 1. "She's My Girl" Released: May 14, 2001; 2. "Elisabeth" Released: August 27, 2001

Professional ratings
Review scores
Source	Rating
Allmusic	3/5 stars

Dare to Dream is the second studio album by the American country music singer Billy Gilman, released in 2001 on Epic Records Nashville. Although its singles "Elisabeth" and "She's My Girl" both fell short of the Top 40 on the Billboard country singles charts, the album was certified Gold by the RIAA.

== Track listing ==
1. "She's My Girl" (Brian Baker, Zack Turner, Lonnie Wilson) – 3:08
2. "Our First Kiss" (Bonnie Baker, Bob DiPiero) – 3:11
3. "Elisabeth" (Kim Patton-Johnston, Liz Rose) – 4:22
4. "I've Got to Make It to Summer" (Don Cook, David Malloy) – 4:30
5. "My Time on Earth" (Tommy Conners, Adam Hughes, David Vincent Williams) – 4:26
6. "You Don't You Won't" (David Bassett, Michael Himelstein) – 3:28
7. "She's Everything You Want" (Mary Danna, Michael Gerald Lunn, Malloy) – 2:22
8. "God's Alive and Well" (Malloy, Bruce Roberts) – 4:28
9. "The Woman in My Life" (Cook, Bob Regan, Leslie Satcher) – 3:40
10. "Almost Love" (Tom Douglas, Marcus Hummon) – 4:14
11. "Some Things I Know" (Sally Barris, Burton Collins) – 2:36
12. "Shamey, Shamey, Shame" (Randle Chowing, Mark Morton, Alan Ross) – 2:50

=== Notable tracks ===
"Some Things I Know" was recorded by the country music singer James Bonamy for his 1997 album Roots and Wings. It was also recorded by the country singer Lee Ann Womack as a duet with Vince Gill three years before Gilman's recording (in 1998) and served as the title track for her album Some Things I Know.

== Personnel ==
- Mark Casstevens – acoustic guitar
- Eric Darken – percussion
- Billy Gilman – lead vocals
- Mike Haynes – trumpet
- Jim Horn – baritone saxophone, horn arrangements
- David Hungate – bass guitar
- John Barlow Jarvis – keyboards
- Alison Krauss – vocal ad-libs
- Michael Lunn – electric guitar
- Greg Morrow – drums
- The Nashville String Machine – strings
- Jimmy Nichols – keyboards, background vocals
- Billy Panda – acoustic guitar
- Greg Piccolo – tenor saxophone
- Michael Rhodes – bass guitar
- Brent Rowan – electric guitar
- Leslie Satcher – background vocals
- The Slugs – background vocals
- Havey Thompson – tenor saxophone
- Robby Turner – steel guitar
- Cindy Richardson-Walker – background vocals
- Bergen White – string arrangements
- Lonnie Wilson – background vocals

== Chart performance ==
=== Weekly charts ===
Chart (2001)	Peak position
US Billboard 200	45
US Top Country Albums (Billboard)	6

=== Year end charts ===
Chart (2001)	Position
Canadian Country Albums (Nielsen SoundScan)	74
US Top Country Albums (Billboard)	43

== Certifications and sales ==
Region	Certification	Certified units/sales
United States (RIAA)	Gold	500,000^{^}
^{^} Shipments figures based on certification alone.
