= One Voice (Billy Gilman album) =

Studio album by Billy Gilman
- Released: June 20, 2000
- Recorded: 1999–2000
- Studios: Soundshop Recording Studio 'A' (Nashville, TN)
- Genre: Country
- Length: 36:56
- Label: Epic Nashville
- Producers: Don Cook; David Malloy; Blake Chancey

Billy Gilman chronology
One Voice (2000)	Classic Christmas (2000)

Singles from One Voice
- 1. "One Voice" Released: May 27, 2000; 2. "Oklahoma" Released: October 9, 2000; 3. "There's a Hero" Released: March 2001

One Voice is the debut studio album by American country music singer Billy Gilman. The album was released on June 20, 2000, by Epic Records Nashville. The album was certified 2× Platinum by RIAA and was praised by the critics.

== Critical reception ==
Professional ratings
Review scores
Source	Rating
AllMusic	3.5/5 stars

AllMusic described Gilman as "a sort of country-style choir boy" and observed that he could "certainly carry a tune". They noted that the album's producers had mostly avoided the awkwardness of romantic lyrics sung by an 11-year-old by selecting "harmless material", but questioned the inclusion of "'Til I Can Make It on My Own". The website concluded by expressing hope that Gilman would not be "a has-been by the time his voice changes".

== Commercial performance ==
It reached number two on the Billboard Top Country Albums chart, and was certified 2× Platinum by RIAA. The highest-charting single from the album was its title track, which reached 20 on Hot Country Songs and 38 on the Billboard Hot 100. It made Gilman the youngest male artist in history (at 12 years old) to have a solo top 40 hit on the country charts.

== Track listing ==
No.	Title	Writer(s)	Producer(s)	Length
1.	"Little Things"	Bobby Goldsboro	Don Cook; Blake Chancey	2:25
2.	"I Think She Likes Me"	Bob Regan; George Teren	Cook; Chancey	3:07
3.	"What's Forever For"	Rafe Van Hoy	Cook; Chancey	3:27
4.	"One Voice"	Cook; David Malloy	Cook; Malloy; Chancey	4:09
5.	"Spend Another Night"	Skip Ewing; Malloy	Malloy; Chancey	3:46
6.	"Little Bitty Pretty One"	Robert Byrd	Malloy; Chancey	2:32
7.	"The Snake Song"	Bobby Braddock	Cook; Chancey	3:12
8.	"I Wanna Get to Ya"	Gary Baker; Frank J. Myers; Malloy	Malloy; Chancey	3:37
9.	"Oklahoma"	John Allen; D. Vincent Williams	Malloy; Chancey	4:04
10.	"There's a Hero"	Cook; John Barlow Jarvis	Cook; Chancey	3:26

Bonus track
No.	Title	Writer(s)	Producer(s)	Length
11.	"'Til I Can Make It on My Own"	George Richey; Billy Sherrill; Tammy Wynette	Malloy; Chancey	3:11

== Personnel ==
Credits for One Voice adapted from the album's liner notes.

Vocals

- Billy Gilman – lead vocals
- Wes Hightower – background vocals
- Liana Manis – background vocals
- Anthony Martin – background vocals
- Jimmy Nichols – background vocals
- Cindy Richardson-Walker – background vocals
- Lisa Silver – background vocals

Instruments

- Mark Casstevens – gut string guitar, acoustic guitar
- Eric Darken – percussion
- Larry Franklin – fiddle, mandolin
- Carl Gorodetzky – string contractor
- Jim Horn – horn arrangements, tenor saxophone
- John Barlow Jarvis – keyboards
- Blair Masters – drum loops
- Jerry McPherson – gut string guitar, acoustic guitar
- Greg Morrow – drums
- The Nashville String Machine – strings
- Jimmy Nichols – keyboards
- Steve Patrick – trumpet
- Michael Rhodes – bass guitar
- Tom Roady – percussion
- Charles Rose – trombone
- Brent Rowan – electric guitar
- Harvey Thompson – tenor saxophone
- Robby Turner – steel guitar
- Bergen White – string arrangements

Technical

- Mike Bradley – recording engineer
- Mark Capps – assistant engineering
- Derek Bason – additional engineering, vocal editing
- Tony Castle – additional engineering, vocal editing
- Graham Lewis – additional engineering
- Billy Sherrill – additional engineering
- Julian King – mixing
- George Massenburg – mixing
- Rich Hanson – assistant mixing
- Jenny Rosato – assistant mixing
- Denny Purcell – mastering
- Eric Conn – digital editing
- Carlos Grier – digital editing

Imagery

- Tracy Baskette – art direction
- Bill Johnson – art direction
- Eddie Malluk – cover photo
- Mary Beth Felts – hair/make-up
- Rudy Sotomayor – hair/make-up
- Marina Chavez – photography
- Renee Fowler – stylist
- Richie Owings – stylist

== Charts ==
=== Weekly charts ===
Chart (2000)	Peak position
Australian Albums (ARIA Charts)	77
Canadian Top Country Albums (RPM)	6
US Billboard 200	22
US Top Country Albums (Billboard)	2

=== Year end charts ===
Chart (2000)	Position
Canadian Albums (Nielsen SoundScan)	195
US Billboard 200	115
US Top Country Albums (Billboard)	14
Chart (2001)	Position
Canadian Country Albums (Nielsen SoundScan)	39
US Billboard 200	122
US Top Country Albums (Billboard)	10

== Certifications and sales ==
Region	Certification	Certified units/sales
Canada (Music Canada)	Gold	50,000^{^}
United States (RIAA)	2× Platinum	2,000,000^{^}
^{^} Shipments figures based on certification alone.
