= Billy Gilman (album) =

Studio album by Billy Gilman
- Released: September 5, 2006
- Genre: Country
- Length: 41:38
- Label: Image Entertainment
- Producer: Sandy Linzer

Billy Gilman chronology
Everything and More (2005)	Billy Gilman (2006)	The Voice: The Complete Season 11 Collection (2016)

Singles from Billy Gilman
- 1. "Gonna Find Love" Released: May 18, 2006; 2. "Southern Star" Released: July 27, 2006

Professional ratings
Review scores
Source	Rating
AllMusic	3.5/5 stars

Billy Gilman is the fifth studio album by the country music singer Billy Gilman, released in 2006 through Image Entertainment. "Gonna Find Love" and "Southern Star" were released as singles, although neither charted. The album reached number 55 on the Top Country Albums chart. It was Gilman's final release in the country genre.

== Track listing ==
No.	Title	Writer(s)	Length
1.	"Billy the Kid"	Salme Dahlstrom, Sandy Linzer, Madeline Stone	3:38
2.	"Southern Star"	Linzer, Edward B. Kessel	3:29
3.	"Let Me Remind You Again"	Linzer, David Wolfert	3:10
4.	"Gonna Find Love"	Dahlstrom, Linzer, Stone	3:22
5.	"Designated Driver"	Linzer, Wolfert	4:21
6.	"Clueless"	Kessel, Linzer	3:49
7.	"Easy for You"	Linzer, Wolfert	3:36
8.	"Almost Over (Gettin' Over You)" (featuring Pam Tillis)	Linzer, Wolfert	3:20
9.	"See Yourself in My Eyes"	Linzer, Wolfert	3:31
10.	"I Will"	Ron Ernest, Steve Hornbeak	3:45
11.	"Young Love"	Linzer, Wolfert	3:57
12.	"We Go On"	Dahlstrom, Linzer, Stone	3:40
Total length:			41:38

Wal-Mart bonus tracks
No.	Title	Writer(s)	Length
13.	"Moonlight Memories of You" (Cover of Barry Manilow)	Linzer, Irwin Levine	3:20
14.	"The One You Left Behind"		3:05
Total length:			47:23

== Personnel ==
- Monty Lane Allen – backing vocals
- Angela Bacari – backing vocals
- Larry Beaird – acoustic guitar
- Joe Chemay – bass guitar
- J.T. Corenflos – electric guitar
- Eric Darken – percussion
- Larry Franklin – fiddle
- Billy Gilman – lead and backing vocals
- Steve Hornbeak – keyboards, synthesizer strings, background vocals
- Paul Leim – drums
- Chris Leuzinger – electric guitar
- Jimmy Nichols – keyboards
- Kim Parent – backing vocals
- John Wesley Ryles – backing vocals
- Pam Tillis – duet vocals on "Almost Over (Gettin' Over You)"
- Cindy Walker – backing vocals
- Biff Watson – acoustic guitar
- Andrea Zonn – backing vocals

== Chart performance ==
Chart (2006)	Peak position
US Top Country Albums (Billboard)	55
US Independent Albums (Billboard)	29
