= Classic Christmas (Billy Gilman album) =

Studio album by Billy Gilman
- Released: October 17, 2000
- Genre: Country
- Label: Epic
- Producer: Blake Chancey, David Malloy, Don Cook

Billy Gilman chronology
One Voice (2000)	Classic Christmas (2000)	Dare to Dream (2001)

Singles from One Voice
- 1. "Warm & Fuzzy" Released: October 10, 2000

Classic Christmas is an album of Christmas music by the country music singer Billy Gilman, released in 2000 on Epic Records. It was certified Gold by the RIAA. "Warm & Fuzzy" was released as a single and reached #50 on the Billboard Country chart.

== Track listing ==
1. "White Christmas" — 4:06
2. "Warm & Fuzzy" — 3:14
3. "Winter Wonderland" – 2:43
4. "The Christmas Song" – 4:01
5. "There's a New Kid in Town" – 4:13
6. "Jingle Bell Rock" – 2:15
7. "Rockin' Around the Christmas Tree" – 2:18
8. "Angels We Have Heard on High" – 2:54
9. "Silent Night"– 2:25
10. "Away in a Manger" – 2:36
11. "Sleigh Ride" – 2:30
  - feat. Charlotte Church
12. "O Holy Night" – 3:56

== Personnel ==
- Tim Akers – keyboards
- Sam Bacco – percussion
- Jeff Bailey – trumpet
- John Brough – background vocals
- Travis Cottrell – choir, background vocals
- Jackie Cusic – choir
- Mark Douthit – flute, saxophone
- Chris Dunn – trombone
- Jana King Evans – choir, background vocals
- Gail Farrell – choir
- James Ferguson – choir
- Larry Franklin – fiddle, mandolin
- Billy Gilman – lead vocals
- Barry Green – trombone
- Mike Haynes – trumpet
- John Hobbs – keyboards
- Jim Horn – clarinet, flute, recorder, saxophone, woodwind, horn arrangements
- Sarah Huffman – choir
- Jon Mark Ivey – choir, background vocals
- Robert Jason – choir
- Marabeth Jordan – choir, background vocals
- Bonnie Keen – choir
- Jennifer Kummer – french horn
- Shane McConnell – choir
- Chris McDonald – trombone
- Jerry McPherson – electric guitar
- Greg Morrow – drums, percussion
- The Nashville String Machine – strings
- Louis Dean Nunley – choir
- Billy Panda – acoustic guitar, steel guitar
- Linda Patterson – french horn
- Michael Rhodes – bass guitar
- Cindy Richardson-Walker – choir
- Gary Robinson – choir
- John Wesley Ryles – background vocals
- Lisa Silver – choir, background vocals
- Denis Solee – clarinet, flute, saxophone, woodwind
- George Tidwell – trumpet
- Robby Turner – steel guitar, background vocals
- Bergen White – string arrangements, conductor
- Dennis Wilson – choir, background vocals
- Bill Woodworth – oboe
- Cynthia Wyatt – harp

== Charts ==
=== Weekly charts ===
Chart (2000)	Peak position
US Billboard 200	42
US Top Country Albums (Billboard)	4
US Top Holiday Albums (Billboard)	5

==== Year end charts ====
Chart (2001)	Position
US Country Albums (Billboard)	25

== Certifications and sales ==
Region	Certification	Certified units/sales
United States (RIAA)	Gold	500,000^{^}
^{^} Shipments figures based on certification alone.
