= Billy Gilman =

American singer (born 1988)

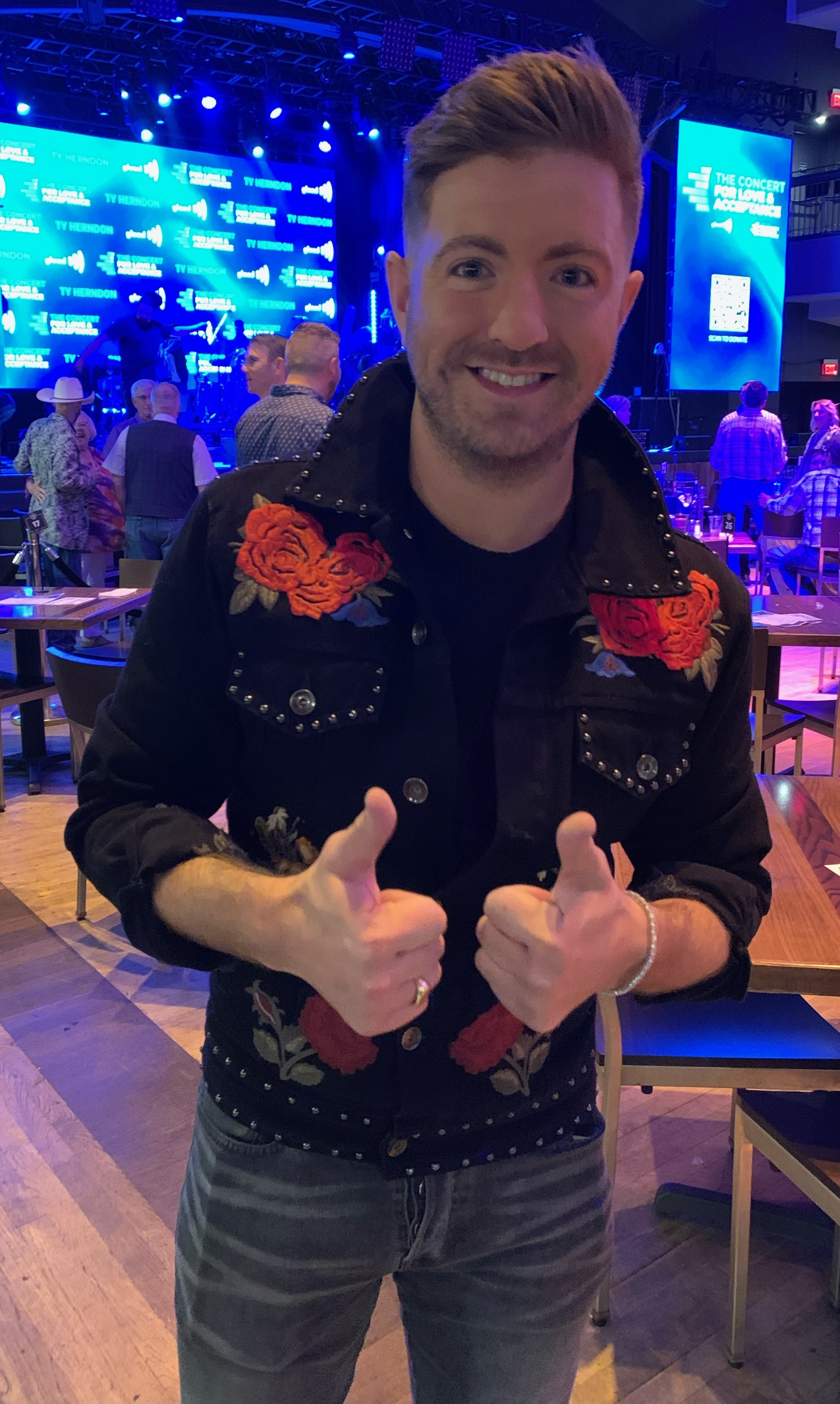
- Billy Gilman at Wildhorse Saloon, 2023

Background information
- Born: William Wendell Gilman III; May 24, 1988 (age 38); Westerly, Rhode Island, U.S.
- Origin: Richmond, Rhode Island, U.S.
- Genres: Country; bluegrass; pop
- Instrument: Vocals
- Years active: 1999–present
- Labels: Epic; Image Entertainment; EMG
- Spouse: Anthony Carbone (m. 2024)
- Website: www.billygilman.com

William Wendell Gilman III (born May 24, 1988) is an American country music singer. Starting as a young country artist, he is known for his debut single "One Voice", a Top 40 hit on the Billboard Hot 100 and a Top 20 hit on the Billboard Hot Country Songs chart in 2000. He has released five albums, including three for Epic Nashville. In 2016, Gilman auditioned for season 11 of the US edition of The Voice and competed as part of Team Adam Levine, finishing as runner-up for the season. He also performed Michael Jackson's song "Ben" at Michael's 30th Anniversary Celebration of his solo years.

== Early life ==
William Wendell Gilman III was born on May 24, 1988, in Westerly, Rhode Island. He was raised in Hope Valley, Rhode Island, in the town of Richmond. He is the son of Frances "Fran" (Woodmansee) and William Wendell "Bill" Gilman Jr., who works in maintenance. Gilman began singing before he was in school, and gave his first public performance at the age of seven. At the age of nine, Gilman was discovered by Ray Benson of Asleep at the Wheel, who helped him record demos. Gilman was then signed to Epic Records Nashville in 2000.

== Career ==
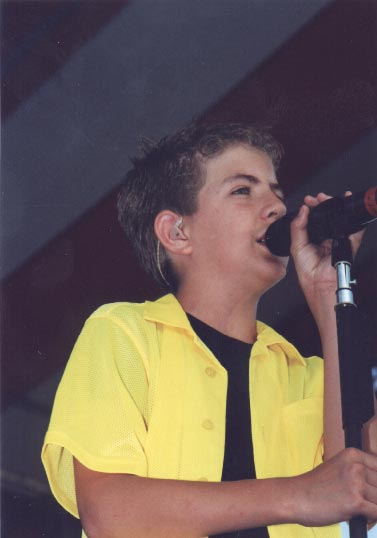
Gilman in Boston, Massachusetts, in 2000.

Gilman's debut single "One Voice", became a Top 40 hit on the Billboard Hot 100 peaking at No. 38. It also became a top 20 hit on the Billboard Hot Country Songs chart in 2000. Eleven years old at the time, he became the youngest artist to ever have a Top 40 single on the country chart.

His debut album, also called One Voice was released on June 20, 2000, on Epic Records, and was certified double platinum in the United States. The album included the title track "One Voice" and the follow-up singles "Oklahoma" and "There's a Hero". The single "Oklahoma" was released on October 9, 2000, making it to the Billboard Hot Country Songs Top 40 peaking at No. 33. It also cracked the main Hot 100 chart peaking at No. 63.

Gilman was nominated for a Grammy Award for Best Male Country Vocal Performance for his debut single "One Voice" and was nominated for Best Country Song for the songwriters, Don Cook and David Malloy.

Gilman released a Christmas album in 2000 titled Classic Christmas, which went gold, followed on May 8, 2001, by his second album Dare to Dream, which was certified gold, although its singles "Elisabeth" and "She's My Girl" both fell short of Top 40 on the Billboard country singles charts peaking at Nos. 50 and 56, respectively. After Dare to Dream, Gilman's voice began to noticeably change because of the onset of puberty, forcing him temporarily to withdraw from singing.

His final album for Epic was released on April 15, 2003, and was titled Music Through Heartsongs: Songs Based on the Poems of Mattie J.T. Stepanek. The tracks were based on poems written by the child poet Mattie Stepanek, a poet with muscular dystrophy who died in 2004, almost one year after the album's release.

Gilman signed to Image Entertainment in 2005 for the release of his fifth album, Everything and More. A self-titled album Billy Gilman followed in 2006.

== The Voice ==
In 2016, Gilman auditioned for season 11 of the US edition of The Voice. The emotional introduction piece showed him with his supportive parents clearly introducing him as a child star and the fact that he had come out as gay in 2014. He was shown declaring to The Voice host Carson Daly backstage: "I had to come to grips with being gay... I took a long time to rebuild vocally, but it was coming back, and then coming to grips with who I was personally, I also came to grips with who I was as a singer. You know, I love my country music roots, but deep down, I really always wanted to be a pop singer. It's actually nerve-racking to stand here and just be 100 percent me. There's only one shot to reinvent myself."

In the blind audition broadcast on September 20, 2016, Gilman sang Adele's song "When We Were Young". Gilman impressed all four judges, Adam Levine, Miley Cyrus, Alicia Keys and Blake Shelton with his performance. Adam Levine was the first to turn his chair around soon after Gilman started singing, with Miley Cyrus following shortly thereafter. Blake Shelton and Alicia Keys turned around at the very end of the performance. Once Gilman introduced himself to the coaches, both Shelton and Cyrus said they recognized him from his childhood career with Shelton mentioning Gilman's hit "One Voice". Gilman chose to continue the competition as part of Team Adam Levine.

In the battle round, Levine matched Gilman with teammate Andrew DeMuro both performing Michael Jackson's "Man in the Mirror" and opted for Gilman to stay for the knockouts round where he confronted teammate Ponciano Seoane singing "Fight Song". Levine opted to pick him for the live rounds. In the inaugural live playoffs broadcast, he sang "Crying" from Roy Orbison and was one of two contestants from Team Adam to be saved by the public vote the other being his teammate Josh Gallagher. Based on this vote, he moved to the top 12 live stage of the competition.

In the first live show, he sang Queen's "The Show Must Go On". followed in week two of live shows by "All I Ask" from Adele and in week three by "Anyway" from Martina McBride all three with a standing ovation from the public and from all four judges. "Anyway" reached number four on iTunes allowing Gilman the advantage of multiplying the vote (sales) totals he got on the iTunes chart published immediately after the broadcast by five. In the semi-final, he performed "I Surrender" from Celine Dion, again with standing ovation from all four judges. For a second week in a row, Gilman's performance, this time for "I Surrender" featured at number one on iTunes allowing him to benefit from the five times multipliers vote totals again. On December 6, 2016, Gilman qualified to the final of season 11 of The Voice.

In the final four broadcast on December 12, 2016, Gilman performed "My Way", a cover of Frank Sinatra, then performed "Bye Bye Love" from The Everly Brothers as a duet with his coach and mentor Adam Levine, to finish with his original, "Because of Me", which was originally going to be a Maroon 5 track, but Levine decided it would be an appropriate winner's song for Gilman. Closing the finale broadcast on December 13, Gilman became the season 11 runner-up when Sundance Head was declared the winner.

=== Performances on The Voice ===
– Studio version of performance reached the top 10 on iTunes.

Show	Order	Song	Original artist	Result
Blind Audition	2.6	"When We Were Young"	Adele	All judges, Adam Levine, Miley Cyrus, Alicia Keys and Blake Shelton turned Billy joined Adam Levine's Team
Battle Rounds (Top 48)	7.5	"Man in the Mirror" (vs. Andrew DeMuro)	Michael Jackson	Saved by coach
Knockout Rounds (Top 32)	12.2	"Fight Song" (vs. Ponciano Seoane)	Rachel Platten	Saved by coach. Qualified to the live shows
Live Playoffs (Top 20)	15.20	"Crying"	Roy Orbison	Saved by public vote. Qualified to Top 12
Live Show (Top 12)	16.5	"The Show Must Go On"	Queen	Saved by public vote. Qualified to Top 11.
Live Show (Top 11)	18.6	"All I Ask"	Adele	Saved by public vote. Qualified to Top 10.
Live Show (Top 10)	20.1	"Anyway"	Martina McBride	Saved by public vote. Qualified to Top 8 (Semi-final).
Live Show (Top 8 – Semi-final)	22.8	"I Surrender"	Celine Dion	Saved by public vote. Qualified to Top 4 (Final).
Live Show (Top 4 – Final)	24.1	"My Way"	Frank Sinatra	Runner-up
Live Show (Top 4 – Final)	24.5	"Bye Bye Love" (duet with coach Adam Levine)	The Everly Brothers	Runner-up
Live Show (Top 4 – Final)	24.11	"Because of Me"	Billy Gilman (original)	Runner-up

Non-competition performances
Order	Collaborator(s)	Song	Original artist
17.1	Adam Levine, Brendan Fletcher, and Josh Gallagher	"For What It's Worth"	Buffalo Springfield
22.3	Christian Cuevas	"Unsteady"	X Ambassadors
25.4	Billy Gilman with Christian Cuevas, Ali Caldwell, Courtney Harrell and Sa'Rayah	"Proud Mary"	Creedence Clearwater Revival
25.9	Billy Gilman with Kelly Clarkson	"It's Quiet Uptown"	Hamilton musical

== Charities and activism ==
The first time Billy appeared on the Jerry Lewis MDA Labor Day Telethon was in September 2001. Two years later, in 2003, he began serving as the Muscular Dystrophy Association's National Youth chairman. He served six terms, from 2003 to 2008. As of 2017, he is still a celebrity ambassador for MDA and continues to perform on many of their charity drives.

In April 2012, Gilman collaborated with other country artists and released a charity single, "The Choice", for Soles4Souls, a shoe charity with proceeds going for purchase of shoes for needy children worldwide. In addition for Gilman as spokesman for the charity song and lead singer on it, 18 top country singers also took part in support. The track features vocals from Alan Jackson, Reba McEntire, Craig Morgan, Josh Turner, Kenny Rogers, LeAnn Rimes, Steve Holy, Kellie Pickler, Keith Urban, Wynonna Judd, Rodney Atkins, Amy Grant, Montgomery Gentry, Diamond Rio, Vince Gill, Richie McDonald, Ronnie Milsap and Randy Travis.

In 2026 he performed alongside Diana Rodrigues at the Ripples of Love Gala. https://m.youtube.com/watch?v=PmmB5u_EHOA&ra=m&fbclid=IwVERDUAUkC-dleHRuA2FlbQIxMQBwZG9mBWZkaWQWUPLmWT2q-6CF3tXHioKW0YrHnDRjIHNydGMGYXBwX2lkCjY2Mjg1NjgzNzkAAR4CjJN4eC2coETnpCLW3KiMa2RXYBjzaO-Y9EpGxoLihL-xaVa4CEex5_2kPQ_aem_93h5ZkBxgCQ6oaMBxoq27Q

== In popular culture ==
In 2000, Gilman appeared on the tribute album Country Goes Raffi, performing the Raffi song "Baby Beluga". In 2000, he also appeared on the television special Twas the Night Before Christmas singing seasonal songs.

On September 7 and 10, 2001, Gilman performed the song "Ben" (although he misspoke the first phrase of the song by changing "need look no more" to "we live no more") at Michael Jackson: 30th Anniversary Celebration in New York which was later televised. It was originally sung by Jackson himself in 1972.

Gilman was also on the album Dream A Dream by Welsh soprano Charlotte Church, singing the title track as a featured vocalist with her. The song is for voice and orchestra based on Fauré's Pavane Op. 50 ("Elysium").

In 2002, Gilman took part in a reading for the then Broadway-bound musical A Tale of Two Cities, in which he played "The Young Man", who is Madame DeFarge's brother.

In 2003, he appeared in the short documentary Our Country; and in 2005, he released the promotional documentary Billy Gilman: The Making of Everything and More, produced by Al Gomes of Big Noise, through Image Entertainment.

== Personal life ==
Gilman originated from Hope Valley, Rhode Island where he lived with his parents and his younger brother Colin as a young singer. He was also interviewed on Entertainment Tonight about his coming out on November 21, 2014, just one day after Ty Herndon had appeared on the same program.

In a video posted on November 20, 2014, Gilman came out as gay. He released his video titled "My Story by Billy Gilman" on One Voice Productions YouTube page only hours after another country singer Ty Herndon had come out. Gilman said in the video that Herndon's public acknowledgement inspired him to do the same. He married his husband, Anthony Carbone, in August 2024.

On March 16, 2017, he was honored in two separate ceremonies in the Rhode Island Senate and the House of Representatives for his successes and for representing Rhode Island as an artist.

== Discography ==
Studio albums

- One Voice (2000)
- Classic Christmas (2000)
- Dare to Dream (2001)
- Music Through Heartsongs (2003)
- Everything and More (2005)
- Billy Gilman (2006)

Compilation albums

- My Time on Earth (2006)

== Awards ==
=== Grammy Awards ===
The Grammy Awards are awarded annually by the National Academy of Recording Arts and Sciences. Gilman received one nomination.

Year	Nominee / work	Award	Result
2001	"One Voice"	Best Male Country Vocal Performance	Nominated

=== American Music Awards ===
Year	Nominee / work	Award	Result
2001	Billy Gilman	Favorite Country New Artist	Won

=== TNN and CMT Country Weekly Music Awards ===
Year	Nominee / work	Award	Result
2001	Billy Gilman	Fast Track Award	Nominated
2001	Billy Gilman	Discovery Award	Won

=== Academy of Country Music Awards ===
Year	Nominee / work	Award	Result
2001	Billy Gilman	Top New Male Vocalist	Nominated
2001	One Voice	Album of the Year	Nominated
2001	"One Voice"	Song of the Year	Nominated
