= Oklahoma (Billy Gilman song) =

2000 single by Billy Gilman

Single by Billy Gilman

from the album One Voice
- Released: October 9, 2000
- Recorded: 2000
- Genre: Country
- Length: 4:04
- Label: Epic Nashville
- Songwriters: John Allen; D. Vincent Williams
- Producers: Don Cook; David Malloy; Blake Chancey

Billy Gilman singles chronology
"One Voice" (2000)	"Oklahoma" (2000)	"There's a Hero" (2001)

Music video
- "Oklahoma" on YouTube

"Oklahoma" is a song written by D. Vincent Williams and John Allen, and recorded by American country music singer Billy Gilman. It was released in October 2000 as the second single from the album One Voice. The song reached number 33 on the Billboard Hot Country Singles & Tracks chart. and number 63 on the Billboard Hot 100. The album from the single is taken was certified two-times multi-platinum in the United States.

== Content ==
The song is about a boy reuniting with his birth father and his half-brother after somehow losing his mother and being put into foster care which he was shuffled around until his father was discovered.

== Chart performance ==
"Oklahoma" debuted at number 66 on Billboard's Hot Country Singles & Tracks chart for the chart week of October 14, 2000.

Chart (2000–2001)	Peak position
Canada Country Singles (RPM)	59 (Note: "Oklahoma" had not yet peaked when RPM ceased publication in November 2000.)
US Billboard Hot 100	63
US Hot Country Songs (Billboard)	33
