= Glenn Mercer =

American songwriter

Glenn Mercer is the vocalist and guitarist of the North Haledon, New Jersey–based rock band The Feelies. Together with Bill Million, Mercer has written and produced virtually all of the Feelies' recorded output.

== History ==
The Feelies' debut album, Crazy Rhythms, was voted in the top 50 albums of the 1980s by Rolling Stone magazine and chosen by Spin magazine as one of the best alternative albums. Other critical acclaim included a feature in Time magazine. The Feelies performed on Late Night with David Letterman and on Broadway and in concerts with Lou Reed, Patti Smith, R.E.M. and Bob Dylan.

Mercer's music has been featured in the films Married to the Mob, Something Wild (which featured a performance by the Feelies credited as "The Willies"), Prelude to a Kiss, The Truth about Charlie and The Squid and the Whale. Glenn's television credits include Dawson’s Creek, Party of Five and The Real World. He has also recorded with Feelies offshoots the Trypes, Yung Wu, the Willies and Wake Ooloo.

His first solo record, Wheels In Motion, was released by Pravda Records on June 5, 2007. Performers on the record include Feelies drummers and percussionists Stanley Demeski, Vinny DeNunzio, Dave Weckerman and Anton Fier, as well as Feelies and Trypes bassist Brenda Sauter. His second solo record, the all instrumental "Incidental Hum", was released in 2015 on Bar None Records.

Mercer's live band includes Gregston Van Pukeston (drums), Dave Weckerman (percussion), Adam Berardo (guitar), John Baumgartner (keyboards) and Bob Torsello of Shrubs (bass).

In July 2008, The Feelies reunited for a series of concerts at Battery Park (with Sonic Youth) and Maxwell's.

In 2011, The Feelies released their first record in 20 years entitled Here Before on the Bar None Records label. Mercer wrote or co-wrote all 13 new songs. In 2017, The Feelies released "In Between" on Bar None Records.

Starting in 2019, Mercer began performing a series of concerts entitled "Hazy Cosmic Jive", a tribute to the mid-1970s experimentation of David Bowie, Brian Eno, Roxy Music, Marc Bolan and others, with Richard Barone of The Bongos. Joining on drums and bass were Dave Weckerman and Bob Torsello.

Mercer currently resides in Haledon, New Jersey, with his wife. He has two children.

== Discography ==
"Wheels In Motion" (2007) Pravda Records

"Incidental Hum" (2015) Bar None Records
