= Matthew Sweet discography =

American musician discography

- Studio albums: 15
- Extended plays: 1
- Compilation albums: 2
- Singles: 6
- Collaborative albums: 3

This is the solo discography for American alternative rock/power pop musician Matthew Sweet.

== Albums ==
=== Studio ===
Title	Details	Peak chart positions				Certifications (sales thresholds)
Title	Details	US	AUS	NZ	UK	Certifications (sales thresholds)
Inside	Released: 1986; Label: Sony	—	—	—	—	
Earth	Released: 1989; Label: A&M	—	—	—	—	
Girlfriend	Released: October 22, 1991; Label: Zoo Entertainment	100	82	—	—	RIAA: Gold
Altered Beast	Released: July 13, 1993; Label: Zoo Entertainment	75	54	50	—	
100% Fun	Released: March 14, 1995; Label: Zoo Entertainment	65	75	—	114	MC: Gold; RIAA: Gold
Blue Sky on Mars	Released: March 25, 1997; Label: Zoo Entertainment	66	—	—	—	
In Reverse	Released: October 12, 1999; Label: Volcano	188	—	—	—	
Kimi Ga Suki	Released: April 22, 2003; Label: RCAM	—	—	—	—	
Living Things	Released: September 7, 2004; Label: RCAM	—	—	—	—	
Under the Covers, Vol. 1	With Susanna Hoffs; Released: April 18, 2006; Label: Shout! Factory	192	—	—	—	
Sunshine Lies	Released: August 26, 2008; Label: Shout! Factory	162	—	—	—	
Under the Covers, Vol. 2	With Susanna Hoffs; Released: July 21, 2009; Label: Shout! Factory	106	—	—	—	
Modern Art	Released: September 27, 2011; Label: Missing Piece	—	—	—	—	
Under the Covers, Vol. 3	With Susanna Hoffs; Released: November 12, 2013; Label: Shout! Factory	—	—	—	—	
Tomorrow Forever	Released: June 16, 2017; Label: Honeycomb Hideout	—	—	—	—	
Tomorrow's Daughter	Released: May 18, 2018; Label: MRI	—	—	—	—	
Wicked System of Things	Released: November 23, 2018; Label: Honeycomb Hideout	—	—	—	—	
Catspaw	Released: 2021; Label: Omnivore Recordings	—	—	—	—	
"—" denotes a release that did not chart.

=== Compilation ===
Title	Details	Peak positions
Title	Details	UK
Time Capsule: The Best of Matthew Sweet 90/00	Released: September 26, 2000; Label: Volcano	—
To Understand: The Early Recordings of Matthew Sweet	Released: October 1, 2002; Label: Hip-O	—
Completely Under the Covers	With Susanna Hoffs; Released: October 2015; Label: Demon	72
"—" denotes a release that did not chart.

== Extended plays ==
Title	Details
Son of Altered Beast	Released: March 15, 1994; Label: Zoo Entertainment
The Pillowcase	With Susanna Hoffs; Released: August 22, 2006; Label: Shout! Factory

== Singles ==
Year	Single	Peak chart positions				Album
Year	Single	US	US Main	US Mod	AUS	Album
1986	"Save Time for Me"	—	—	—	—	Inside
1987	"Blue Fools"	—	—	—	—	Inside
1991	"Divine Intervention"	—	—	23	—	Girlfriend
1992	"Girlfriend"	—	10	4	71	Girlfriend
1992	"I've Been Waiting"	—	—	—	—	Girlfriend
1993	"The Ugly Truth"	—	35	3	—	Altered Beast
1993	"Time Capsule"	—	—	—	118	Altered Beast
1995	"We're the Same"	— (Note: "We're the Same" did not enter the Billboard Hot 100, but peaked at number 13 on the Bubbling Under Hot 100 Singles chart.)	—	34	—	100% Fun
1995	"Sick of Myself"	58	13	2	90	100% Fun
1997	"Where You Get Love"	—	24	14	178	Blue Sky On Mars
"—" denotes a release that did not chart or was not issued in that region.

== Contributions ==
- In 1985, Sweet contributed a cover of the dB's "Ask for Jill" (with Don Dixon and Chris Stamey) for the Hoboken anthology, Luxury Condos Coming to Your Neighborhood Soon.
- In 1991, Sweet contributed bass guitar to a cover of Leonard Cohen's "Chelsea Hotel" (recorded by Lloyd Cole) for the tribute album I'm Your Fan: The Songs of Leonard Cohen, as well as contributing to other Cole albums throughout the 1990s.
- In 1992, Sweet contributed the song "Silent City" for the film Buffy the Vampire Slayer.
- In 1993, Sweet contributed the song "Superdeformed" for the benefit album No Alternative (the music video for this song was featured on an episode of the show Beavis and Butthead). Also that year, Sweet contributed a cover of Victoria Williams's song "This Moment" for another benefit, Sweet Relief: A Benefit for Victoria Williams.
- In 1994, Sweet contributed a cover of The Carpenter's "Let Me Be The One" for the tribute album If I Were A Carpenter.
- In 1995, Sweet contributed a cover of "Scooby-Doo, Where Are You?" for the tribute album Saturday Morning: Cartoons' Greatest Hits. Also that year, Sweet contributed the song "Everything Changes" for the film The Baby-Sitters Club, the song "Ultrasuede" for the film National Lampoon's Senior Trip and the song "My Pet" for the film Ace Ventura: When Nature Calls.
- In 1996, Sweet contributed the song "Happiness" for the film Kids in the Hall: Brain Candy, the song "Dark Secret" for the film The Craft, and the song "Swan Song" for the film Bed of Roses. Also that year, Sweet contributed bass guitar to the Fastball song "Are You Ready for the Fallout?" on their debut album.
- In 1997, Sweet contributed the song "Hollow" for the film The Game. Also that year, Sweet contributed the song "BBC" (with Mike Myers) for the film Austin Powers: International Man of Mystery, as well as appearing in the film itself.
- In 1998, Sweet contributed the song "Farther Down" for the film Can't Hardly Wait. Also that year, Sweet contributed a cover of Walter Egan's "Magnet & Steel" for the show Sabrina the Teenage Witch, and this cover was also featured in the film Overnight Delivery.
- In 1999, Sweet contributed the song "Faith in You" for the film Drive Me Crazy
- In 2000, Sweet contributed vocals and lyrics to Delerium's song "Daylight" on one of the band's albums.
- In 2002, Sweet contributed his song "Girlfriend" for the film Crossroads, He also contributed the song "Daddy Wasn't There" (with Mike Myers) for the film Austin Powers in Goldmember, as well as appearing in the film itself.
- In 2003, Sweet contributed the song "It Don't Matter to Me" for the film Ash Wednesday.
- In 2004, Sweet contributed the song "Cats Vs. Dogs" for the film Garfield: The Movie.
- In 2005, Sweet contributed a cover of Tom Petty's "American Girl" for High School Reunion: A Tribute To Those Great 1980's Films.
- In 2006, Sweet contributed the song "The Tide Is High" for the film How to Eat Fried Worms.
- In 2007, Sweet contributed the song "Come to California" for the film Nancy Drew, a cover of the Stone Poneys' "Different Drum" for the film The Heartbreak Kid, and the song Wild for the film The Bigtop.
- In 2009, Sweet contributed a cover of The Beatles' "Got to Get You into My Life" for the film Imagine That.
