= The Specs =

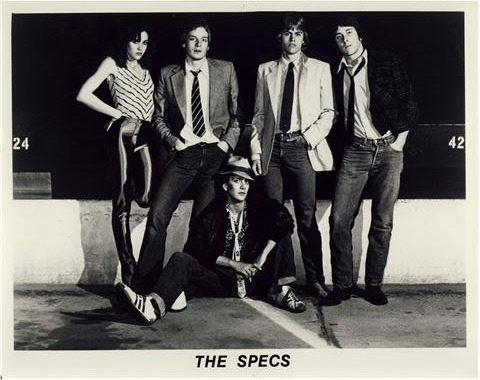
- Clockwise from left: band members Sara Kovanda, Rick Morris, Matthew Sweet, Don Holmquist, David Snider

Background information
- Origin: Lincoln, Nebraska, US
- Genres: Pop; new wave; cover band
- Years active: 1978–1980

The Specs was a new wave cover band from Lincoln, Nebraska that played together from 1978–1980. The groups is now best-known as featuring musician Matthew Sweet, before he went on to greater success as a solo performer.

== History ==
Sweet grew up in Lincoln in a musical family, and as a child he learned to play multiple instruments; by his early teens he was already a very proficient bass player, having practiced the complicated bass lines of Yes records for hours every day. While in junior high school, he met some of the Specs' other band members, who were all college students, at a music store (Correction: he did not meet the other members at a music store but was invited to a band practice by David Snider, who was an acquaintance). The band had previously been called Spectrum and had been covering Top 40 songs. As the Specs, they started performing more new wave and 1960s music (Correction: these were songs The Specs were covering as Spectrum, prior to Mr. Sweet being invited to join the band), by bands such as the Jam, the Vibrators, the Yardbirds and the Who.

"Look Out Girl"
22-second sample

Although they were a cover band, in 1980 they did release one original song, called "Look Out Girl (You Need a Direction)", on the compilation The KFMQ Homegrown Album Though a popular local song and the most requested song on the compilation, many of the lyrics were criticized as being plagiarized from The Jam's album, "This Is The Modern World".

== Members ==
The band's members were as follows:

- Rick Morris – guitar
- Sara Kovanda – vocals, keyboards
- Matthew Sweet – bass guitar
- Don Holmquist – drums
- Jeff Runnings – keyboards (final line-up)
- John Link – bass guitar
- Dave Snider

== After the Specs ==
The Specs broke up in 1980. Rick Morris and Sara Kovanda went on to join the Click. Jeff Runnings became a member of Hymn to Joy; since 1984 he has been in For Against. In 1983, Sweet left Lincoln to be part of the Athens, Georgia music scene and became a member of Oh-OK, Community Trolls and the Buzz of Delight, before going on to have a successful solo career.
