= The Complete Recordings (Oh-OK album) =

Compilation album by Oh-OK
- Released: June 24, 2002
- Recorded: 1982 – April 6, 1984
- Genre: Rock, pop
- Length: 48:13
- Language: English
- Label: Collector's Choice
- Producer: Michael Stipe

Professional ratings
Review scores
Source	Rating
Allmusic	4.5/5 stars
Robert Christgau	A−

The Complete Recordings is a compilation album for Oh-OK released by Collector's Choice Music on June 24, 2002. The compilation includes all of the band's previous releases as well as a live set from 1984—shortly before the group broke up.

== Track listing ==
Wow Mini Album

1. "Lilting" (Lynda Stipe) – 1:03
2. "Brother" (Carol Levy) – 1:28
3. "Playtime" (Stipe) – 2:02
4. "Person" (Stipe) – 2:32

Furthermore What

5. "Such N Such" (Stipe) – 2:05
6. "Guru" (Stipe) – 3:03
7. "Choukoutien" (Stipe) – 2:54
8. "Straight" (Linda Hopper) – 2:24
9. "Giddy Up" (Hopper) – 1:52
10. "Elaine's Song" (Stipe) – 3:14

Live tracks

11. "Random" (Stipe) – 1:25
12. "Is It?" (Stipe) – 2:12
13. "Whore Boy" (Ingrid Schorr) – 1:46
14. "Round Is Funny" (Stipe) – 1:19
15. "Let's Get Together" (Richard M. Sherman and Robert B. Sherman) – 1:46
16. "Here We Go" (Stipe) – 1:47
17. "Sunday Morning" (Hopper-Stipe) – 2:22
18. "Down by the Beach" (Stipe) – 2:05
19. "Shock (Sic Transit)" (Stipe) – 2:46
20. "Lilting" (Stipe) – 2:04
21. "Jumping" (Oh-OK, Stipe) – 1:35
22. "Courage Courage" (Stipe) – 2:50
23. "Psycho Killer" (David Byrne, Chris Frantz, and Tina Weymouth) – 1:52

== Personnel ==
Wow Mini Album

- Linda Hopper – vocals, noises
- David Pierce – drums
- Lynda Stipe – bass guitar, vocals

Furthermore What

- Linda Hopper – vocals
- David McNair – drums
- Lynda Stipe – bass guitar, vocals
- Matthew Sweet – guitar

"Random"

Recorded for the various artists compilation Squares Blot Out the Sun in November 1982 at 688 in Atlanta, Georgia

- Linda Hopper – vocals
- David Pierce – drums
- Lynda Stipe – bass guitar, vocals

Remaining live set

Recorded April 6, 1984 in Atlanta

- Linda Hopper – vocals
- David McNair – drums
- Lynda Stipe – bass guitar, vocals
- Matthew Sweet – guitar

Other personnel

- Robert Christgau and Carola Dibbell – liner notes
