= The Pillowcase =

EP by Matthew Sweet and Susanna Hoffs
- Released: August 22, 2006
- Recorded: Lolina Green (Matthew Sweet's home studio)
- Genre: Rock
- Label: Shout! Factory / Parasol Records
- Producers: Matthew Sweet, Susanna Hoffs

Matthew Sweet chronology
Under the Covers, Vol. 1 (2006)	The Pillowcase (2006)	Sunshine Lies (2008)

Susanna Hoffs chronology
Under the Covers, Vol. 1 (2006)	The Pillowcase (2006)	Under the Covers, Vol. 2 (2009)

The Pillowcase is a collaboration EP between alternative rock artist Matthew Sweet and Bangles singer Susanna Hoffs. Released by Shout! Factory in 2006 in collaboration with Parasol Records as a double-7" vinyl, it contains 4 cover versions of favorite songs from the 1960s. It was designed as a companion piece to Sweet and Hoffs' album, Under the Covers, Vol. 1. Two of the tracks on the EP appear on that album, while the other two tracks were originally exclusive to the EP, but were later released in the compilation box set Completely Under the Covers.

== Track listing ==
#	Title	Original artist
1.	"I See the Rain"	The Marmalade
2.	"The Village Green Preservation Society"*	The Kinks
3.	"She May Call You Up Tonight"	The Left Banke
4.	"I Can See for Miles"*	The Who

* tracks initially exclusive to this EP

== Personnel ==
- Matthew Sweet - vocals, guitar, organ, piano
- Susanna Hoffs - vocals
- Ivan Julian - acoustic guitar, "feedback"
- Richard Lloyd - guitar
- Van Dyke Parks - piano
- Ric Menck - drums, tambourine
- Julie Pusch - violin, viola
- Joseph Harvey - cello
- Shawn Amos - executive producer
- Bob Ludwig - mastering
- Henry Diltz - photography
- Ed Fotheringham - illustrations
- Jeff Palo - artwork, package supervision
- Todd Gallopo - package design
- Julee Stover - editorial supervision
- Emily Johnson - project assistant
- John Roberts - project assistant
