= The Bridges (band) =

American folk rock band

- Origin: Oxford, Alabama, U.S.
- Genres: Folk rock Power pop
- Years active: 2005–present
- Label: Verve Forecast Records
- Members: Brittany Painter; Stacey Byrd; Natalie Byrd; Issaca Byrd; Jeremy Byrd

The Bridges is an American folk rock band that formed in Oxford, Alabama in 2005 consisting of cousins and siblings Brittany Painter (lead vocals/acoustic guitar), Natalie Byrd (keyboard/ rhythm guitar), Stacey Byrd (lead guitar), Issaca Byrd (bass guitar), and Jeremy Byrd (drums). The group released their debut studio album Limits of the Sky on June 10, 2008.

== History ==
The seeds for the band began to take root in 2002, when Brittany Painter moved to Oxford from Rocky Mount, North Carolina, during her senior year of high school to live with the Byrds and eventually began an acoustic band with her cousins Stacey and Natalie as Long Story Short playing in coffeehouses and church functions, until 2005 when Jeremy and Issaca Byrd joined and changed their sound and direction. They then decided to pool their Crosby, Stills and Nash, the Beatles, Ryan Adams, and Fleetwood Mac influences and well as the Byrds' gospel background into their music and promptly changed their name to The Bridges. Tours with Rooney, the Bangles, and Matthew Sweet brought them to the Verve Forecast label, who released their debut album Limits of the Sky.

The Bridges released an independent EP in December 2010 entitled "Our Monster." Recorded in Nashville, TN (where they moved in 2009) with Ian Fitchuk and Justin Loucks. They also released a 2012 EP entitled "The Bridges Do Christmas" on bandcamp.

== Discography ==
Year	Album
2008	Limits of the Sky
