= Greg Leisz =

American musician

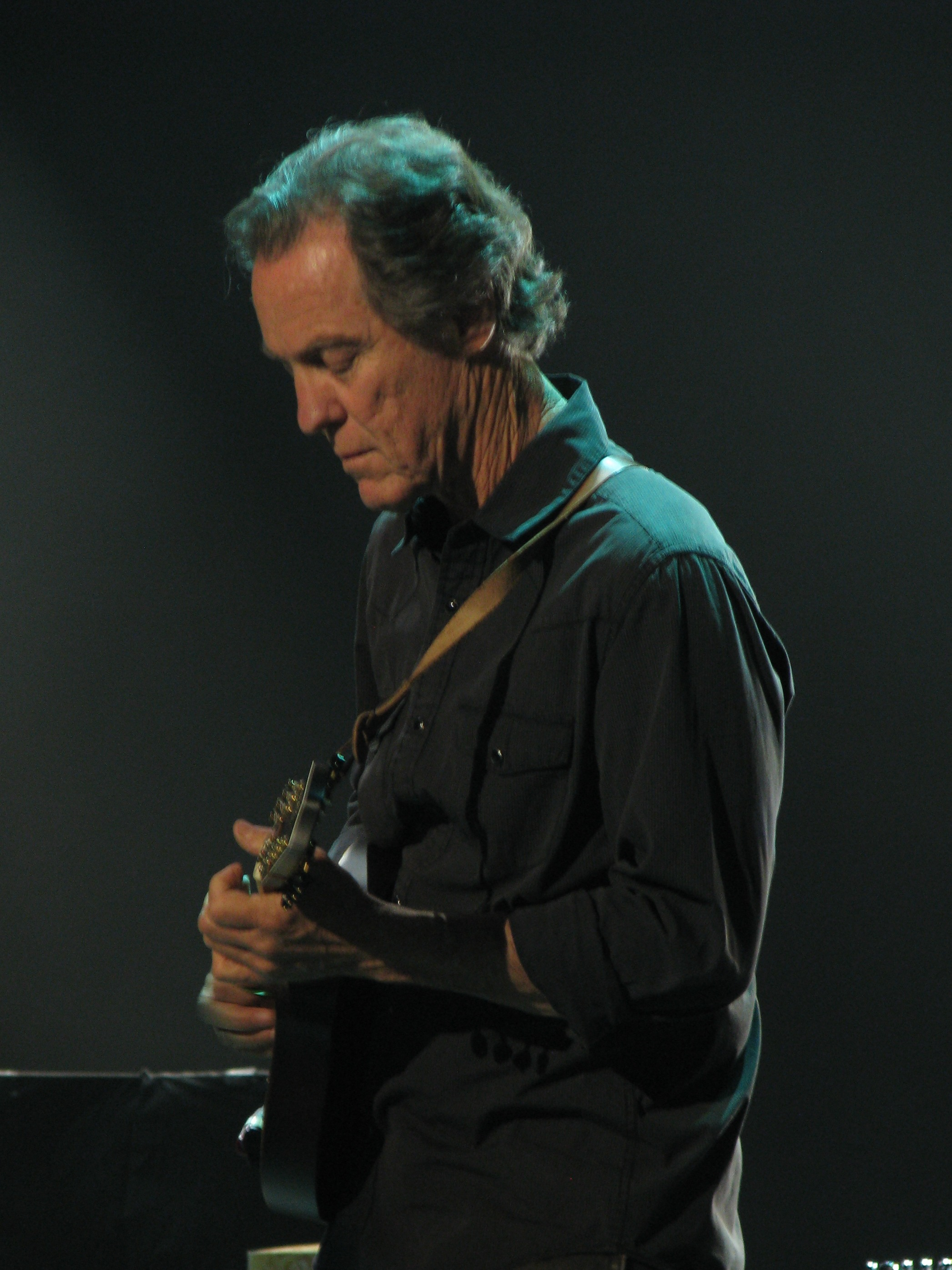
- Leisz playing mandolin in Eric Clapton's band in 2013

Background information
- Born: Gregory Brian Leisz; September 18, 1949 (age 77); Buffalo, New York, U.S.
- Genres: Rock, folk, country, pop, jazz, blues, acoustic
- Occupations: Musician, songwriter, record producer
- Instruments: Lap steel, pedal steel guitar, guitar, dobro, mandolin, banjo
- Years active: Mid-1960s–present
- Member of: The Forest Rangers

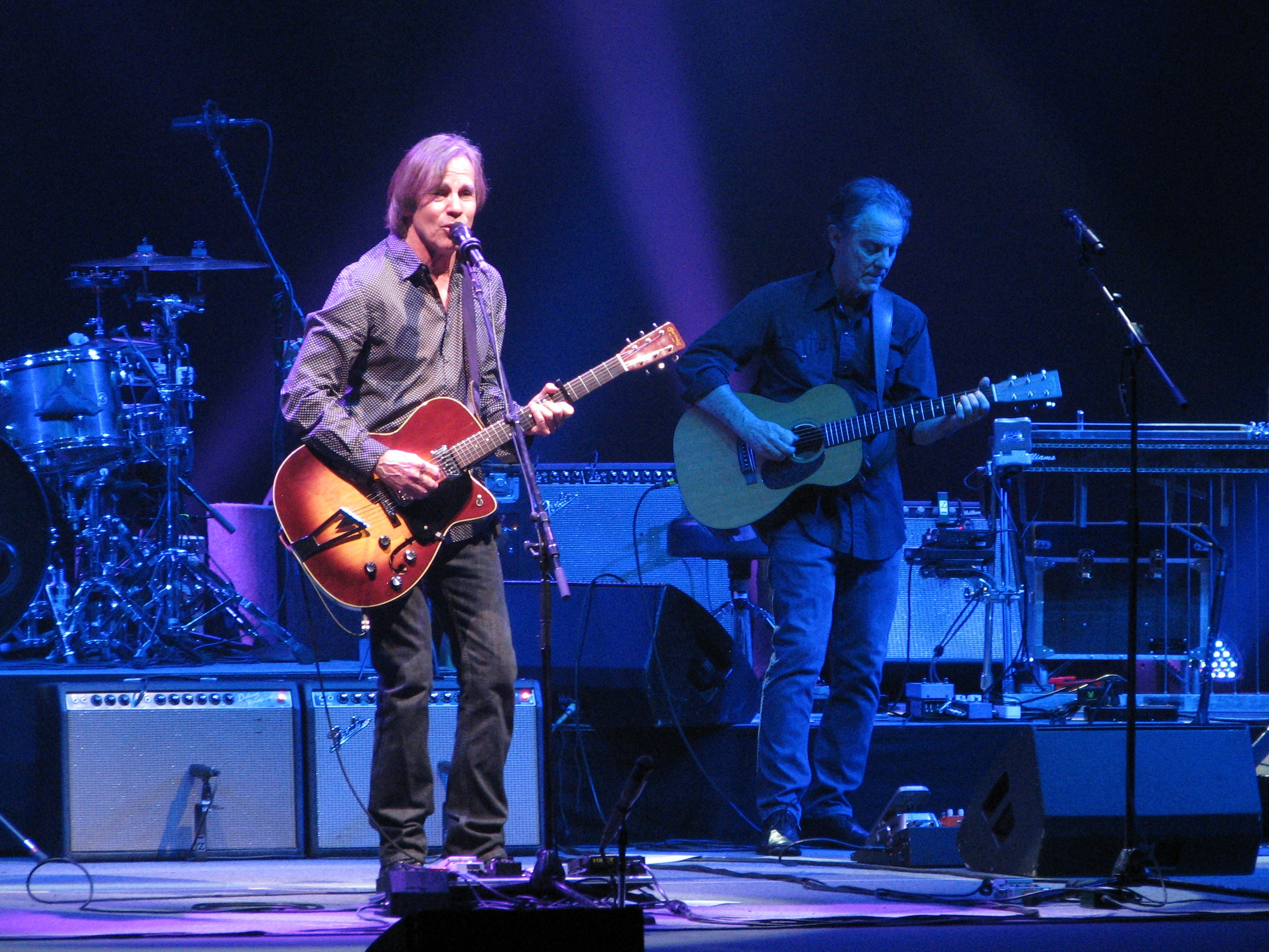
Leisz playing guitar with Jackson Browne (left) in Greenville, South Carolina, 2015

Gregory Brian Leisz (/liːs/ LEESS; born September 18, 1949) is an American musician. He is a songwriter, recording artist, and producer. He plays guitar, dobro, mandolin, banjo, lap steel and pedal steel guitar.

== Biography ==
Leisz was born in Buffalo, New York, on September 18, 1949. He grew up in the garage band culture of mid-1960s Southern California. He spent time at the Ash Grove, The Troubador, and clubs on the Sunset Strip. He began playing guitar and soon added dobro and lap steel, inspired to pick up the pedal steel after hearing Sneaky Pete Kleinow and Buddy Emmons. In 1975, he toured with John Stewart (formerly of The Kingston Trio). He was a member of Funky Kings who released their eponymous debut album on Arista Records in 1976.

In 1987, Leisz began working with Dave Alvin (formerly of The Blasters). Their collaboration led to Leisz producing several of Alvin's albums, including King of California, Black Jack David, Ashgrove, and West of the West. In 1989, he played on k.d. lang's Grammy-winning Absolute Torch and Twang and joined her on the resulting tour. For the next eighteen years he toured with Lang and recorded with her, including her album Ingenue. Starting the early 1990s, he worked often with Matthew Sweet, played on Sweet's album Girlfriend and toured with him.

In January 2008, Leisz joined the group Works Progress Administration, a band composed of Leisz, Sean Watkins (guitar), his sister Sara Watkins (fiddle), Glen Phillips (guitar, vocals), Benmont Tench (piano), Luke Bulla (fiddle), Pete Thomas (drums), and Davey Faragher (bass). The group released their debut album, WPA, on September 15, 2009.

In 2010 and 2011, Leisz toured with Ray LaMontagne as a member of his backing band, The Pariah Dogs. He toured in 2013 as a member of Eric Clapton's band, in 2015 as a member of Jackson Browne's band, and again in 2017. He appeared in the 2016 Cameron Crowe cable television series Roadies, accompanying Jackson Browne on three songs in the last episode of the series.

Leisz played mandolin on the mid-2021 Bob Dylan recordings of "Blowin' in the Wind," "Masters of War," "The Times They Are A-Changin' (song)," "Simple Twist of Fate," "Gotta Serve Somebody," and "Not Dark Yet" produced by T-Bone Burnett and recorded and mixed by Michael Piersante for a one-time sale as Ionic Originals.

Greg married Estonian musician Mai Leisz in April 2018.

== Awards ==
In 2010, Leisz was presented with a Lifetime Achievement Award for Instrumentalist by the Americana Music Association.

In 2011 he received a Grammy Award for Best Contemporary Folk Album for his contributions to Ray LaMontagne's album God Willin' & the Creek Don't Rise (2010).

== Discography ==
=== As sideman ===
With Ryan Adams

- Demolition (Lost Highway, 2002)
- Love Is Hell (Lost Highway, 2004)
- Ashes & Fire (Capitol, 2011)

With Amy Allison

- Sad Girl (Diesel Only, 2001)
- Sheffield Streets (Urban Myth, 2009)

With The Bangles

- Doll Revolution (E1 Music, 2003)
- Sweetheart of the Sun (Model Music Group, 2011)

With Beck

- Odelay (DGC, 1996)
- Mutations (DGC, 1999)
- Midnite Vultures (DGC, 1998)
- Morning Phase (Capitol, 2014)

With Jackson Browne

- The Naked Ride Home (Elektra, 2002)
- Standing in the Breach (Inside Recordings, 2014)
- Downhill from Everywhere (Inside Recordings, 2021)

With Peter Case

- Torn Again (Vanguard, 1995)
- Full Service No Waiting (Vanguard, 1998)
- Flying Saucer Blues (Vanguard, 2000)
- Who's Gonna Go Your Crooked Mile? (Vanguard, 2004)

With Eric Clapton

- Clapton (Reprise, 2010)
- Old Sock (Surfdog, 2013)

With Joe Cocker

- Organic (550 Music, 1996)
- Hymn for My Soul (EMI, 2007)

With Holly Cole

- Dark Dear Heart (Alert, 1997)
- Night (Universal Music, 2012)

With Paula Cole

- This Fire (Imago, 1996)
- Amen (Imago, 1999)
- Courage (Decca, 2007)

With A. J. Croce

- Adrian James Croce (Seedling, 2004)
- Cage of Muses (Seidling, 2009)

With David Crosby

- Sky Trails (BMG, 2017)
- For Free (BMG, 2021)

With Marshall Crenshaw

- Life's Too Short (MCA Records, 1991)
- Miracle of Science (Razor & Tie, 1996)
- 447 (Razor & Tie, 1999)
- What's In The Bag? (Razor & Tie, 2003)
- Jaggedland (429 Records, 2009)

With Shawn Colvin

- Fat City (Columbia, 1992)
- These Four Walls (Nonesuch, 2006)

With Sheryl Crow

- The Globe Sessions (A&M, 1998)
- Wildflower (A&M, 2005)

With Grey DeLisle

- Homewrecker (Humminbird, 2002)
- The Graceful Ghost (Sugar Hill, 2004)
- Iron Flowers (Sugar Hill, 2005)

With Don Felder

- Road to Forever (Top Ten, 2012)
- American Rock 'n' Roll (BMG, 2019)

With John Fogerty

- The Blue Ridge Rangers Rides Again (Fortunate Son, 2009)
- Wrote a Song for Everyone (Vanguard Records, 2013)

With Bill Frisell

- Good Dog, Happy Man (Nonesuch, 1999)
- Blues Dream (Nonesuch, 2001)
- The Intercontinentals (Nonesuch, 2003)
- Disfarmer (Nonesuch, 2009)
- All We Are Saying (Savoy Jazz, 2011)
- Guitar in the Space Age! (OKeh, 2014)

With Amy Grant

- Behind the Eyes (A&M, 1997)
- Somewhere Down the Road (Sparrow, 2010)

With Haim

- Days Are Gone (Polydor, 2013)
- Something to Tell You (Columbia, 2017)

With John Wesley Harding

- Why We Fight (Sire, 1992)
- John Wesley Harding's New Deal (Forward, 1996)

With Natalie Hemby

- Puxico (GetWrucke, 2017)
- Pins and Needles (Fantasy, 2021)

With Joe Henry

- Civilians (ANTI, 2007)
- Invisible Hour (ANTI, 2014)

With Missy Higgins

- The Sound of White (Eleven, 2004)
- On a Clear Night (Eleven, 2007)

With Mark Knopfler

- One Deep River (EMI, 2024)

With Miranda Lambert

- Revolution (Columbia Records, 2009)
- Four the Record (RCA Records, 2011)
- Platinum (RCA Records, 2014)

With k.d. lang

- Shadowland (Sire Records, 1988)
- Absolute Torch and Twang (Warner Bros. Records, 1989)
- Ingénue (Warner Bros. Records, 1992)
- Drag (Warner Bros. Records, 1997)
- Invincible Summer (Warner Bros. Records, 2000)
- Watershed (Nonesuch Records, 2008)

With Amos Lee

- Supply and Demand (Blue Note Records, 2006)
- Last Days at the Lodge (Blue Note Records, 2008)
- Mission Bell (Blue Note Records, 2011)
- As the Crow Flies (Blue Note Records, 2012)
- My New Moon (Dualtone Records, 2018)
- Transmissions (Hoagiemouth Records, 2024)

With Charles Lloyd

- I Long to See You (Blue Note, 2016)
- Vanished Gardens (Blue Note, 2018) featuring Lucinda Williams

With Jim Lauderdale

- Pretty Close to the Truth (Atlantic Records, 1994)
- Every Second Counts (Atlantic Records, 1995)

With John Mayer

- Heavier Things (Aware Records, 2003)
- Born and Raised (Columbia Records, 2012)
- The Search for Everything (Columbia Records, 2017)
- Sob Rock (Columbia Records, 2021)

With Shannon McNally

- Jukebox Sparrows (Capitol Records, 2002)
- Geronimo (Black Porch Records, 2005)

With Joni Mitchell

- Turbulent Indigo (Reprise, 1994)
- Taming the Tiger (Reprise, 1998)
- Shine (Hear Music, 2007)

With Keb' Mo'

- The Door (Epic, 2000)
- Big Wide Grin (Sony, 2001)
- Suitcase (Epic, 2006)

With The Murmurs

- Pristine Smut (MCA Records, 1997)
- Blender (MCA Records, 1998)

With Willie Nelson

- The Great Divide (Lost Highway, 2002)
- Heroes (Legacy, 2012)

With Aaron Neville

- I Know I've Been Changed (EMI, 2010)
- My True Story (Blue Note, 2012)

With Randy Newman

- Bad Love (DreamWorks Pictures, 1999)
- Harps and Angels (Nonesuch Records, 2008)

With Mark Olson

- My Own Jo Ellen (HighTone Records, 2000)
- The Salvation Blues (Hacktone, 2007)

With Judith Owen

- Lost And Found (Century of Progress, 2005)
- Somebody's Child (Twanky, 2016)

With Sam Phillips

- Omnipop (It's Only a Flesh Wound Lambchop) (Virgin, 1996)
- Cameras in the Sky (Littlebox Recordings, 2011)

With Chuck Prophet

- Balinese Dancer (China, 1993)
- Homemade Blood (Cooking Vinyl, 1997)
- No Other Love (New West, 2002)
- ¡Let Freedom Ring! (Yep, 2009)

With Bonnie Raitt

- Slipstream (Redwing, 2012)
- Dig In Deep (Redwing, 2016)

With Carrie Rodriguez

- Seven Angels on a Bicycle (Back Porch, 2006)
- Love and Circumstance (Ninth Street Opus, 2010)

With Vonda Shepard

- It's Good Eve (Vesperalley, 1996)
- By 7:30 (Jacket, 1999)
- From the Sun (Redeye, 2008)

With Bruce Springsteen

- Wrecking Ball (Columbia, 2012)
- Western Stars (Columbia, 2019)

With Barbra Streisand

- The Secret of Life: Partners, Volume Two (Columbia Records, 2025)

With Matthew Sweet

- Girlfriend (Zoo, 1991)
- 100% Fun (Zoo, 1995)
- In Reverse (Volcano, 1999)
- Kimi Ga Suki (RCAM, 2003)
- Living Things (RCAM, 2004)
- Sunshine Lies (Shout! Factory, 2008)

With Matthew Sweet and Susanna Hoffs

- Under the Covers, Vol. 1 (Shout! Factory, 2006)
- Under the Covers, Vol. 2 (Shout! Factory, 2009)

With SYML

- Nobody Lives Here (FIN., 2025)

With Teddy Thompson

- Teddy Thompson (Virgin, 2000)
- Upfront & Down Low (Verve Forecast, 2007)

With Tiger Army

- Tiger Army (Hellcat, 1999)
- V •••– (Rise, 2016)

With St. Vincent

- Masseduction (Loma Vista, 2017)
- Daddy's Home (Loma Vista, 2021)

With Loudon Wainwright III

- Here Come the Choppers (Sovereign, 2005)
- Recovery (Yep Roc, 2008)

With Rufus Wainwright

- Unfollow the Rules (BMG, 2020)
- Folkocracy (BMG, 2023)

With Gillian Welch

- Revival (Almo Sounds, 1996)
- Soul Journey (Acony, 2003)

With Jennifer Warnes

- The Well (Virgin, 2001)
- Another Time, Another Place (BMG, 2018)

With Lucinda Williams

- Car Wheels on a Gravel Road (Mercury, 1998)
- Down Where the Spirit Meets the Bone (Highway 20, 2014)
- The Ghosts of Highway 20 (Highway 20, 2016)

With Robbie Williams

- Escapology (Chrysalis, 2002)
- Intensive Care (Chrysalis, 2005)

With Victoria Williams

- Loose (Atlantic, 1994)
- Musings of a Creek Dipper (Atlantic, 1998)
- Water to Drink (Atlantic, 2000)

With Brian Wilson

- Imagination (Giant, 1998)
- Gettin' In Over My Head (Brimel, 2004)

With Wolf Bros

- Live in Colorado (Third Man, 2022)
- Live in Colorado Vol. 2 (Third Man, 2022)

=== With others ===
- Gregg Allman, Southern Blood (Rounder, 2017)
- Athenaeum, Radiance (Atlantic, 1998)
- David Baerwald, Bedtime Stories (A&M, 1990)
- Jessie Baylin, Little Spark (Blonde Rat, 2012)
- Karla Bonoff, Silent Night (Not On Label, 2020)
- Mose Allison, The Way of the World (Anti-, 2010)
- Dave Alvin, Out in California (HighTone, 2002)
- Anjani, Blue Alert (Columbia, 2006)
- Fiona Apple, Tidal (Clean Slate, 1996)
- Jann Arden, Happy (A&M Records, 1997)
- Steve Azar, Heartbreak Town (River North, 1996)
- Bad Religion, Recipe for Hate (Epitaph, 1993)
- Joan Baez, Whistle Down the Wind (Proper Records, 2018)
- Bash & Pop, Friday Night Is Killing Me (Sire, 1993)
- The Beach Boys, Stars and Stripes Vol. 1 (River North, 1996)
- Bonnie "Prince" Billy, Beware (Drag City, 2009)
- Mary Black, Shine (Dara, 1997)
- Bon Jovi, Lost Highway (Island Records, 2007)
- Chris Botti, Slowing Down the World (GRP, 1999)
- Michelle Branch, Everything Comes and Goes (Reprise Records, 2010)
- Phoebe Bridgers, Stranger in the Alps (Dead Oceans, 2017)
- Jon Brion, Meaningless (Straight to Cut Out, 2001)
- Jonatha Brooke, The Works (Bad Dog, 2008)
- T Bone Burnett, Tooth of Crime (Nonesuch Records, 2008)
- Brandi Carlile, In the Canyon Haze (Elektra Records, 2022)
- Carlene Carter, Carter Girl (Rounder, 2014)
- Neal Casal, The Sun Rises Here (Glitterhouse, 1998)
- Tracy Chapman, Let It Rain (Elektra Records, 2002)
- Bruce Cockburn, Dart to the Heart (True North, 1994)
- Adam Cohen, Adam Cohen (Columbia Records, 1998)
- Christina Courtin, "Christina Courtin" (Nonesuch, 2009)
- Crowded House, Intriguer (Fantasy, 2010)
- Rodney Crowell, Sex & Gasoline (Work Song, 2008)
- Velvet Crush, Teenage Symphonies to God (Sony, 1994)
- Ilse DeLange, The Great Escape (Universal Music, 2006)
- Brett Dennen, So Much More (Dualtone, 2006)
- Neil Diamond, Melody Road (Capitol Records, 2014)
- Bob Dylan, Shadow Kingdom (Columbia Records, 2023)
- Jakob Dylan, Women + Country (Columbia, 2010)
- Eagles, Long Road Out of Eden (Lost Highway, 2007)
- Tim Easton, Break Your Mother's Heart (New West Records, 2003)
- Kat Edmonson, The Big Picture (Sony, 2014)
- Ramblin' Jack Elliott, A Stranger Here (ANTI, 2009)
- Melissa Etheridge, Breakdown (Island Records, 1999)
- Brandon Flowers, The Desired Effect (Island Records, 2015)
- Julia Fordham, Falling Forward (Virgin Records, 1994)
- Glenn Frey, After Hours (Universal Music, 2012)
- Lisa Germano, Magic Neighbor (Young God, 2009)
- Barry Gibb, In the Now (Columbia Records, 2016)
- Grant Lee Buffalo, Mighty Joe Moon (Slash, 1994)
- Gratitude, Gratitude (Atlantic Records, 2005)
- Michael Grimm, Michael Grimm (Epic Records, 2011)
- Indigo Girls, Despite Our Differences (Hollywood, 2006)
- Ben Harper, Diamonds On the Inside (Virgin, 2003)
- Emmylou Harris and Linda Ronstadt, Western Wall: The Tucson Sessions (Asylum, 1999)
- Emmylou Harris, All I Intended to Be (Nonesuch, 2008)
- Mark Heard, Second Hand (Fingerprint, 1991)
- Beth Hart, Leave the Light On (Warner Bros., 2003)
- Ted Hawkins, The Next Hundred Years (Geffen, 1994)
- Highway 101, Paint the Town (Warner Bros., 1989)
- Taylor Hicks, Taylor Hicks (Arista, 2006)
- Susanna Hoffs, Susanna Hoffs (London, 1996)
- Steve Holy, Brand New Girlfriend (Curb, 2006)
- Court Yard Hounds, Court Yard Hounds (Columbia, 2010)
- Jesca Hoop, Memories Are Now (Sub Pop, 2016)
- Niall Horan, Flicker (Capitol Records, 2017)
- James Iha, Let It Come Down (Virgin, 1998)
- Bon Iver, Bon Iver, Bon Iver (Jagjauwar, 2011)
- Jayhawks, Tomorrow the Green Grass (American, 1995)
- Courtney Jaye, Love and Forgiveness (Not On Label, 2013)
- Jorma Kaukonen, Stars in My Crown (Red House, 2007)
- Funky Kings, Funky Kings (Arista Records, 1976)
- Dave Koz, Off the Beaten Path (Capitol, 1996)
- Alison Krauss, Windy City (Capitol, 2017)
- Ray LaMontagne, God Willin' & the Creek Don't Rise (RCA Records, 2010)
- Hugh Laurie, Didn't It Rain (Warner Bros. Records, 2013)
- Hamilton Leithauser + Rostam, I Had a Dream That You Were Mine (Glassnote Records, 2016)
- Jenny Lewis, Joy'All (Blue Note, 2023)
- Lori Lieberman, Monterey (Drive On, 2003)
- Lifehouse, Almería (Geffen, 2012)
- The Manhattan Transfer, The Spirit of St. Louis (Atlantic, 2000)
- Dayna Manning, Shades (EMI Canada, 2002)
- Ricky Martin, A Medio Vivir (Columbia, 1995)
- Brian McKnight, Back at One (Motown, 1999)
- Christy McWilson, The Lucky One (HighTone, 2000)
- Natalie Merchant, Motherland (Elektra, 2001)
- Tift Merritt, See You on the Moon (Fantasy, 2010)
- Ramsay Midwood, Popular Delusions & The Madness of Cows (Farmwire, 2006)
- Gaby Moreno, Alegoría (Metamorfosis, 2022)
- Geoff Muldaur, Password (HighTone, 2000)
- Anne Murray, Anne Murray (EMI, 1996)
- Meshell Ndegeocello, Bitter (Maverick, 1999)
- Nick 13, Nick 13 (Sugar Hill, 2011)
- Stevie Nicks, In Your Dreams (Reprise, 2011)
- Peter Ostroushko, Coming Down from Red Lodge (Red House, 2003)
- Richard Page, Peculiar Life (Little Dume, 2010)
- Madeleine Peyroux, Half the Perfect World (Rounder, 2006)
- Grant Lee Phillips, Virginia Creeper (Zoë, 2004)
- Rebecca Pidgeon, Behind the Velvet Curtain: Songs from the Motion Picture Redbelt (Great American Music, 2008)
- Robert Plant and Alison Krauss, Raising Sand (Rounder, 2007)
- Lisa Marie Presley, Storm & Grace (Universal Republic, 2012)
- Tristan Prettyman, Cedar + Gold (Capitol, 2012)
- Daft Punk, Random Access Memories (Columbia, 2013)
- Joshua Radin, Simple Times (Mom + Pop, 2008)
- Ronna Reeves, After the Dance (River, 1995)
- Lana Del Rey, Blue Banisters (Polydor, 2021)
- Roxette, Tourism (EMI, 1992)
- Rumer, This Girl's in Love (A Bacharach & David Songbook) (East West, 2016)
- Leon Russell, Life Journey (Universal, 2014)
- Katey Sagal, Covered (eOne, 2013)
- Adam Sandler, What's Your Name? (Warner Bros., 1997)
- Timothy B. Schmit, Expando (Lost Highway, 2009)
- Avenged Sevenfold, Avenged Sevenfold (Warner Bros., 2007)
- Shivaree, I Oughtta Give You a Shot in the Head for Making Me Live in This Dump (Capitol, 1999)
- Michelle Shocked, Got No Strings (Mighty Sound, 2005)
- Ron Sexsmith, Forever Endeavour (Cooking Vinyl, 2013)
- Kevin Sharp, Measure of a Man (Asylum Records, 1996)
- Chris Shiflett, Chris Shiflett & the Dead Peasants (RCA Records, 2010)
- Percy Sledge, Blue Night (Sky France Records, 1994)
- The Smashing Pumpkins, Mellon Collie and the Infinite Sadness (Virgin, 1995)
- Jill Sobule, Dottie's Charms (Pinko, 2014)
- Ringo Starr, Give More Love (Universal Music Enterprises, 2017)
- Ringo Starr, Look Up (UMe, 2025)
- Rod Stewart, Still the Same... Great Rock Classics of Our Time (J, 2006)
- Curtis Stigers, Brighter Days (Columbia Records, 1999)
- Chris Stills, Don't Be Afraid (Rupture Records, 2018)
- Randy Stonehill, Return to Paradise (Myrrh, 1989)
- Syd Straw, Surprise (Virgin, 1989)
- Peter Stuart, Propeller (Vanguard, 2002)
- Natalie D-Napoleon, Leaving Me Dry (Household Ink, 2012)
- Toad the Wet Sprocket, New Constellation (Abe's Records, 2013)
- Jack Tempchin and Richard Stekol, Live on Highway 101 (Night River, 2002)
- Pam Tillis, Sweetheart's Dance (Arista, 1994)
- Allen Toussaint, American Tunes (Nonesuch, 2016)
- Shania Twain, Now (Mercury Nashville, 2017)
- Suzie Vinnick, Happy Here (self-released, 2008)
- Joe Walsh, Analog Man (Fantasy, 2012)
- Was (Not Was), Boo! (Rykodisc, 2008)
- Sara Watkins, Sara Watkins (Nonesuch, 2009)
- Watkins Family Hour, Watkins Family Hour (Family Hour, 2015)
- Paul Westerberg, Suicaine Gratifaction (Capitol, 1999)
- Whiskeytown, Stranger's Almanac (Geffen, 1997)
- Wilco, Being There (Reprise, 1996)
- The Williams Brothers, Harmony Hotel (Warner Bros., 1993)
- Kelly Willis, Translated from Love (Rykodisc, 2007)
- Dan Wilson, Love Without Fear (Ballroom, 2014)
- The Wilsons, The Wilsons (Polygram, 1997)
- Lee Ann Womack, Something Worth Leaving Behind (MCA Nashville, 2002)
- Lizz Wright, Dreaming Wide Awake (Verve, 2005)
- Dwight Yoakam, Hillbilly Deluxe (Reprise, 1987)

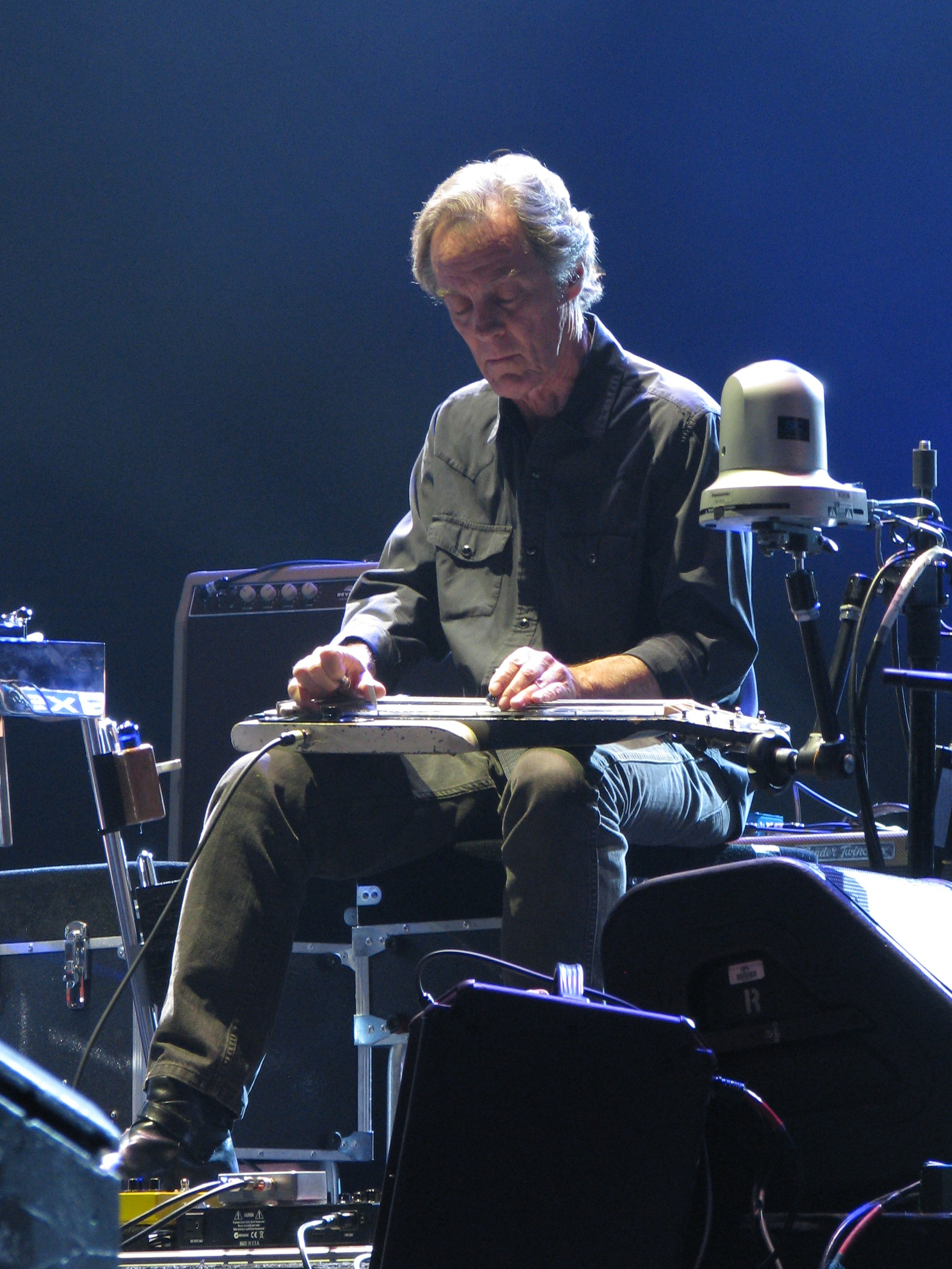
Leisz playing lap steel in Eric Clapton's band, Charlotte, North Carolina, April 2, 2013
