= Community Trolls =

Rock band

Community Trolls was a short-lived musical duo between Michael Stipe of R.E.M. and Matthew Sweet. In 1983, they collaborated as part of the Athens, Georgia, music scene, writing and recording three songs together. One of the compositions, "Tainted Obligation", was nearly released on a compilation album in 1986, and later appeared on bootlegs; it was released officially in 2002. Another Community Trolls' song, "Six Stock Answers", appeared in an unreleased indie film featuring Stipe, Sweet and some of their friends.

Community Trolls, who may have at times included additional band members, performed in public at least twice. However, sometime in 1984, Sweet began distancing himself from the Athens music scene, and in 1985 he got a record deal and moved to New York. While he was accused of using his Athens music connections to get ahead and desert the scene, R.E.M. did not hold any hard feelings towards him.

== Background ==
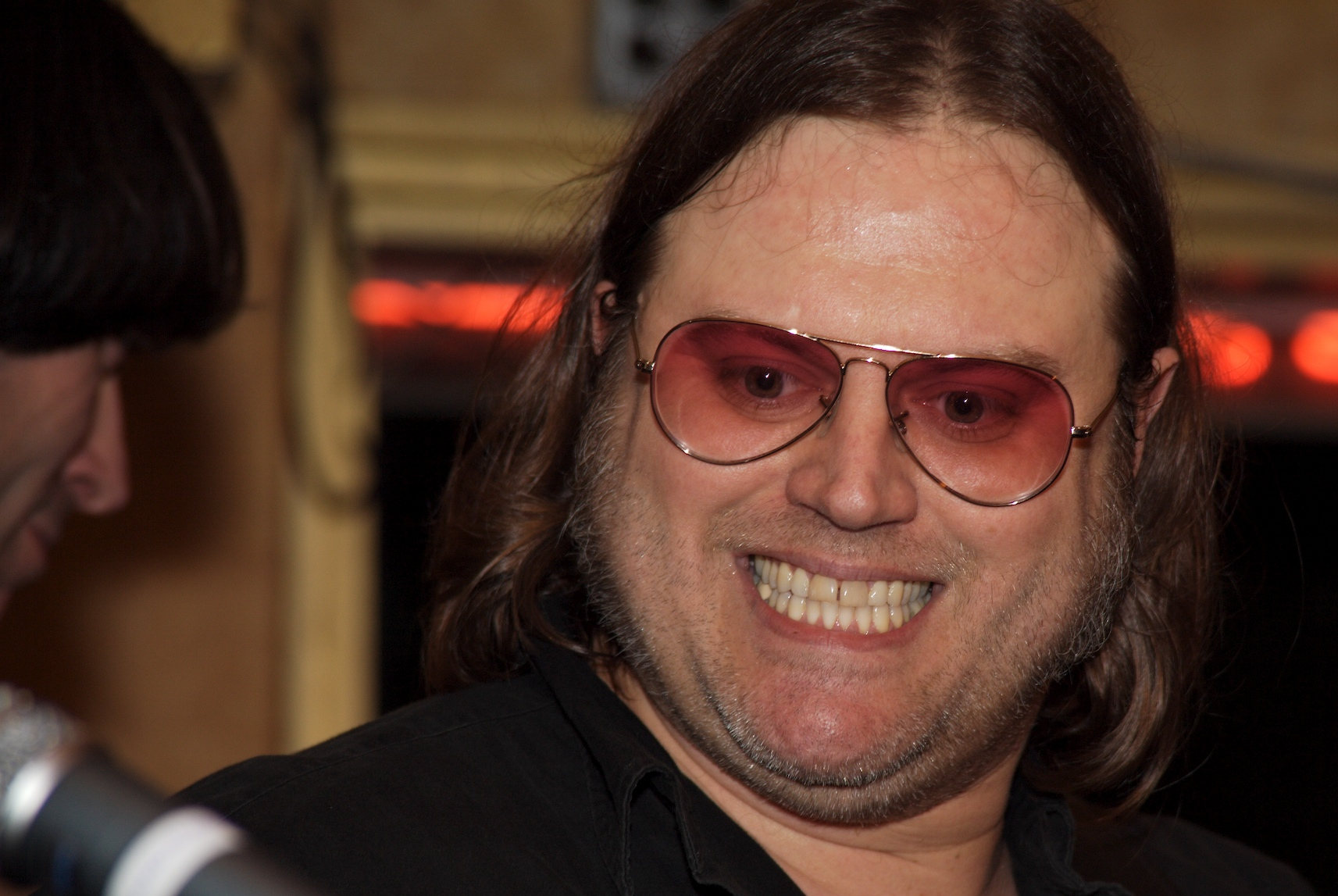
Matthew Sweet (pictured here in 2006) moved to Athens, Georgia, to launch his music career in the early 1980s and formed Community Trolls there

As a teenager in Lincoln, Nebraska, Sweet was a big fan of Mitch Easter. Easter produced R.E.M.'s first single, the Hib-Tone version of "Radio Free Europe". Sweet loved its B-side, "Sitting Still", and became a fan of the band. When R.E.M. performed in Lincoln in September 1982, Sweet went to the show. At that point R.E.M. were still relatively unknown, so there was almost nobody at the concert. Sweet met the band and gave Michael Stipe a tape of songs he had been working on. R.E.M. was from Athens, Georgia, which was becoming famous for its vibrant music scene. Sweet had also read about Athens in New York Rocker magazine.

R.E.M. put Sweet in touch with Easter, who wrote Sweet a number of long letters, and suggested he move to Athens after graduating from high school. Meanwhile, Stipe really liked Sweet's tape, and he also played it for his sister, Lynda, and friend Linda Hopper, who were both in the band Oh-OK. All three sent Sweet postcards saying he should come perform in Athens, with Lynda and Linda inviting him to open for Oh-OK there. Sweet told his parents that he wanted to study at the University of Georgia, in Athens. Within weeks of moving there, he had become a member of Oh-OK, who recorded their EP Furthermore What in August 1983 with him on board. While a member of Oh-OK, Sweet also began collaborating with Michael Stipe as the band Community Trolls.

== Songs ==
Sometime in the autumn of 1983, Stipe and Sweet wrote at least three songs together. Of their songwriting process, Sweet has said: "[Stipe] was the real powerhouse behind it. I was pretty tentative in those days. We just sat around, Michael went through the little book he wrote lyrics in, with me just kind of strumming along behind."

=== "Tainted Obligation" ===
"Tainted Obligation"

Song by Community Trolls

from the album To Understand: The Early Recordings of Matthew Sweet
- Released: October 1, 2002
- Recorded: Fall 1983
- Genre: Country rock
- Length: 3:06
- Label: Hip-O
- Songwriter(s): Michael Stipe and Matthew Sweet
- Producer(s): Community Trolls and John Keane

Audio sample
- file; help

They recorded their three compositions with producer John Keane that fall, but only one of the tracks from the session, "Tainted Obligation", has been officially released. Stipe plays accordion on the song, and Sweet acoustic guitar, with vocals by both.

In 1986, "Tainted Obligation" was planned for inclusion on the Zippo/Demon Records compilation album Don't Shoot, but ultimately was left off. It was included on a UK cassette advance version of the compilation, but was removed before the album was officially released. In the early 1990s, the song surfaced as "Tainted Obligations" on R.E.M. bootlegs such as Stab It and Steer It and Chestnut. The track was released officially on the 2002 Matthew Sweet compilation To Understand: The Early Recordings of Matthew Sweet. In a review of the album, Rolling Stone critic Gavin Edwards describes the song as "enchanting" and as having "harmonies as pretty as you can imagine".

=== "Six Stock Answers" and "My Roof to Your Roof" ===
Two other documented Community Trolls' songs are entitled "Six Stock Answers" and "My Roof to Your Roof". "Six Stock Answers", whose vocals are by Stipe, was used in an unreleased low-budget forty-five-minute Super-8 film called Just Like a Movie. It was shot in September 1983 in Athens by New York Rocker photographer Laura Levine, a friend of the members of R.E.M. Those with acting roles included Levine, Michael Stipe, Sweet, Hopper, Lynda Stipe, and R.E.M.'s Bill Berry. One scene in the film, a parody of the "Subterranean Homesick Blues" sequence in D. A. Pennebaker's Bob Dylan documentary Dont Look Back, shows Michael Stipe wearing a skirt and tights flipping placards with the song's lyrics, "Six stock answers to 74,000 questions" repeated ad nauseam. Just Like a Movie's plot has two rival bands performing on the same night, leading up to the climax question of "Which band is everybody going to go see?"

== Live performances ==
Community Trolls' first public performance was busking outside the 40 Watt Club in Athens in September, 1983. On September 30, Community Trolls played a set between two R.E.M. sets at the Stitchcraft in Athens, performing four songs: "Six Stock Answers", "My Roof to Your Roof", "Tainted Obligation" and the Velvet Underground's "Pale Blue Eyes". (R.E.M. biographer Marcus Gray believes it is likely that footage of the show, including the Trolls' set, was used in Just Like a Movie.) Part of R.E.M.'s performance, and the Trolls' four songs, have been released on the R.E.M. bootleg 20th Century Boys Volume 1. Sweet performed with members of R.E.M. at least one other time while he was in Athens: When R.E.M. shared a bill with Oh-OK on October 3, 1983, at the University of Georgia's Legion Field, Sweet joined R.E.M. onstage and played guitar.

== Possible other band members ==
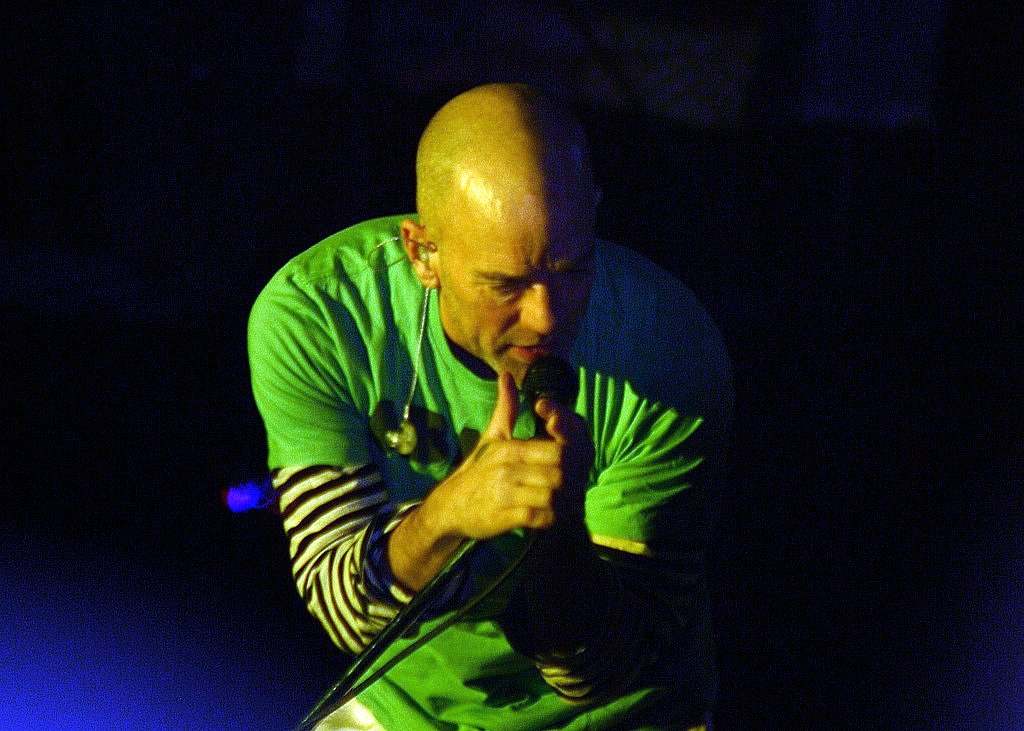
Michael Stipe (pictured here in 2008) is one of two confirmed members of Community Trolls

Although only Stipe and Sweet performed in the studio on "Tainted Obligation", it is not clear whether other musicians may have sometimes been included in the band. Gray writes that "the line-up of the Community Trolls remains elusive, but Sweet was guitarist and singer". In the book Rolling Stone's Alt-Rock-A-Rama, their line-up is described as an "Athens-based, looseknit ensemble, which included Matthew Sweet, [and which] featured Michael Stipe's vocals on a handful of tracks".

== Aftermath ==
Around the time as he was collaborating with Stipe, and while still a member of Oh-OK, Sweet began writing songs for another project, the Buzz of Delight, which consisted of Sweet and former Oh-OK drummer David Pierce. In October 1983, they recorded a six-song EP, Soundcastles, released in the spring of 1984 on DB Records, and performed in New York, Florida and Georgia State to promote it. In the summer and November 1984, the Buzz of Delight recorded more songs, none of which were immediately released. (In 1990, one previously unreleased Buzz of Delight track appeared on the DB Records compilation Squares Blot out the Sun, and, in 2002, three others on To Understand.) Meanwhile, Stipe continued his work with R.E.M., who were getting acclaim and success with their album Murmur. In 1983, it was named album of the year by Rolling Stone and Trouser Press, and by the middle of 1984, it had sold 200,000 copies. In November 1983, R.E.M. began recording their follow-up, Reckoning.

Sweet began distancing himself from other people in the Athens music scene and in 1984 quit Oh-OK; by 1985, the Buzz of Delight had broken up. That year, Sweet got a record deal with CBS Records and moved to New York City. He was accused of being opportunistic and using his Athens connections to get a record deal and leave. Sweet maintains that when he went to CBS, he never claimed to have anything to do with Athens, so that nobody could say he used the town. He says that after months of living in Athens, he realized things weren't as happy there as everyone pretended, and that there was backstabbing going on. In 1993, he said, "Things really turned dark there when R.E.M. got famous, because everyone wanted that fame so bad. Maybe I wanted it too, but I had this musical goal all of my own and wasn't going to go along with the way it was done there." Everybody was telling him that he should be touring and building up a following before doing his record, like R.E.M. had done. However, more than making the record itself and becoming a rock star, Sweet's main motivation was to get money to buy studio gear.

R.E.M., for their part, held no hard feelings towards Sweet. Peter Buck has said, "The guy wanted to make records. I don't see anything wrong with that." Years later, Sweet recorded with R.E.M.'s Mike Mills on the song "The Ballad of El Goodo", on the Big Star tribute Big Star, Small World. It was originally scheduled to come out in 1998, but its release was delayed until 2006. On March 26, 2011, Sweet and Mills performed the Big Star song "September Gurls" together live at a tribute to Big Star singer Alex Chilton; Stipe also performed at this concert, singing "The Letter", by Chilton's 1960s group, the Box Tops.
