= Under the Covers, Vol. 1 =

Studio album by Matthew Sweet and Susanna Hoffs
- Released: April 18, 2006
- Recorded: Lolina Green (Matthew Sweet's home studio)
- Genre: Rock
- Length: 49:32
- Label: Shout! Factory
- Producers: Matthew Sweet, Susanna Hoffs

Matthew Sweet chronology
Living Things (2004)	Under the Covers, Vol. 1 (2006)	The Pillowcase EP (2006)

Susanna Hoffs chronology
Susanna Hoffs (1996)	Under the Covers, Vol. 1 (2006)	Under the Covers, Vol. 2 (2009)

Professional ratings
Review scores
Source	Rating
Allmusic	3/5 stars
Hybrid Magazine	(favorable)

Under the Covers, Vol. 1 is the first collaboration between alternative rock artist Matthew Sweet and Bangles singer/guitarist Susanna Hoffs. Released by Shout! Factory in 2006, the album contains 15 cover versions of songs from the 1960s and 1970s. The album was a result of their mutual love for songwriting from the 1960s.

The album was released on April 18, 2006, and they appeared July 18 on Late Night with Conan O'Brien to promote the album and tour.

== Track listing ==
#	Title	Original artist	Length
1.	"I See the Rain"	The Marmalade	3:45
2.	"And Your Bird Can Sing"	The Beatles	2:10
3.	"It's All Over Now, Baby Blue"	Bob Dylan	3:45
4.	"Who Knows Where the Time Goes?"	Fairport Convention	5:51
5.	"Cinnamon Girl"	Neil Young and Crazy Horse	2:47
6.	"Alone Again Or"	Love	3:35
7.	"The Warmth of the Sun"	The Beach Boys	3:08
8.	"Different Drum"	Stone Poneys featuring Linda Ronstadt	2:52
9.	"The Kids Are Alright"	The Who	2:50
10.	"Sunday Morning"	The Velvet Underground	3:26
11.	"Everybody Knows This Is Nowhere"	Neil Young and Crazy Horse	2:27
12.	"Care of Cell 44"	The Zombies	3:56
13.	"Monday, Monday"	The Mamas & the Papas	3:27
14.	"She May Call You Up Tonight"	The Left Banke	2:24
15.	"Run to Me"	Bee Gees	3:06

== Bonus Tracks on iTunes Deluxe Version ==
#	Title	Original artist	Length
16.	"The Village Green Preservation Society"	The Kinks	2:57
17.	"I Can See for Miles"	The Who	4:13

== Volumes 2 & 3 ==
In July 2009, Shout! Factory released their second album, Under the Covers, Vol. 2, covering songs from the 1970s. Under the Covers, Vol. 3 followed in 2013, containing songs recorded in the 1980s. The 2015 boxset Completely Under the Covers collects all three volumes, including the bonus tracks previously only available on the iTunes deluxe editions.

== Personnel ==
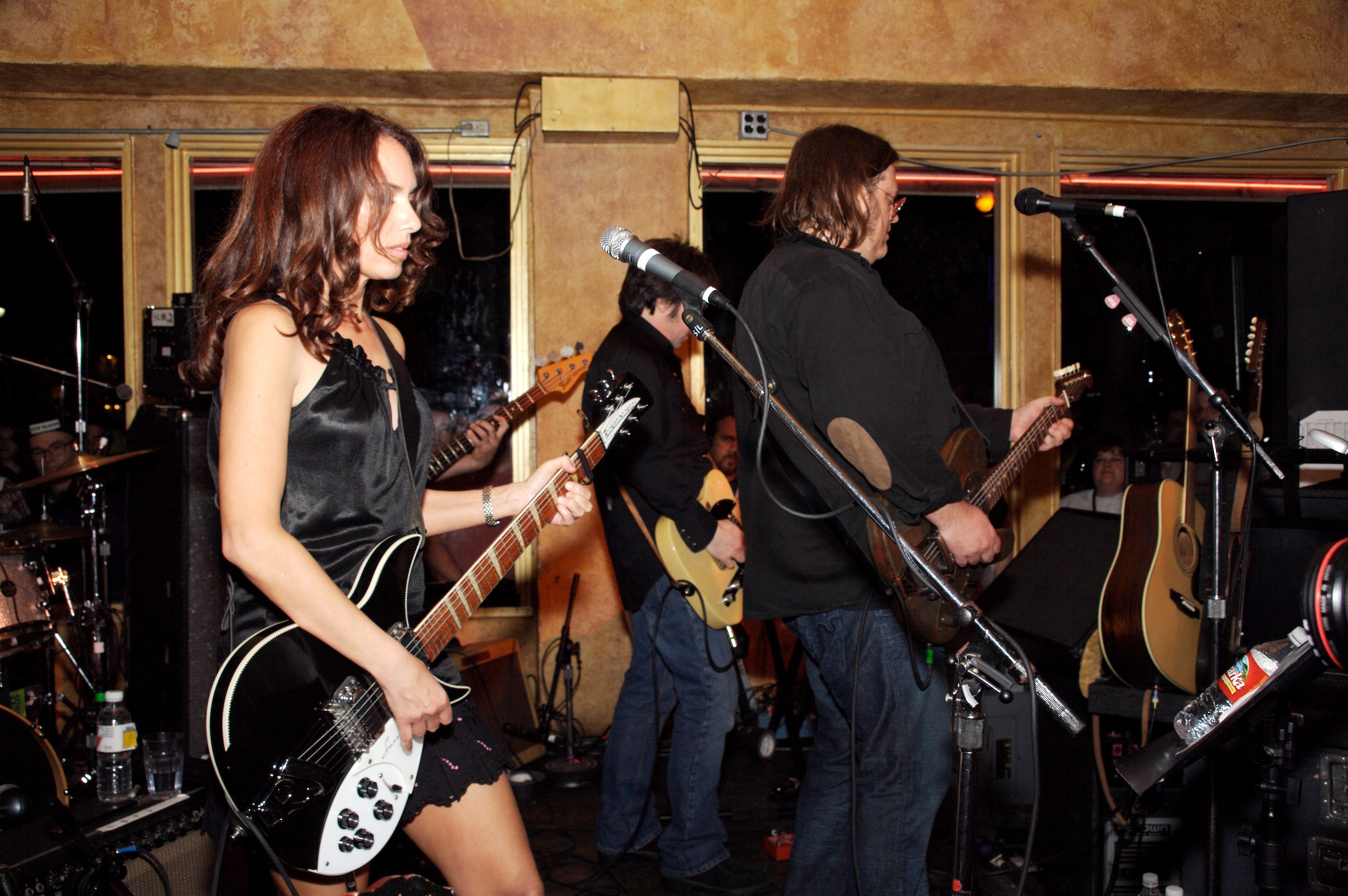
Susanna Hoffs and Matthew Sweet at SXSW 2006 in Austin, Texas

- Susanna Hoffs – vocals, handclaps (2)
- Matthew Sweet – vocals, bass, organ (1), electric lead guitar (1), electric rhythm guitar (1), acoustic guitars (2–4, 6–8, 11, 13–15), electric guitars (2, 3, 5, 7, 9–11, 13, 14), tambourine (2), handclaps (2), Mellotron (8, 12), xylophone (10), acoustic piano (12, 14), harpsichord (12, 13), dolceola (12), percussion (13)
- Van Dyke Parks – organ (3), acoustic piano (8), harpsichord (8)
- Richard Lloyd – electric lead guitar (1, 5), lead guitar (3)
- Ivan Julian – acoustic guitar (3, 8), electric lead guitar (6), feedback guitar (10)
- Greg Leisz – electric guitar (4), pedal steel guitar (4, 10), acoustic lead guitar (6), electric 12-string guitar (8, 15), electric lead guitar (8, 11), 12-string guitar (12)
- Ric Menck – drums, tambourine (2, 3, 13–15), bongos (6), shaker (6)
- Carey LeMothe – trumpet (6, 15), French horn (15)
- Joseph Harvey – cello (6, 8, 13–15)
- Julie Pusch – viola (6, 8, 13), violin (6, 8, 13–15)

=== Production ===
- Shawn Amos – executive producer
- Susanna Hoffs – producer
- Matthew Sweet – producer, engineer, remixing
- Bob Ludwig – mastering at Gateway Mastering (Portland, Maine)
- Julee Stover – editorial supervision
- Emily Johnson – project assistant
- John Roberts – project assistant
- Ed Fotheringham – illustrations
- Jeff Palo – artwork, package supervision
- Todd Gallopo – package design
- Henry Diltz – photography
- Russell Carter Artist Management Ltd. – management

== Chart performance ==
Date	Chart	Peak position
May 6, 2006	Billboard 200	192
