= Oh-OK =

US musical group

- Origin: Athens, Georgia, United States
- Genres: Rock, post-punk
- Years active: 1981–1984
- Past members: Linda Hopper; Lynda Stipe; David Pierce; David McNair; Matthew Sweet

Oh-OK was an American musical group from Athens, Georgia, formed in 1981 with singer/lyricist Linda Hopper, bassist/vocalist/lyricist Lynda Stipe, and drummer David Pierce. Other members later included drummer David McNair and guitarist Matthew Sweet. The trio began practicing together at parties in the college community in the spring of 1981. Their first club performance break came when Stipe's brother, Michael Stipe of R.E.M., opened for Oh-OK at a show at the 40 Watt Club.

== History ==
Oh-OK was an Athens, Georgia band that formed in 1981. The group's unusual sound combined with Hopper and Stipe's non-linear lyrics, percolating bass melody lines by Stipe and the dance-oriented drumming of Pierce, created a unique stripped-down pop sound that was critically praised by Robert Christgau of the Village Voice. With only five songs and barely a month old, the trio toured New York and New Jersey in the summer of 1981 with fellow Athens band Pylon. On that tour, the band played at the venerable New York club Danceteria to a sold-out show. By the fall of 1981 Oh-OK was invited to record with Atlanta record label DB Records. The band's Wow Mini Album, a 3-song 45 rpm record, which included "Lilting", a 59-second pop-dance song, gave them national and international radio play on many alternative and college stations. After touring to support the record, Pierce left the band and David McNair joined the lineup as a drummer. After several temporary lineup changes, the band incorporated a guitar sound with the addition of Matthew Sweet. His songwriting, performing and recording skills pushed the band into traditional rock music territory with the band's EP Furthermore What.

While playing and touring with Oh-OK, Sweet and former drummer Pierce formed the short-lived pop duo The Buzz of Delight producing a 45 rpm single "Christmas" and an EP Sound Castles on DB Records. Sweet was rapidly signed to Capitol Records and embarked on a successful solo career. Pierce began a successful career as Funk Music DJ and Disco Revival nightclub promoter Romeo Cologne. Hopper made a name for herself fronting Magnapop, with McNair joining her on drums. Stipe became the lead singer of Hetch Hetchy under the name Lynda L. Limner; she went on to play in Flash to Bang Time. In 2002, a compilation of their recordings—The Complete Recordings—was released by Collector's Choice Music, with liner notes by Robert Christgau. The band reunited without Pierce for a concert at the 40 Watt Club as part of the 2006 Athens Popfest.

== Discography ==
- Wow Mini Album 7", 1982 (DB Records DB63)
- Furthermore What 12", 1983 (DB Records DB69)
- "Random", appearing on the various artists LP compilation Squares Blot Out the Sun, 1990 (DB Records DB69)
- The Complete Recordings Compact disc, 2002 (Collector's Choice Music 293)

== See also ==
- Change (Cindy Wilson album), from 2017, featuring an Oh-OK cover
- Community Trolls
- Magnapop
- Music of Athens, Georgia
- Tres Chicas
