= Catspaw (album) =

Studio album by Matthew Sweet
- Released: January 15, 2021
- Recorded: 2019
- Studio: Black Squirrel Submarine (Omaha, Nebraska)
- Genre: Indie pop; power pop
- Length: 39:55
- Label: Omnivore
- Producer: Matthew Sweet

Matthew Sweet chronology
Wicked System of Things (2018)	Catspaw (2021)

Professional ratings
Aggregate scores
Source	Rating
Metacritic	77/100
Review scores
Source	Rating
AllMusic	4/5 stars
American Songwriter	2.5/5 stars
Mojo	4/5 stars
Uncut	7/10

Catspaw is the fifteenth studio album by American singer-songwriter Matthew Sweet. It was released on January 15, 2021, through Omnivore Recordings.

== Background ==
Recording and instrumentation for the album was completed in 2019, while in Sweet's home studio, prior to the COVID-19 pandemic. Velvet Crush drummer Ric Menck collaborates on majority of the songs through the album.

== Release ==
The first single "Stars Explode" was released on December 12, 2020.

== Critical reception ==
Catspaw was met with "generally favorable" reviews from critics. At Metacritic, which assigns a weighted average rating out of 100 to reviews from mainstream publications, this release received an average score of 77 based on 5 reviews.

Matt Collar of AllMusic said: "Matthew Sweet's 15th studio album and third since moving from Los Angeles to his home state of Nebraska, 2021's Catspaw finds him further digging into his anthemic power pop and tube-amp guitar wizardry. Catspaw is a darker, rawer-sounding album than both of its predecessors, with a more focused and uniform aesthetic. Part of this focus comes from Sweet playing all of the instruments except for drums, which were supplied by his longtime collaborator and Velvet Crush member Ric Menck." Writing for American Songwriter, Hal Horowitz wrote: "Sweet’s insistence on his guitar taking the spotlight starts to wear thin by about the halfway point in these dozen tunes. The songwriting, taken individually, is generally strong and immediately recognizable as Mathew Sweet penned. But the production and approach is so similar on every track that the effect is diluted." Stephen Delusner of Uncut stated: "For his 15th album, the Omaha [sic - Sweet is from Lincoln] native takes over lead, along with every other instrument but drums. Sweet emerges as an ingenious guitar player in his own right, one who has absorbed and tweaked the lessons of his celebrated collaborators."

== Track listing ==
All tracks are written by Matthew Sweet.

Catspaw track listing
No.	Title	Length
1.	"Blown Away"	4:13
2.	"Give a Little"	3:16
3.	"Challenge the Gods"	3:56
4.	"Come Home"	3:10
5.	"Drifting"	3:28
6.	"Best of Me"	2:46
7.	"Stars Explode"	3:10
8.	"Hold On Tight"	2:54
9.	"At a Loss"	3:36
10.	"No Surprise"	4:00
11.	"Coming Soon"	2:38
12.	"Parade of Lights"	2:44
Total length:		39:55

== Personnel ==
- Matthew Sweet – Höfner bass guitar, Novo rhythm and lead guitars, piano, all vocals, production, recording, mixing
- Ric Menck – drums
- Bob Ludwig – mastering
- Jeff Powell – vinyl mastering
- Greg Allen – art direction, design
