= Wicked System of Things =

Studio album by Matthew Sweet
- Released: November 23, 2018
- Recorded: Early 2017
- Studio: Block Squirrel Submarine, Omaha, Nebraska, United States
- Genre: Power pop
- Length: 35:13
- Language: English
- Label: Honeycomb Hideout
- Producer: Matthew Sweet

Matthew Sweet chronology
Tomorrow's Daughter (2018)	Wicked System of Things (2018)	Catspaw (2021)

Wicked System of Things is a 2018 studio album by American singer-songwriter Matthew Sweet.

== Recording, release, and reception ==
Sweet recorded the songs for Wicked System of Things in his Omaha home studio in early 2017. He discussed the prospect of collaborating with Cheap Trick members Rick Nielsen and Tom Petersson and wrote this music as an expression of his love of Midwest power pop, but both musical acts were too busy to record together, so Sweet decided to put the songs to record himself and release it as a Record Store Day exclusive in 2018. Sweet chose an apocalyptic title used by Jehovah's Witnesses and paintings of desolation, but the album content does not focus on dark themes.

Writing in The Lincoln Journal-Star, L. Kent Wolgamott opined that this album "doesn’t feel like scraps thrown together to put something out" but that "it’s an album that’s as strong and cohesive as its predecessors, which are Sweet’s best work in at least a decade".

== Track listing ==
All songs written by Matthew Sweet

1. "Alone with Everybody" – 2:51
2. "Baby Talk" – 2:57
3. "Electric Guitar" – 2:55
4. "Good Girls Are Gone" – 2:46
5. "Counting the Days" – 2:55
6. "Eternity Now" – 3:25
7. "The Biggest Lies" – 3:45
8. "Flashback" – 3:31
9. "It's a Charade" – 4:12
10. "Backwards Upside Down" – 2:46
11. "Split Mind" – 3:10

== Personnel ==
- Matthew Sweet – bass guitar, guitar, vocals, engineering, mixing, production
- Evan Carter – photography
- Sean Magee – mastering at Abbey Road Studios, London, England, United Kingdom
- Ric Menck – drums
- Dan Miggler – art direction at Noiseland Industries
- Harold "Abruzzi" Stephenson – back cover painting
- John Stancin – inner gatefold painting
- Jason Victor – lead guitar
- Robert Watson – front cover painting

== See also ==
- List of 2018 albums
