= Earth (Matthew Sweet album) =

Studio album by Matthew Sweet
- Released: January 23, 1989
- Studio: Axis Studios, Skyline Studios and Right Track Recording (New York, NY): The Enterprise (Burbank, CA)
- Genre: Alternative rock
- Length: 39:36
- Label: A&M
- Producer: Dave Allen, Fred Maher, Matthew Sweet

Matthew Sweet chronology
| Inside (1986) | Earth (1989) | Girlfriend (1991) |

Professional ratings
Review scores
| Source | Rating |
|---|---|
| Allmusic | 2.5/5 stars |
| Rolling Stone | 3/5 stars |

Earth is the second album by alternative rock musician Matthew Sweet. It was released on A&M Records in 1989.

== Details ==
In 1996, Sweet provided backing vocals for Kris McKay in a cover of his own song, "How Cool", on her album, Things That Show.

== Track listing ==
All songs written by Matthew Sweet, except where noted

1. "Easy" - 4:21
2. "When I Feel Again" - 3:36
3. "Wind and the Sun" - 3:39
4. "Children of Time (Forever)" - 3:49
5. "Love" (Sweet, Fred Maher) - 4:42
6. "Vertigo" (Sweet, Maher) - 4:32
7. "Underground" - 3:36
8. "The Alcohol Talking" (Sweet, Maher) - 3:15
9. "Vixen" - 3:21
10. "How Cool" - 2:35
11. "Having a Bad Dream" - 3:27

== Personnel ==
- Matthew Sweet – vocals, programming, rhythm guitars (1, 2, 4–11), bass (1, 3, 5–11), lead guitar (2), all guitars (3)
- Fred Maher – programming
- Richard Lloyd – lead guitar (1, 2, 8), rhythm guitars (4, 6, 9), middle lead guitar (7)
- Gary Lucas – lead guitar (5), slide guitar (5), wah wah guitar (6), dobro (11)
- Robert Quine – rhythm guitars (5, 10), lead guitar (6), electric guitar (11)
- Ric Menck – drum samples, additional programming (2)
- Trip Shakespeare – backing vocals (1–10)
- Leah Kunkel – backing vocals (2, 3, 5–10), BGV coordinator
- Lana Delve – backing vocals (8)
- Kate Pierson – backing vocals (9)

=== Production ===
- David M. Allen – producer, recording
- Fred Maher – producer, drum sample recording, mixing (11)
- Matthew Sweet – producer, mixing (11)
- David Leonard – drum sample recording, mixing (1–10)
- Scott Litt – drum sample recording
- Bill Esses – second engineer
- Jeff Abikzer – recording assistant
- Keith Freedman – recording assistant
- Lori Fumar – mix assistant
- Bob Ludwig – mastering at Masterdisk (New York, NY)
- Harris Savides – photography
- Richard Frankel – art direction, design
- Rick Smith – management
