= Inside (Matthew Sweet album) =

Studio album by Matthew Sweet
- Released: 1986
- Studio: The Power Station, RPM Studios, Unique Recording Studios, Right Track Recording, Soundworks, The Hit Factory (New York City, New York); The Sound Factory (Hollywood, California); Can-Am Recorders (Tarzana, California); Park Avenue Sound (Massachusetts); RG Jones, Good Earth Studios, Marquee Studios, Westside Studios, Advision Studios, Air Studios, Mayfair Studios and Battery Studios, (London, UK).
- Genre: Alternative rock
- Length: 41:22
- Label: Columbia
- Producer: Matthew Sweet, David Kahne, François Kevorkian, Stephen Hague, Ron Saint Germain, Don Dixon, David M. Allen, Alan Tarney

Matthew Sweet chronology
Inside (1986)	Earth (1989)

Professional ratings
Review scores
Source	Rating
AllMusic	2.5/5 stars
The Encyclopedia of Popular Music	2/5 stars
MusicHound Rock: The Essential Album Guide	2.5/5 stars
The Rolling Stone Album Guide	3.5/5 stars
Spin Alternative Record Guide	5/10

Inside is the debut album by alternative rock musician Matthew Sweet. It was released on Columbia Records in 1986. Sweet was dropped from the label after the album's release, and would not put out another record for three years.

== Production ==
The album was recorded in multiple studios with a large number of producers and musicians, including Bernie Worrell, Chris Stamey, Scott Litt, Don Dixon, and Aimee Mann, among others.

== Critical reception ==
Trouser Press called the album "a bit like R.E.M. and early dB’s doing sincere power-pop with keyboards." The Rolling Stone Album Guide wrote that the songs "come across like the snappy work of a brainy Tommy James." The Spin Alternative Record Guide called Inside "notable only because it features ten different producers, none of whom have a clue what to do with Sweet's music." The Chicago Reader called it "tuneful and pleasant but ... sunk by the electropop, machine-driven production Sweet was pursuing."

== Track listing ==
No.	Title	Writer(s)	Producer(s)	Length
1.	"Quiet Her"	Matthew Sweet	Scott Litt	3:27
2.	"Blue Fools"	Sweet	David Kahne	3:43
3.	"We Lose Another Day"	Sweet; Pal Shazar	Stephen Hague	3:11
4.	"Catch Your Breath"	Sweet	David M. Allen; Matthew Sweet	4:00
5.	"Half Asleep"	Sweet	Simon Hanhart	4:26
6.	"This Above All"	Sweet	Litt; Don Dixon	3:50
7.	"Save Time for Me"	Sweet; Jules Shear	Alan Tarney	4:14
8.	"By Herself"	Sweet; Adele Bertei	François Kevorkian; Ron St. Germain	3:47
9.	"Brotherhood"	Sweet; Shazar	Allen; Sweet	3:31
10.	"Love I Trusted"	Sweet	Kevorkian; St. Germain	4:15
11.	"Watch You Walking"	Sweet; Shazar	Hague	2:57

== Personnel ==
- Matthew Sweet – vocals, lead guitar (1), rhythm guitars (1), bass (1–3, 9, 11), acoustic guitar (3, 6, 8, 11), guitars (3, 7–9, 11), all instruments (4), keyboard figures (7), keyboards (8–10)
- Bernie Worrell – Yamaha DX7 (1), organ (1)
- Howard Benson – keyboards (2), programming (2), sequencing (2)
- David Kahne – keyboards (2), acoustic guitar (2)
- Rob Fisher – keyboards (5)
- Tommy Mandel – keyboards (6)
- Rob Sabino – keyboards (6)
- Alan Tarney – keyboards (7), acoustic piano (7), LinnDrum programming (7)
- John Mahoney – Synclavier programming (8)
- Jim Telfir – keyboards (9)
- David M. Allen – programming (9), sequencing (9)
- Jody Harris – rhythm guitars (1)
- Rusty Anderson – guitars (2)
- Steve Bolton – guitars (5)
- Keith Mack – guitars (6)
- John McCurry – guitar solo (8)
- John McGeoch – guitar solo (9)
- Mike Campbell – guitars (10)
- Chris Stamey – bass (1)
- Phil Spalding – bass (5)
- Gerry Thomas – keyboard bass (8), keyboards (10), keyboard solo (10), bass (10)
- Anton Fier – drums (1, 2, 6)
- Fred Maher – drum programming (3, 10, 11), keyboard programming (8), drums (8, 10), percussion (8)
- Tony Beard – drums (5)
- Debbi Peterson – backing vocals (2)
- Vicki Peterson – backing vocals (2)
- Eddie – backing vocals (4)
- Don Dixon – backing vocals (6)
- Aimee Mann – backing vocals (6)
- Adele Bertei – backing vocals (8)
- Valerie Simpson – backing vocals (8)
- Sara Sweet – backing vocals (9)

== Production ==
- Steve Rallbovsky – executive producer
- Scott Litt – producer (1, 6), engineer (1, 6), mixing (2, 4, 9)
- David Kahne – producer (2)
- Stephen Hague – producer (3, 11)
- David M. Allen – producer (4, 9)
- Matthew Sweet – producer (4)
- Simon Hanhart – producer (5), engineer (5)
- Don Dixon – producer (6)
- Alan Tarney – producer (7)
- François Kervorkian – producer (8, 10)
- Ron St. Germain – producer (8, 10), recording (8, 10), mixing (8, 10)
- Tchad Blake – engineer (2)
- David Jacob – mixing (3, 11)
- Gordon Futter – engineer (4)
- Gerry Kitchenham – engineer (7)
- John Hudson – mixing (7)
- Mark Saunders – engineer (9)
- Jon Goldenberger – assistant engineer (1, 6)
- Jay Healy – assistant engineer (1), mix assistant (4)
- Mike Krowiak – assistant engineer (6)
- Noel Rafferty – assistant engineer (7)
- Acar Key – recording assistant (8, 10)
- Billy Miranda – recording assistant (8)
- Dennis Mitchell – mix assistant (8), recording assistant (10)
- Greg Calbi – mastering at Sterling Sound (New York, NY)
- Stephen Byram – design
- Harris Savides – photography
- Tony Meilandt and AGM Management – management
