= Living Things (Matthew Sweet album) =

Studio album by Matthew Sweet
- Released: September 7, 2004
- Recorded: July–August 2002
- Studio: Los Angeles, California
- Genre: Alternative rock
- Label: RCAM Records
- Producer: Matthew Sweet

Matthew Sweet chronology
Kimi Ga Suki (2003)	Living Things (2004)	Under the Covers, Vol. 1 (2006)

Professional ratings
Review scores
Source	Rating
AllMusic	3.5/5 stars
Rolling Stone	(favorable)

Living Things is the ninth studio album by alternative rock musician Matthew Sweet. It was released on RCAM Records in 2004.

== Release ==
The album was met with little commercial success, but with favorable reviews. Review aggregating website Metacritic reports a normalized score of 70% based on 9 reviews. Uncut magazine wrote that Living Things was "as ambitious and compelling as psych-tinged pop gets."

== Details ==
The song, "Cats Vs. Dogs", was featured in the film, Garfield: The Movie.

== Track listing ==
All songs written by Matthew Sweet.

1. "The Big Cats of Shambala" – 5:32
2. "You're Not Sorry" – 4:16
3. "Dandelion" – 5:12
4. "Push the Feelings" – 3:06
5. "In My Tree" – 5:13
6. "Cats Vs. Dogs" – 3:51
7. "I Saw Red" – 5:17
8. "In My Time" – 3:57
9. "Sunlight" – 5:56
10. "Season Is Over" – 4:21
11. "Tomorrow" – 3:44

Japanese Copy Control CD version was released with two bonus tracks:

12. "Walk on the Edge (Demo)"
13. "Season Is Over (Demo)"

== Personnel ==
- Matthew Sweet – vocals, acoustic guitar, electric bass, theremin (3), 6-string bass (6), acoustic E-bow guitar (8), clavioline (9)
- Van Dyke Parks – organ (1, 4, 6, 9, 10), acoustic piano (2, 3, 5, 6, 9), electric harpsichord (4, 9), marxophone (4, 9), accordion (11)
- Greg Leisz – mandola (1–3, 10, 11), mandolin (2, 3, 10, 11), slide guitar (4, 5), cats (6), acoustic slide guitar (7), electric mando-guitar (8, 11)
- Peter Phillips – jazz guitars (6), dogs (6), acoustic guitar (7–9)
- Tony Marsico – double bass
- Ric Menck – drums, percussion
- Doug Lacy – steel drums (1)
- Roger Handy – harmonica (7)

=== Production ===
- Matthew Sweet – producer, recording, mixing
- Ash Arnett – art direction, design
- Mary Beth Lumley – art direction, design
- Russell Carter Artist Management Ltd. – management
