= Tomorrow's Daughter =

Studio album by Matthew Sweet
- Released: May 18, 2018
- Length: 39:36
- Label: Honeycomb Hideout

Matthew Sweet chronology
Tomorrow Forever (2017)	Tomorrow's Daughter (2018)	Wicked System of Things (2018)

Professional ratings
Aggregate scores
Source	Rating
Metacritic	73/100
Review scores
Source	Rating
AllMusic	3.5/5 stars
American Songwriter	2.5/5 stars
Rolling Stone	3.5/5 stars

Tomorrow's Daughter is the thirteenth studio album by alternative rock musician Matthew Sweet. It was released on May 18, 2018, under Sweet's Honeycomb Hideout, a label under Sony Music.

== Critical reception ==
Tomorrow's Daughter was met with generally favorable reviews from critics. At Metacritic, which assigns a weighted average rating out of 100 to reviews from mainstream publications, this release received an average score of 73, based on 5 reviews.

== Track listing ==
Tomorrow's Daughter track listing
No.	Title	Length
1.	"I Belong to You"	3:04
2.	"Run Away"	3:10
3.	"Lady Frankenstein"	2:48
4.	"Years"	3:00
5.	"Out of My Misery"	2:44
6.	"Something Someone"	4:08
7.	"Girl with Cat"	3:36
8.	"Now Was the Future"	2:45
9.	"Ever After"	3:25
10.	"Show Me"	3:40
11.	"Can't Pretend"	3:34
12.	"Passerby"	3:42

== Charts ==
Chart performance for Tomorrow's Daughter
Chart (2018)	Peak position
US Independent Albums (Billboard)	42
