= Tomorrow Forever =

Studio album by Matthew Sweet
- Released: June 16, 2017
- Genre: Pop/rock
- Length: 59:04
- Producer: Matthew Sweet

Matthew Sweet chronology
| Under the Covers, Vol. 3 (2013) | Tomorrow Forever (2017) | Tomorrow's Daughter (2018) |

Tomorrow Forever is the twelfth album by alternative rock musician Matthew Sweet, funded wholly by his fans through the crowdfunding platform Kickstarter. It was released on June 16, 2017, as a digital download, CD, and a 2-LP vinyl set.

== Production ==
The album was funded by a Kickstarter campaign from June 27 – July 27, 2014. The album's expected April 2015 release date was delayed to June 2017. Sweet originally recorded 38 songs and cut this down to 17 for the final album, which was the reason for the delay in release. Twelve of the remaining 21 tracks were released in a bonus demo album (Tomorrow's Daughter), sent exclusively to backers of the campaign on Kickstarter, and intended for official release later.

== Release ==
The album charted at number 27 on the Billboard Independent Albums chart. Critics generally praised the album but highlighted its familiarity with his earlier albums. The review aggregating website Metacritic reports a normalized score of 77% based on 4 critic reviews.

Professional ratings
Aggregate scores
| Source | Rating |
|---|---|
| Metacritic | 77/100 |
Review scores
| Source | Rating |
| AllMusic | 3.5/5 stars |
| American Songwriter | 3.5/5 stars |
| Paste Magazine | 7.6/10 |

== Track listing ==
All tracks are written by Matthew Sweet.

| No. | Title | Length |
|---|---|---|
| 1. | "Trick" | 3:40 |
| 2. | "Entangled" | 2:44 |
| 3. | "Pretty Please" | 2:30 |
| 4. | "You Knew Me" | 2:50 |
| 5. | "Circle" | 3:03 |
| 6. | "Haunted" | 4:20 |
| 7. | "Country Girl" | 3:46 |
| 8. | "Off the Farm" | 2:40 |
| 9. | "Nobody Knows" | 2:26 |
| 10. | "The Searcher" | 4:20 |
| 11. | "Music for Love" | 2:43 |
| 12. | "Bittersweet" | 4:08 |
| 13. | "Come Correct" | 3:28 |
| 14. | "Finally" | 3:38 |
| 15. | "Carol" | 3:37 |
| 16. | "Hello" | 4:54 |
| 17. | "End is Near" | 4:17 |
| Total length: | | 59:04 |

== Personnel ==
- Rod Argent - piano
- Evan Carter - painting photography
- Paul Chastain - 12-string electric guitar, electric guitar, rhythm guitar
- Gary Louris - electric guitar, backing vocals
- Sean Magee - mastering
- Valentine McCalumn - baritone, Dobro, electric slide guitar, guitar, electric guitar, steel guitar, mandolin, slide guitar, wah wah guitar
- Ric Menck - drums
- Dan Miggler - art direction
- John Moremen - electric guitar, rhythm guitar
- Debbi Peterson - drums
- Matthew Sweet - bass, engineer, acoustic guitar, electric guitar, mandolin, Mellotron, mixing, organ, piano, primary artist, producer

== Chart performance ==
| Chart (2017) | Peak position |
|---|---|
| US Independent Albums (Billboard) | 26 |
