= Kimi Ga Suki =

Kimi Ga Suki * Raifu

Studio album by Matthew Sweet
- Released: April 22, 2003
- Recorded: January 2002
- Genre: Alternative rock
- Label: Cutting Edge; Glass Modern
- Producer: Matthew Sweet

Matthew Sweet chronology
To Understand: The Early Recordings of Matthew Sweet (2000)	Kimi Ga Suki * Raifu (2003)	Living Things (2004)

Professional ratings
Review scores
Source	Rating
AllMusic	4/5 stars
The Encyclopedia of Popular Music	4/5 stars
Pitchfork Media	7.3/10

Kimi Ga Suki * Raifu (Japanese: キミがスキ・ライフ, lit. "I Love You – Life") is an album by alternative rock musician Matthew Sweet. It was released on Cutting Edge in 2003.

== Release ==
Released in April 2003 as a "thank you" to Japanese fans, it received a United States release the following year. Sweet stated in the liner notes of the album (which is translated in Japan as: キミがスキ・ライフ) that he wrote the album in the course of one week in January 2002. The album marked a reunion of most of Sweet's Girlfriend-era bandmates. Sweet mixed, produced and engineered the album at his house. The album cover was designed by Japanese artist Yoshitomo Nara. Also in the liner notes, Sweet described the album's title as an attempt at reverse Engrish: "If I did it correctly, the title should seem a little strange or wrong, but still meaningful! The true definition is supposed to be a 'love you' life, one devoted to loving someone or something, even life itself!"

== Critical reception ==
The New Yorker wrote that "songs like 'Morning Song' and 'Wait' find Sweet revisiting the rootsier side of Girlfriend, particularly in the generous use of slide guitar, and 'Love Is Gone' distills his best instincts with a lovely melody and aching harmonies." No Depression wrote that the album "churns with immediacy, from power-pop gems 'Dead Smile' and 'The Ocean In-Between' to the dark, Cheap Trick-like 'Spiral' and the acoustic twelve-string jangler "Love Is Gone'." The Rough Guide to Rock called it "a little less polished, but certainly [not] lacking in the great tunes and hooks department." New York wrote that "it’s good to hear [Sweet] loosen up to the point where his perfectionism no longer suffocates his songs."

== Track listing ==
All songs written by Matthew Sweet.

1. "Dead Smile" - 3:00
2. "Morning Song" - 2:37
3. "The Ocean In-Between" - 2:48
4. "I Love You" - 4:38
5. "I Don't Want to Know" - 2:28
6. "Warning" - 2:54
7. "Spiral" - 1:50
8. "Love is Gone" - 3:27
9. "Hear This" - 3:22
10. "Wait" - 2:38
11. "Tonight We Ride" - 2:44
12. "Through Your Eyes" - 7:13

== Personnel ==
- Matthew Sweet – vocals, guitars, bass
- Greg Leisz – guitars (2–10, 12)
- Richard Lloyd – guitars (3–6, 9–11)
- Ric Menck – drums

Production

- Matthew Sweet – producer, recording, mixing, liner notes
- Haruka Tsukamoto – design
- Yoshitomo Nara – sleeve artwork
- Jiro Oshima – Moji artwork
