= Sunshine Lies =

Studio album by Matthew Sweet
- Released: August 26, 2008
- Studios: Lolina Green Studios (Los Angeles, California)
- Genre: Alternative rock
- Label: Shout! Factory
- Producer: Matthew Sweet

Matthew Sweet chronology
The Pillowcase EP (2006)	Sunshine Lies (2008)	Under the Covers, Vol. 2 (2009)

Professional ratings
Review scores
Source	Rating
Allmusic	3.5/5 stars
Honest Tune Online	unfavorable
Paste	favorable
Pitchfork Media	(5.5/10)

Sunshine Lies is the tenth studio album by the alternative rock musician Matthew Sweet. It was released by Shout! Factory in 2008.

== Recording ==
Several of Sweet's regular collaborators play on the album, including Ric Menck (drums), Ivan Julian (guitar), Greg Leisz (guitar / pedal steel guitar) and Richard Lloyd (guitar). Susanna Hoffs and Lisa Sweet (Sweet's wife) provide backing vocals on the title track. The album was recorded and mixed by Sweet.

Previews of the album had been available on Sweet's MySpace page with the title "Rock Bottom", although Sweet has said that the preview was put there by his manager and that he never had any intention of releasing the album with that title.

== Release ==
The album had little commercial success, but favorable reviews. The review aggregating website Metacritic reports a normalized score of 71% based on 13 reviews. Sunshine Lies was released on CD, download and 2-LP vinyl. The vinyl set has four bonus tracks, while the iTunes download version has six bonus tracks (four of which also appear on the vinyl version).

== Track listing ==
All tracks are written by Matthew Sweet.

No.	Title	Length
1.	"Time Machine"	3:40
2.	"Room to Rock"	3:42
3.	"Byrdgirl"	3:18
4.	"Flying"	4:22
5.	"Feel Fear"	3:44
6.	"Let's Love"	3:57
7.	"Sunshine Lies"	3:21
8.	"Pleasure Is Mine"	4:48
9.	"Daisychain"	3:14
10.	"Sunrise Eyes"	4:22
11.	"Around You Now"	4:04
12.	"Burn Through Love"	3:08
13.	"Back of My Mind"	5:07

Vinyl bonus tracks
No.	Title	Length
14.	"Dark Blue"	4:02
15.	"Badass"	3:15
16.	"Could You Need Me?"	2:31
17.	"When You're Gone"	3:27

iTunes Deluxe Edition
No.	Title	Length
14.	"Badass"	3:15
15.	"Stick It" (iTunes exclusive)	2:52
16.	"Meltdown" (iTunes exclusive)	4:02
17.	"When You're Gone"	3:27
18.	"Could You Need Me?"	2:31
19.	"Dark Blue"	4:02

== Personnel ==
- Matthew Sweet – vocals, bass, Mellotron (1), sound effects (1), guitars (1–13, 15–17), acoustic piano (2, 5, 11), electric piano (3, 8, 12), organ (7, 8, 14), acoustic guitar (9, 14), 12-string guitar (9), electric guitar (14)
- Greg Leisz – lead guitar (1, 3), arpeggio guitar (5), octave guitar (6), pedal steel guitar (6), electric 12-string guitar (11), lead slide guitar (12), mandolin (13)
- Ivan Julian – lead guitar (2, 4, 10, 15–17), acoustic guitar (2, 10, 17), feedback sounds (4)
- Richard Lloyd – lead guitar (4, 13)
- Ric Menck – drums
- Susanna Hoffs – backing vocals (7)
- Lisa Sweet – backing vocals (7)

=== Production ===
- Shawn Amos – A&R
- Matthew Sweet – producer, recording, mixing, art direction
- Colin Leonard – vinyl mastering at Glenn Schick Mastering (Atlanta, Georgia)
- Glenn Schick – mastering at Glenn Schick Mastering (Atlanta, Georgia)
- Robert Kim – project supervision
- Jeff Palo – project supervision
- Dorothy Stefanski – project supervision
- TJ River – art direction
- Bahia Lahoud – design
- Karrie Stoufer – artwork, package supervision
- Brian Valentine – photography
- Russell Carter Artist Management Ltd. – management
