= Modern Art (Matthew Sweet album) =

Studio album by Matthew Sweet
- Released: September 27, 2011
- Recorded: April 2010 at Lolina Green Studios, Los Angeles
- Genre: Alternative rock
- Length: 42:07
- Label: Missing Piece
- Producer: Matthew Sweet

Matthew Sweet chronology
Under the Covers, Vol. 2 (2009)	Modern Art (2011)	Under the Covers, Vol. 3 (2013)

Professional ratings
Review scores
Source	Rating
Allmusic	3.5/5 stars

Modern Art is the eleventh studio album by alternative rock musician Matthew Sweet. It was released on Missing Piece Records in 2011.

== Release ==
The album, available as a CD, 2-LP vinyl set, and digital download, was met with little commercial success, but with favorable reviews. Amazon.com wrote, "Defiantly unorthodox, but often playfully so, Modern Art features 12 new compositions of Sweet's trademark wistful, yearning pop that recall some of Sweet s touchstones: the Beatles, Beach Boys and Big Star", and even notes the work of Sweet's side-players: "Longtime musical cohort Ric Menck (Velvet Crush) does all the drumming on the album (except for "Ivory Tower", which is built on a random drum pattern supplied by Sweet's friend, actor/musician Fred Armisen). Dennis Taylor's deft and urgent guitar lines serve as a running commentary to Sweet's introspective singing. Finished by mastering engineer Glenn Schick, Modern Art promises to be another trend-setting release by Sweet."

== Track listing ==
All tracks are written by Matthew Sweet.

No.	Title	Length
1.	"Oh, Oldendaze!"	4:28
2.	"Ivory Tower"	2:30
3.	"She Walks the Night"	5:00
4.	"When Love Lets Go I'm Falling"	3:20
5.	"Ladyfingers"	3:13
6.	"A Little Death"	3:24
7.	"Late Nights with the Power Pop"	3:30
8.	"Baltimore"	2:52
9.	"My Ass Is Grass"	2:32
10.	"December Dark"	3:20
11.	"Modern Art"	4:28
12.	"Sleeping"	3:30

LP bonus tracks
No.	Title	Length
13.	"At the Screen (with the World Flowing In)"	5:28

Special edition bonus tracks
No.	Title	Length
13.	"To Be Continued"	3:34
14.	"Blue in Tangerine"	3:24
15.	"Open Heart"	3:40

Amazon bonus track
No.	Title	Length
13.	"Nowhere"	4:00

iTunes bonus track
No.	Title	Length
13.	"Another Chance"	3:33

Digital download version available with purchase of LP
No.	Title	Length
13.	"Another Chance"	3:33
14.	"Evil by Design, Goodbye Nature"	2:59
15.	"At the Screen (with the World Flowing In)"	5:28
16.	"Nowhere"	4:00

== Personnel ==
- Matthew Sweet – vocals, pianos, Mellotron, organ, guitars, bass, percussion
- Dennis Taylor – lead guitars
- Ric Menck – drums, percussion
- Fred Armisen – drums (2)

=== Production ===
- Matthew Sweet – producer, recording, mixing
- Glenn Schick – mastering at Glenn Schick Mastering (Atlanta, Georgia)
- Alex Viau – graphic design
- Russell Carter Artist Management Ltd. – management
