= To Understand: The Early Recordings of Matthew Sweet =

Compilation album by Matthew Sweet
- Released: October 1, 2002
- Genre: Alternative rock
- Label: Hip-O Records

Matthew Sweet chronology
Time Capsule: Best of 90/00 (2000)	To Understand: The Early Recordings of Matthew Sweet (2002)	Kimi Ga Suki (2003)

Professional ratings
Review scores
Source	Rating
AllMusic	4/5 stars
Rolling Stone	2/5 stars

To Understand: The Early Recordings of Matthew Sweet is a compilation album by the alternative rock musician Matthew Sweet, released by Hip-O Records in 2002.

== Track listing ==
1. "Southern" (The Buzz of Delight)
2. "Christmas" (The Buzz of Delight)
3. "Briar Rose" (The Buzz of Delight)
4. "The Story of Love" (The Buzz of Delight)
5. "Ninety-Six Sheets" (The Buzz of Delight)
6. "Quiet Her"
7. "Blue Fools"
8. "We Lose Another Day"
9. "Save Time for Me"
10. "Something Becomes Nothing" (The Golden Palominos)
11. "Easy"
12. "When I Feel Again" (Single Remix)
13. "Wind and the Sun"
14. "Love"
15. "Vertigo"
16. "Having a Bad Dream"
17. "To Understand" (12 Inch B-Side/Demo)
18. "You Gotta Love Me" (12 Inch B-Side/Demo)
19. "Silent City" (12 Inch B-Side/Demo)
20. "Divine Intervention" (12 Inch B-Side/Demo)
21. "Good Friend" (Demo)
22. "Tainted Obligation" (Demo) (Community Trolls)
