= Under the Covers, Vol. 2 =

Under the Covers Vol. 2

Studio album by Matthew Sweet and Susanna Hoffs
- Released: July 21, 2009
- Studio: Lolina Green (Los Angeles, California); Liscombe Park Studios (Bedfordshire, UK)
- Genre: Rock
- Length: 64:00
- Label: Shout! Factory
- Producer: Matthew Sweet, Susanna Hoffs

Matthew Sweet chronology
Sunshine Lies (2008)	Under the Covers Vol. 2 (2009)	Modern Art (2011)

Susanna Hoffs chronology
Under the Covers, Vol. 1 (2006)	Under the Covers Vol. 2 (2009)	Someday (2012)

Professional ratings
Review scores
Source	Rating
Allmusic	3/5 stars
PopMatters	6/10 stars

Under the Covers Vol. 2 is the second collaboration between alternative rock artist Matthew Sweet and Bangles singer/guitarist Susanna Hoffs. Released by Shout! Factory on July 21, 2009, it contains 16 cover versions of songs from the 1970s.

The iTunes deluxe edition adds a further ten tracks. The 2015 boxset Completely Under the Covers collects all three volumes of the series, including the iTunes deluxe tracks, with a whole extra CD given over to the Vol. 2 bonus tracks.

== Track listing ==
#	Title	Original artist	Length
1.	"Sugar Magnolia"	Grateful Dead	3:32
2.	"Go All the Way"	Raspberries	3:33
3.	"Second Hand News"	Fleetwood Mac	3:13
4.	"Bell Bottom Blues"	Derek and the Dominos	5:02
5.	"All the Young Dudes"	Mott the Hoople	3:52
6.	"You're So Vain"	Carly Simon	4:22
7.	"Here Comes My Girl"	Tom Petty and the Heartbreakers	4:22
8.	"I've Seen All Good People"	Yes	7:29
9.	"Hello It's Me"	Todd Rundgren	3:51
10.	"Willin'"	Little Feat	2:59
11.	"Back of a Car"	Big Star	2:32
12.	"Couldn't I Just Tell You"	Todd Rundgren	3:27
13.	"Gimme Some Truth"	John Lennon	3:27
14.	"Maggie May"	Rod Stewart	5:32
15.	"Everything I Own"	Bread	3:09
16.	"Beware of Darkness"	George Harrison	3:38

== Bonus Tracks on iTunes Deluxe Version ==
#	Title	Original artist	Length
17.	"Dreaming"	Blondie	2:51
18.	"Marquee Moon"	Television	10:49
19.	"I Wanna Be Sedated"	Ramones	2:10
20.	"Baby Blue"	Badfinger	3:42
21.	"You Say You Don't Love Me"	Buzzcocks	2:55
22.	"(What's So Funny 'Bout) Peace, Love, and Understanding"	Brinsley Schwarz	3:57
23.	"You Can Close Your Eyes"	James Taylor	2:34
24.	"Melissa"	The Allman Brothers Band	4:14
25.	"Killer Queen"	Queen	2:56
26.	"A Song For You"	Gram Parsons	2:59

== Personnel ==
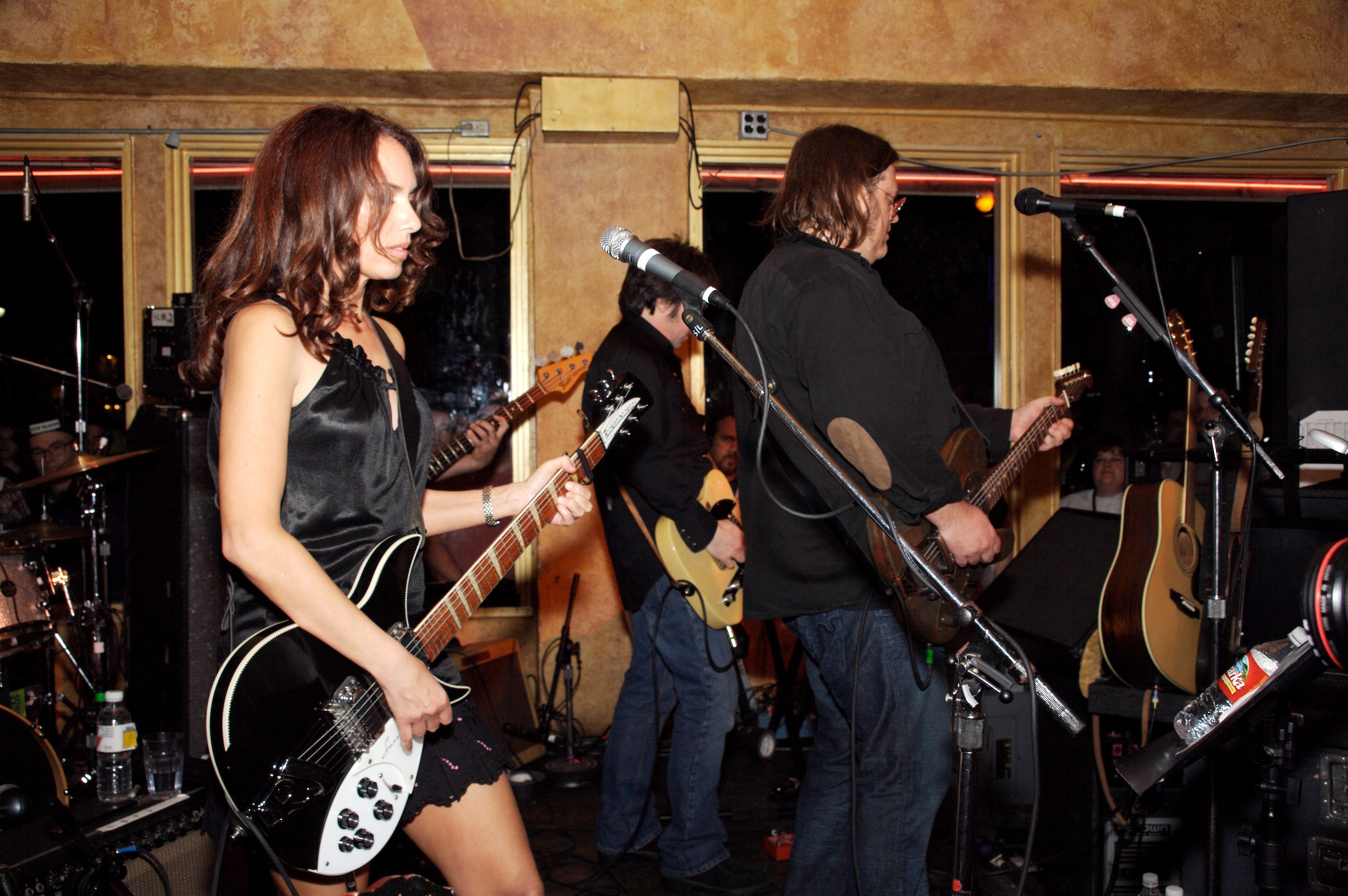
Susanna Hoffs and Matthew Sweet at SXSW 2006 in Austin, Texas.

- Matthew Sweet – vocals, bass, guitars (1, 2, 4, 6–8), acoustic guitars (3, 5, 10, 12–15), electric 12-string octave guitar (3), ukulele (3), acoustic piano (4, 5, 7–9, 16), organ (4, 5, 7–9, 16), tabla (4), electric guitars (5, 10–13, 15, 16), percussion (6–8), Mellotron (8), electric harpsichord (15)
- Susanna Hoffs – vocals, percussion (1, 2, 4–16), guitars (3), handclaps (5)
- Natalie Byrd – acoustic piano (6)
- Greg Leisz – guitars (1, 6, 10), pedal steel guitar (1, 10, 15), mandolin (3, 14), lead guitar (4, 6, 9), rhythm guitars (9), slide guitar solo (13, 16), acoustic guitar (14), electric guitar solo (14), electric guitar (16), slide guitar (16)
- Lindsey Buckingham – lead guitar (3), guitars (3)
- Peter Phillips – lead guitar (5), guitars (5)
- Steve Howe – electric lead guitar (8), Portuguese 12-string acoustic guitar (8)
- Dhani Harrison – acoustic guitar (16), electric guitar (16)
- Ric Menck – drums
- Evan Peters – handclaps (5)

=== Production ===
- Derek Dressler – A&R
- Susanna Hoffs – producer
- Matthew Sweet – producer, recording, mixing
- Evan Peters – additional engineer
- Steve Rispin – additional engineer for Steve Howe (8)
- Glenn Schick – mastering at Glenn Schick Mastering (Atlanta, Georgia)
- Dorothy Stefansky – editing supervisor
- Robert Kim – project supervisor
- Karrie Stoufer – artwork, artwork and package supervisor
- Todd Gallapo – package design
- Danielle Marquez – package design
- George McWilliams – package design
- Ed Fotheringham – illustrations
- Drew Reynolds – photography
- Anthony Chiapetta – photography assistant
- Russell Carter Artist Management Ltd. – management

== Charts ==
Chart performance for Under the Covers, Vol. 2
Chart (2009)	Peak position
UK Independent Albums (OCC)	45
US Billboard 200	106
