= Under the Covers, Vol. 3 =

Studio album by Matthew Sweet and Susanna Hoffs
- Released: November 12, 2013
- Recorded: Lolina Green (Matthew Sweet's home studio)
- Genre: Rock
- Label: Shout! Factory
- Producers: Matthew Sweet, Susanna Hoffs

Matthew Sweet chronology
Modern Art (2011)	Under the Covers, Vol. 3 (2013)	Tomorrow Forever (2017)

Susanna Hoffs chronology
Someday (2012)	Under the Covers, Vol. 3 (2013)	Bright Lights (2021)

Professional ratings
Review scores
Source	Rating
Allmusic	3.5/5 stars

Under the Covers, Vol. 3 is the third and final collaboration between alternative rock artist Matthew Sweet and Bangles singer/guitarist Susanna Hoffs. Released by Shout! Factory on November 12, 2013, it contains 14 cover versions of songs from the 1980s. The 2015 boxset Completely Under the Covers collects all three volumes, including the bonus tracks previously only available on the iTunes deluxe editions.

== Track listing ==
#	Title	Original artist	Length
1.	"Sitting Still"	R.E.M.	3:18
2.	"Girls Talk"	Elvis Costello	3:32
3.	"Big Brown Eyes"	The dB's	1:54
4.	"Kid"	The Pretenders	3:03
5.	"Free Fallin'"	Tom Petty	4:18
6.	"Save It for Later"	The English Beat	3:27
7.	"They Don't Know"	Kirsty MacColl	3:02
8.	"The Bulrushes"	The Bongos	2:44
9.	"Our Lips Are Sealed"	The Go-Go's	2:54
10.	"How Soon Is Now"	The Smiths	5:45
11.	"More Than This"	Roxy Music	4:08
12.	"Towers of London"	XTC	4:55
13.	"Killing Moon"	Echo & the Bunnymen	4:23
14.	"Trouble"	Lindsey Buckingham	3:45

== Bonus Tracks on iTunes Deluxe Version ==
#	Title	Original artist	Length
15.	"Train in Vain"	The Clash	2:59
16.	"You're My Favorite Waste of Time"	Marshall Crenshaw	2:28
17.	"I Would Die 4 U"	Prince	2:52

== Personnel ==
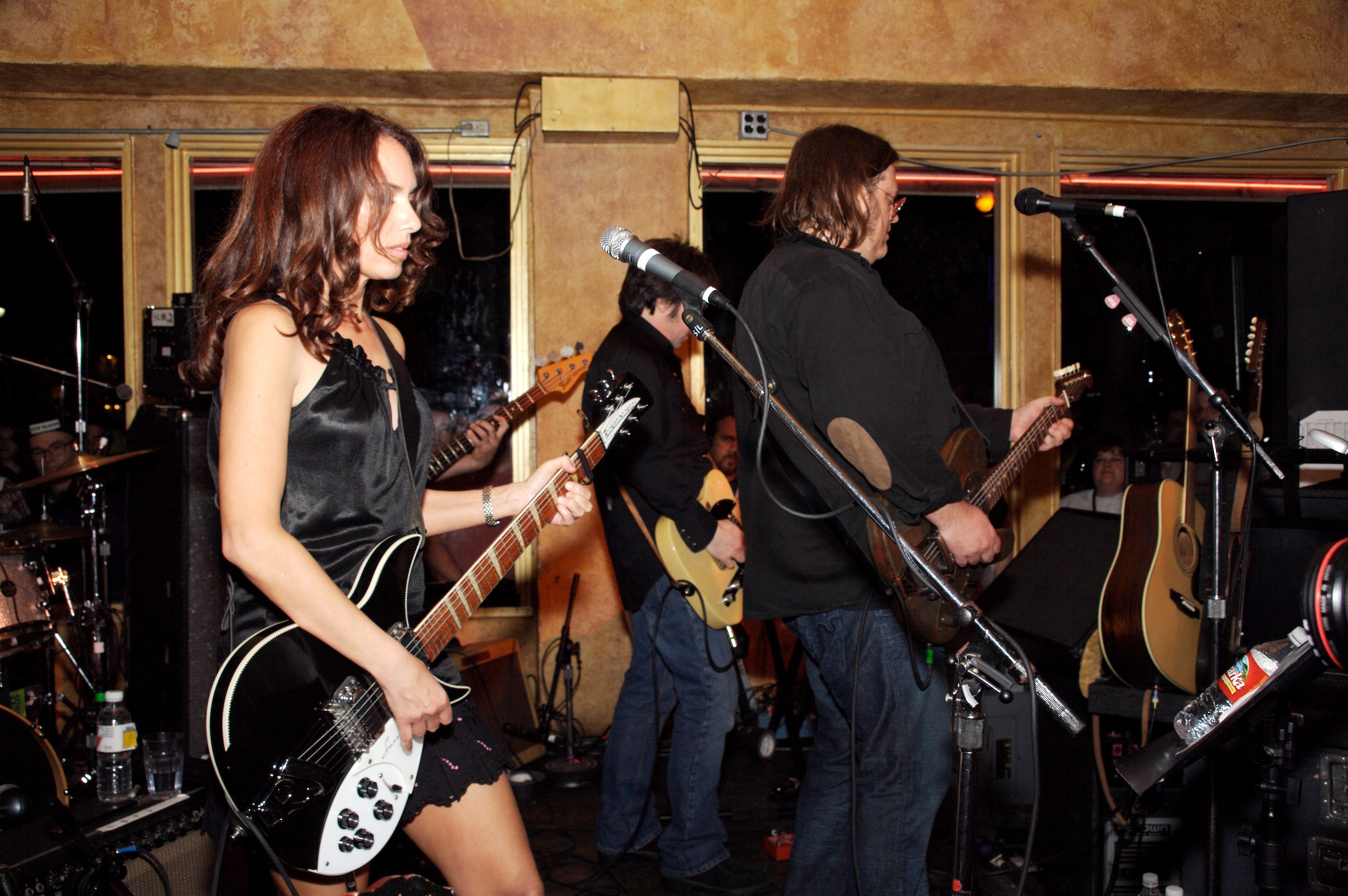
Susanna Hoffs and Matthew Sweet at SXSW 2006 in Austin, Texas.

- Matthew Sweet – vocals, guitars (1, 2, 5, 13, 14), bass (1, 2, 5, 7, 9, 13, 14), keyboards (2, 6, 7, 9, 11–13), percussion (6, 12, 14)
- Susanna Hoffs – vocals, percussion (2, 5–7, 9)
- Dennis Taylor – guitars, bass (1–4, 6, 8, 10–13)
- Andrew Brassell – guitars (2, 7), keyboards (7)
- Ric Menck – drums

=== Production ===
- Derek Dressler – A&R
- Susanna Hoffs – producer
- Matthew Sweet – producer, recording, mixing, mastering
- Andrew Brassell – additional recording
- Robb McCaffrie – editing supervisor
- Emily Sage – A&R coordination
- Karen Hartland – artwork and packaging supervisor
- SMAY Design – package design
- Ed Fotheringham – illustrations
- Drew Reynolds – photography
- Russell Carter Artist Management Ltd. – management
