= The Buzz of Delight =

American band

The Buzz of Delight was an American band consisting of Matthew Sweet and David Pierce, which was active from 1983 to 1985.

== Background ==
Matthew Sweet grew up in Lincoln, Nebraska. He was musical from an early age, and as a teenager made 4-track cassettes of songs he wrote. Sweet was an early fan of R.E.M., as well as their first producer, Mitch Easter. He had R.E.M.'s first single, "Radio Free Europe", and loved its B-side, "Sitting Still". He met the band when they played a small concert in Lincoln in September 1982, when he was still in high school. He gave a cassette of songs he had been working on to R.E.M.'s Michael Stipe. R.E.M. put Sweet in touch with Easter, and the two became pen pals. Stipe, as well as his sister Lynda Stipe and friend Linda Hopper — who were both in the band Oh-OK — all liked Sweet's cassette of songs, and the three of them sent him postcards suggesting that he come to perform in the town where they lived, Athens, Georgia. Athens was famous for its flourishing music scene, which Sweet had read about in New York Rocker magazine. Easter also recommended that Sweet move to Athens, which he did after graduating from high school. Soon after he arrived, he became a member of Oh-OK, and he played on their E.P. Furthermore What. After its release, the band's drummer, David Pierce, was fired from the band. While still a member of Oh-Ok, Sweet formed a new band with Pierce, called the Buzz of Delight.

== Name ==
The band's name came from a conversation between Linda Hopper and Michael Stipe; in her kitchen in Athens, she told Stipe that "the buzz of the lights was freaking [her] out", to which he replied, "The buzz of delight?"

== Discography ==
- "Christmas" (single) – 1983
- Sound Castles EP – 1984

"Southern"
"Miracle"
"In Summer"
"Happy Town"
"Christmas"
"And..."

- Squares Blot Out the Sun – 1990

"I've Got Gold"

- "Just Can't Get Enough: New Wave Christmas" – 1996

"Christmas"

- To Understand – The Early Recordings of Matthew Sweet – 2002

"Southern"
"Christmas"
"Briar Rose"
"The Story of Love"
"Ninety-Six Sheets"
