= Matthew Sweet =

American musician (born 1964)

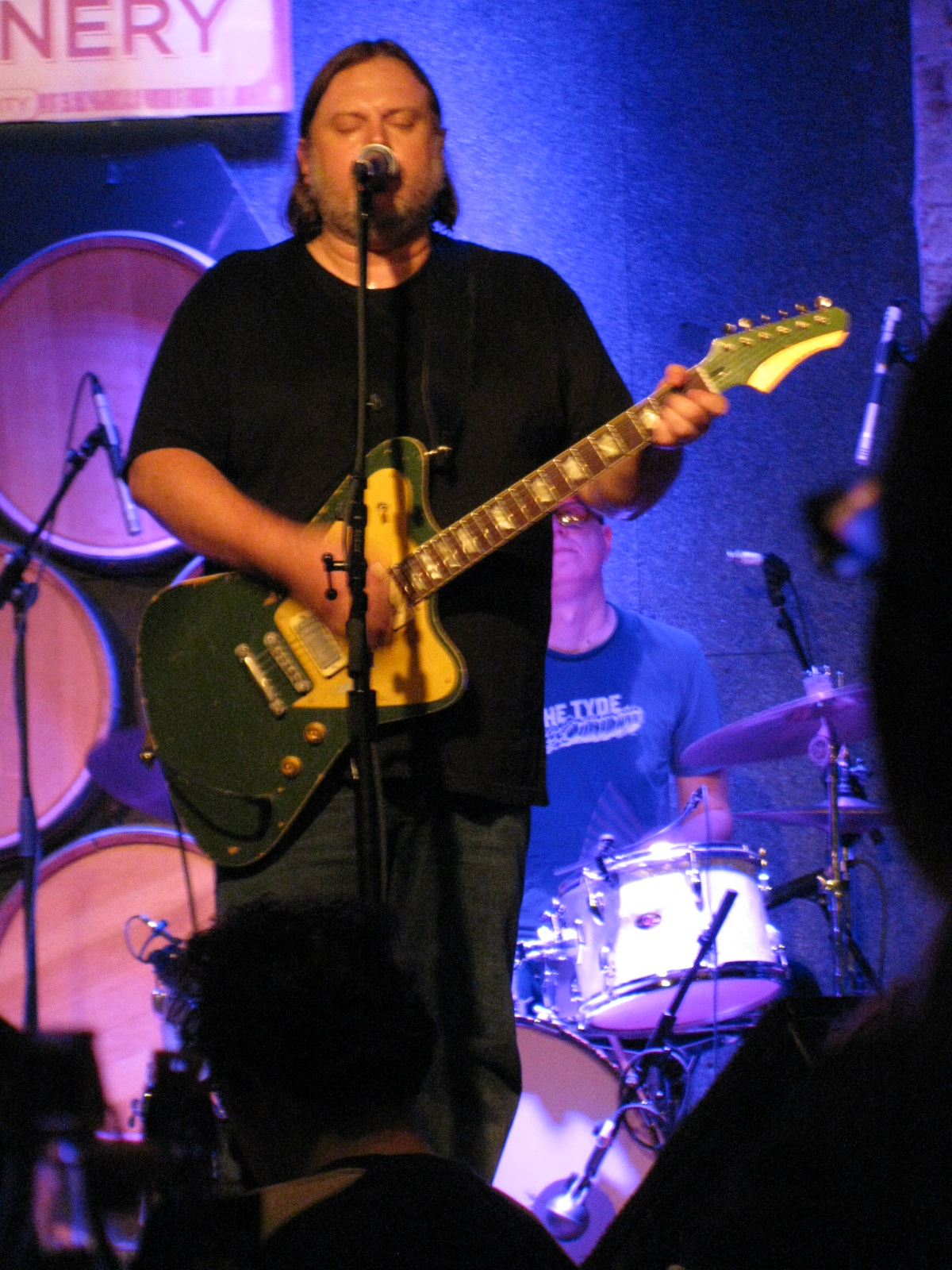
- Sweet performing in 2011

Background information
- Born: Sidney Matthew Sweet; October 6, 1964 (age 62); Lincoln, Nebraska, U.S.
- Genres: Alternative rock; power pop
- Occupations: Singer, musician, songwriter, record producer
- Instruments: Vocals, guitar, bass
- Years active: 1978–present
- Labels: Columbia; A&M; Zoo Entertainment; Shout! Factory
- Formerly of: The Specs; Oh-OK; Community Trolls; The Buzz of Delight; Ming Tea (non-virtual); The Thorns
- Website: matthewsweet.com

Sidney Matthew Sweet (born October 6, 1964) is an American alternative rock/power pop singer-songwriter and musician who was part of the burgeoning music scene in Athens, Georgia, during the 1980s before gaining commercial success in the 1990s as a solo artist. His 1991 album Girlfriend was certified gold by the RIAA. His companion albums, Tomorrow Forever and Tomorrow's Daughter, were followed by 2018's Wicked System of Things and 2021's Catspaw, his 15th studio effort.

== Early life and education ==
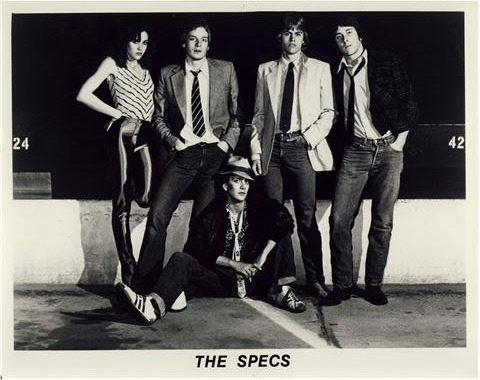
Sweet (middle) with his first band the Specs, c. late 1970s

Sweet was born in Lincoln, Nebraska. He graduated from Southeast High School in Lincoln, in 1983. Upon graduation he moved to Athens, Georgia, to attend college, on the recommendation of Mitch Easter. Sweet and Easter had become pen pals after R.E.M.'s Bill Berry suggested Easter bring Sweet into his band Let's Active.

== Career ==
=== 1980s ===
As a high school student in 1980, Sweet wrote songs and recorded them on four-track cassettes. He joined the band The Specs and released his first recording on a battle of bands LP produced by a local radio station, and fronted his own local band called The Dialtones. After graduating, Sweet traveled to Athens, Georgia, to attend college amid the flourishing Athens music scene. That same year, Sweet, who had met the band R.E.M. when they played a show in his hometown the previous year, collaborated with frontman Michael Stipe in a duo group under the name Community Trolls, as well as played guitar in Stipe's sister Lynda Stipe's band, Oh-OK. In addition, he formed another duo, The Buzz of Delight, with Oh-OK drummer David Pierce, releasing an EP, Sound Castles, in 1984 on DB Records. On the strength of this 12" vinyl, Sweet was signed to a solo recording contract with Columbia Records.

In 1986, he released Inside, his debut album, to good reviews but little commercial success. In 1989, he released Earth after signing with A&M Records; likewise, it was well-received critically, yet not commercially.

=== 1990s ===
In 1990, A&M released Sweet from his contract, and he signed with rival Zoo Entertainment, which evolved into Volcano Entertainment. Sweet formed a new band (which included Richard Lloyd, Robert Quine, Greg Leisz, Lloyd Cole, and Fred Maher), and they spent that year assembling his next work, originally titled Nothing Lasts. Robert Quine and Richard Lloyd already participated in the recording of Earth (1989).

The following year, Sweet released Girlfriend, which was widely considered an artistic breakthrough. It quickly garnered impressive U.S. sales, spawning a Top 10 single with the title track. The music video for "Girlfriend" (heavily aired on MTV, MuchMusic and Night Tracks) featured clips from the anime film Space Adventure Cobra, while the video for "I've Been Waiting" used clips of the Urusei Yatsura character Lum.

In 1993, Sweet released Altered Beast, an album which drew mixed reactions with its intense and brooding tracks (such as "Someone to Pull the Trigger" and "Knowing People"). The music video for the single "The Ugly Truth" (directed by Sweet) featured the singer being chased in the desert by police while driving his own 1970 Dodge Challenger, while the video for "Time Capsule" was a literary homage to Jonathan Swift's Gulliver's Travels.

In 1995, Sweet released 100% Fun, an alt-rock album best known for its lead track, the self-deprecating "Sick of Myself". The album itself fared better commercially, and even made it onto Entertainment Weekly critic David Browne's year's-best list.

In 1997, Sweet released Blue Sky on Mars, a new-wave album which featured the synth-laden singles "Where You Get Love" and "Come to California". The music video for the former featured Sweet as an astronaut traveling through outer space.

In 1998, his version of Walter Egan's "Magnet and Steel" was recorded on the Sabrina The Teenage Witch album with Lindsey Buckingham on guitar.

In 1999, Sweet released In Reverse, a psychedelic album which featured Wall of Sound singles "What Matters" and "Trade Places". The album is noteworthy for its 10-minute closing track, "Thunderstorm", a combination of several demos.

=== 2000s ===
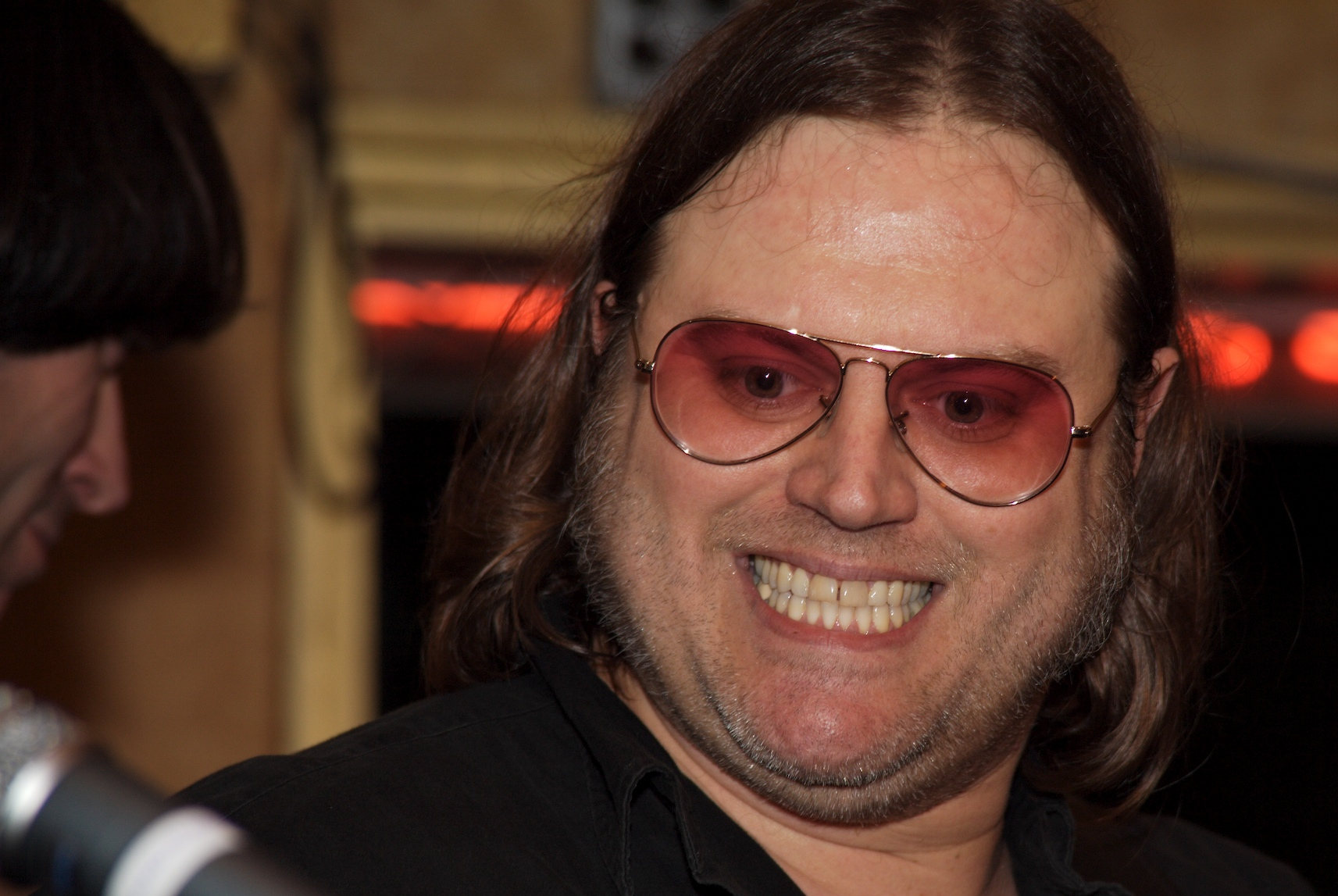
Sweet in 2006

In 2000, Sweet released Time Capsule: Best of 90/00, a retrospective compilation which featured two new tracks.

In 2001, Sweet and Darius Rucker performed The Beach Boys song "Sail On, Sailor" on the special A Tribute to Brian Wilson; the musicians later performed the same song with Brian Wilson on Late Show with David Letterman.

In 2002, Sweet released To Understand: The Early Recordings of Matthew Sweet, a retrospective compilation which featured unreleased material. Also that year, he formed the group The Thorns with Shawn Mullins and Pete Droge.

In 2003, Sweet released Kimi Ga Suki, a garage-rock album initially released in Japan, where Sweet has a following.

In 2004, he released Living Things, an acoustic album mainly consisted of material he wrote while recording with The Thorns.

In 2006, Sweet and Susanna Hoffs released Under the Covers, Vol. 1, which featured covers of popular 1960s songs.

In 2008, Sweet released Sunshine Lies, his 10th studio album, which also incorporated a 2-LP set featuring 4 bonus tracks.

In 2009, Sweet and Hoffs released Under the Covers, Vol. 2, which featured covers of popular 1970s songs.

=== 2010s ===
In 2010, the musical Girlfriend, using songs from Sweet's album of the same name, was staged by the Berkeley Repertory Theatre.

In 2011, Sweet released Modern Art, an album which featured the single "She Walks the Night".

In 2012, Sweet celebrated the 20th anniversary of Girlfriend with a tour performing the entire album. Also that year, Sweet contributed an essay for the Mark Dillon book Fifty Sides of the Beach Boys on the 1967 song "Wonderful".

In 2013, Sweet and Susanna Hoffs released Under the Covers, Vol. 3, which features covers of popular 1980s songs.

In 2014, Sweet was featured on The Simpsons, the longest-running American sitcom. He wrote "Hopin' for a Dream", a song by fictitious 1980s band SunGazer, in the episode. Sweet and his wife Lisa were also research consultants for the Tim Burton film Big Eyes, a biography on painter Margaret Keane.

In 2015, Sweet and Susanna Hoffs released Completely Under the Covers, a limited 4-disc box set of all three Under the Covers albums, with 15 bonus tracks.

In 2017, Sweet released Tomorrow Forever, a rootsy album funded entirely by fans on Kickstarter; over the course of one month in 2014, the project exceeded its $32,000 goal by 75% from fewer than 800 backers.

In 2018, Sweet released Tomorrow's Daughter on May 18, a companion album to Tomorrow Forever. Also that year, Sweet was paid tribute in the compilation album Altered Sweet, which included artists such as Lisa Mychols, Andy Reed, Greg Pope, Nick Bertling, Fireking, Chris Richards & The Subtractions, simple friend, Michael Simmons, Gretchen's Wheel, The Well Wishers, Elvyn, Pop Co-Op, Stabby Robot, Lannie Flowers, Stereo Tiger, Michael Carpenter, Phil Ajjarapu, CokeRoque, Donny Brown, Nick Piunti, Paranoid Lovesick, Trolley, Keith Klingensmith, Arvidson & Butterflies, Robyn Gibson and Popdudes. Also that year, independent vinyl reissue label Intervention Records announced it would release Artist-Approved 2 LP Expanded Editions of 100% Fun, Altered Beast, and Girlfriend on vinyl and CD/SACD, along with a vinyl reissue of Son of Altered Beast. On Record Store Day's Black Friday, he released Wicked System of Things, a tribute to midwestern power pop, and a 3-inch colored vinyl of a live 1997 recording from Disney Orlando's Pleasure Island for Record Store Day in 2019.

=== 2020s ===
In 2021, Sweet released Catspaw, his 15th studio album, and the first to feature Sweet playing all lead guitar parts. At the time of his stroke in 2024, Sweet was writing and recording new material for an upcoming album, Midsommar. Due to the effects of his illness it is unlikely to be finished in the immediate future, according to Sweet.

== Personal life ==
Sweet and his wife Lisa have resided in Omaha, Nebraska, since 2013. He was married at least once before; a 1989 divorce inspired the songs on Sweet's commercial breakthrough album Girlfriend.

Sweet is a member of the Canadian charity Artists Against Racism.

In October 2024, Sweet suffered a debilitating stroke while on tour with Hanson. The stroke was severe and left him unable to walk due to ataxia (extreme dizziness); disabled proper use of his left arm, which keeps him from being able to play guitar; and affected his speech. He is undergoing therapy to mitigate the effects of the stroke.

== Discography ==
- Inside (1986)
- Earth (1989)
- Girlfriend (1991)
- Altered Beast (1993)
- 100% Fun (1995)
- Blue Sky on Mars (1997)
- In Reverse (1999)
- Kimi Ga Suki (2003)
- Living Things (2004)
- Under the Covers, Vol. 1 (with Susanna Hoffs) (2006)
- Sunshine Lies (2008)
- Under the Covers, Vol. 2 (with Susanna Hoffs) (2009)
- Modern Art (2011)
- Under the Covers, Vol. 3 (with Susanna Hoffs) (2013)
- Tomorrow Forever (2017)
- Tomorrow's Daughter (2018)
- Wicked System of Things (2018)
- Catspaw (2021)

== Film and television ==
1992	"Silent City", Buffy the Vampire Slayer
1993	"Girlfriend", Baywatch
1994	"Superdeformed", Beavis and Butthead
1995	"Ultrasuede", National Lampoon's Senior Trip; "My Pet", Ace Ventura: When Nature Calls; "Everything Changes", The Babysitters Club; "Urges", Space Ghost Coast to Coast
1996	"Flipper", Flipper; "Happiness", Kids in the Hall: Brain Candy; "Dark Secret", The Craft; "Swan Song", Bed of Roses
1997	"Hollow", The Game; "BBC" (with Mike Myers), Austin Powers: International Man of Mystery
1998	"Farther Down", Can't Hardly Wait; "Magnet & Steel" (Walter Egan cover), Sabrina the Teenage Witch; "Magnet & Steel" (Walter Egan cover), Overnight Delivery; "Sick of Myself", I Think I Do
1999	"Faith in You", Drive Me Crazy
2000	"Faith in You", Roswell
2001	"I've Been Waiting", All Over the Guy
2002	"It Don't Matter to Me", Ash Wednesday; "Girlfriend", Crossroads
2003	"Daddy Wasn't There" (with Mike Myers), Austin Powers in Goldmember; "Warmth of the Sun" (Beach Boys cover), American Dreams; "I've Been Waiting", Scrubs
2004	"Cats Vs Dogs", Garfield: The Movie; "Blue" (Jayhawks cover), Win a Date with Tad Hamilton!; "No Blue Sky", Smallville
2005	Theme song, Camp Burlesque
2006	"Girlfriend", Guitar Hero II (game); "The Tide Is High", How to Eat Fried Worms; "Livin' Thing", My Name Is Earl
2007	"Come to California", Nancy Drew; "Different Drum" (Michael Nesmith cover), The Heartbreak Kid
2009	"Got to Get You into My Life" (Beatles cover), Imagine That; "Ghosts of Girlfriends Past" (w/ All Too Much), Ghosts of Girlfriends Past
2010	"Wild", The Bigtop; Theme song, Scooby-Doo! Mystery Incorporated
2012	"Girlfriend", Chasing Mavericks
2014	"Hopin' For a Dream", The Simpsons; "Girlfriend", One Hit Wonderland
2016	"Save Time for Me", Documentary Now!
2018	"Penny's Deep Sea Dive", Top Wing
2019	"Girlfriend", Wonder Park

== Tributes and benefits ==
1993	"Superdeformed", No Alternative; "She Said She Said" (Beatles cover), Born to Choose; "This Moment", Sweet Relief: A Benefit for Victoria Williams
1994	"Let Me Be The One", If I Were A Carpenter; "Bovine Connection", Yellow Pills, Vol. 2: More of the Best of American Pop
1995	"Scooby-Doo, Where Are You?", Saturday Morning: Cartoons' Greatest Hits
1996	"A Day in the Life of a Tree" (Beach Boys cover), Honor: A Benefit for the Honor the Earth Campaign; "Dragon Lady", A Small Circle of Friends: Germs (Tribute)
1997	"Do Ya" (Move cover), Live from 6A: Great Musical Performances from Late Night with Conan O'Brien
1998	"Girlfriend", Onxrt: Live From the Archives, Vol. 4; "We're the Same", Golden Jam: General Mills' Golden Grahams
1999	"Divine Intervention", 2 Meter Sessies, Vol. 5
2001	"Every Night", Listen to What the Man Said: Popular Artists Pay Tribute to Paul McCartney.
2002	"Karen", Shoe Fetish: A Tribute to Shoes.; "Big Sky", This Is Where I Belong – The Songs of Ray Davies & The Kinks; "Halfway to Paradise" (Gerry Goffin & Carole King song recorded by Nick Lowe), The Stiff Generation – If It Ain't Stiff It Ain't Worth A Tribute
2004	"Good Night" (Beatles cover), For the Kids Too
2005	"American Girl" (Tom Petty cover), High School Reunion: A Tribute To Those Great 80s Films
2006	"The Ballad of El Goodo", Big Star, Small World; "Good Day Sunshine" (vocals w/ The Bangles), All Together Now: Beatles Stuff for Kids of All Ages
2007	"Everybody Knows This Is Nowhere" (w/ Susanna Hoffs), Like a Hurricane: A Tribute to Neil Young
2012	"Hombre Secreto (Secret Agent Man)" (Plugz cover), A Tribute to Repo Man
2013	"Marianne" (vocals w/ Tim Robbins), Son of Rogue's Gallery: Pirate Ballads, Sea Songs and Chanteys; "Second Choice" (vocals w/ Velvet Crush), Skrang: Sounds Like Bobby Sutliff
2017	"Lonely Summer" (original), Taking It To Heart: Volume Two

== Other appearances ==
- In 1983, Sweet was an extra in the film Terms of Endearment, in a scene featuring Debra Winger and Jeff Daniels at the University of Nebraska–Lincoln.
- In 1985, Sweet contributed a cover of the dB's "Ask for Jill" (with Don Dixon and Chris Stamey) for the Hoboken anthology Luxury Condos Coming to Your Neighborhood Soon.
- In 1986, Sweet contributed lyrics and vocals to the song "Something Becomes Nothing" for The Golden Palominos album Blast of Silence and played with the band during a 1987 concert tour.
- In 1988, Sweet co-wrote (with Jules Shear) the title track to the final 'Til Tuesday album, Everything's Different Now.
- In 1990, Sweet contributed bass, guitar and vocals to several tracks on Lloyd Cole's album Lloyd Cole (also known as The X Album).
- In 1991, Sweet contributed bass guitar to Lloyd Cole's cover of "Chelsea Hotel" for the tribute album I'm Your Fan: The Songs of Leonard Cohen, and toured with his band, Lloyd Cole and the Commotions.
- In 1991, Sweet recorded and co-produced Velvet Crush's debut album, In the Presence of Greatness.
- In 1992, Sweet was featured on an episode of the series 120 Minutes, hosted by VJ Dave Kendall, which included an interview and live performance.
- In 1992, Sweet played bass on the album To Hell With Love by Suzanne Rhatigan, which was produced by Sweet's Girlfriend producer Fred Maher and also featured Sweet's guitarist Robert Quine.
- In 1995, Sweet appeared on an episode of the series Space Ghost Coast to Coast. That same year, he was featured on an episode of VH1 Duets with John Hiatt, and contributed guitar and vocals to the song "She's Not in Love", on the Kim Stockwood album Bonavista.
- In 1996, Sweet contributed bass guitar to the song "Are You Ready for the Fallout?" on the Fastball debut album. Also, Sweet provided backing vocals for Kris McKay in a cover of his own song, "How Cool", on her album Things That Show.
- In 1997, Sweet was the subject of Matthew Sweet: On the Edge, a documentary produced by NPTV (Nebraska Public Television). Also that year, Sweet contributed vocals to the song "Sixteen Down" on the Jayhawks album Sound of Lies.
- Also in 1997, Sweet appeared in Austin Powers: International Man of Mystery. He played a performer in Austin's band Ming Tea playing during the closing credits of the movie.
- In 1998, Sweet appeared on an episode of the series The Drew Carey Show as a musician auditioning to be in Carey's band.
- In 1999, Sweet co-produced (and co-wrote two songs) on the Velvet Crush album Free Expression.
- In 2000, Sweet contributed lyrics and vocals to the song "Daylight", on the Delerium album Poem. Also that year, he appeared on the game show Win Ben Stein's Money as a contestant playing for Alzheimer's.
- In 2001, Sweet was interviewed for the book Behind The Muse: Pop and Rock's Greatest Songwriters Talk About Their Work and Inspiration.
- In 2002, Sweet contributed vocals to the title track of the Counting Crows album Hard Candy.
- In 2003, Sweet co-wrote the song "Stumbling Through the Dark" for the Jayhawks album Rainy Day Music.
- In 2004, Sweet co-wrote the title track to the Hanson album Underneath.
- In 2008, Sweet was featured in Mellodrama, a documentary about the Mellotron. Also, he produced The Bridges' debut album, Limits of the Sky.
- In 2010, Sweet was featured on an episode of Stripped Down Live With Curt Smith, which included an interview and live performance.
- In 2011, Sweet performed the Big Star song "September Gurls" with Mike Mills at a tribute concert to Alex Chilton. Also, he co-produced The Bangles' comeback album, Sweetheart of the Sun.
- In 2012, Sweet was the subject for an episode of On Canvas, an Emmy-winning music program which fuses stage performances with interviews.
- In 2013, Sweet performed the Beatles songs "Nowhere Man" and "Day Tripper" with the Wild Honey Orchestra (featuring Rusty Anderson) at a tribute benefit for autism. That same year, he contributed bass to the Lloyd Cole album Standards.
- In 2013, Sweet collaborated with Tim Robbins and Susanna Hoffs for a cover of the traditional "Marianne" for the sea shanty compilation Son of Rogues Gallery: Pirate Ballads, Sea Songs & Chanteys.
- In 2020, Sweet contributed guitar and backing vocals to a new version of Badfinger's "Baby Blue" for the band's sole surviving member, Joey Molland.
- In 2022, Sweet published an unreleased cover demo of Kate Bush's 1978 single "Wuthering Heights" on his YouTube channel.
