= Magnapop discography =

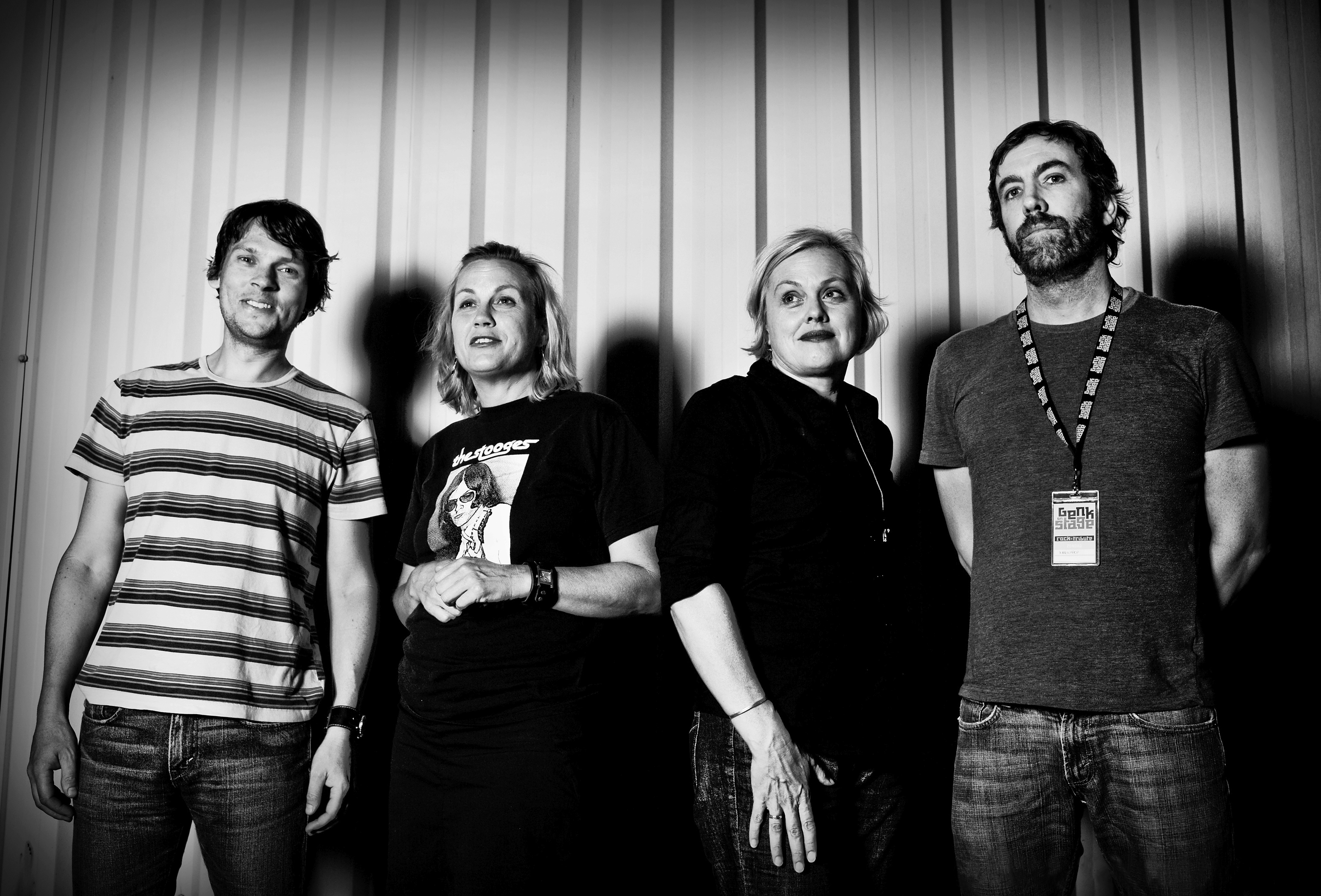
- Magnapop posing in 2010, from left to right: bassist Scott Rowe, guitarist and backing vocalist Ruthie Morris, singer Linda Hopper, and drummer Chad Williams
- Studio albums: 5
- Extended plays: 4
- Soundtrack albums: 3
- Live albums: 1
- Tribute albums: 4
- Singles: 6
- B-sides: 8
- Music videos: 5
- Various artist compilations: 33
- Radio sessions: 5

The discography of Magnapop—an American rock band from Atlanta, Georgia—consists of five studio albums, one live album, four extended plays, and six singles.

First forming in 1989 under the name Homemade Sister, the group is primarily composed of singer/songwriter Linda Hopper and guitarist/songwriter Ruthie Morris. The Homemade Sister line-up of the band only recorded a demo tape and the single "Rip the Wreck"/"Merry". Magnapop first achieved fame in the European festival circuit and had their biggest commercial success in the mid-1990s with the minor hits "Slowly, Slowly" and "Open the Door" from the albums Hot Boxing and Rubbing Doesn't Help, respectively.

== Albums ==
=== Studio albums ===
Year	Album details
1992	Magnapop: Released: October 16, 1992; Label: Caroline Records and Play It Again Sam Records/Priority Records
1994	Hot Boxing: Released: July 5, 1994; Label: Play It Again Sam Records/Priority Records
1996	Rubbing Doesn't Help: Released: May 21, 1996; Label: Play It Again Sam Records/Priority Records
2005	Mouthfeel: Released: January 25, 2005; Label: Daemon Records/DevilDuck Records
2009	Chase Park: Released: September 4, 2009; Released: The Kraft Records
2019	The Circle Is Round: Released: September 27, 2019; Released: Happy Happy Birthday to Me

=== Live albums ===
Year	Album details
2005	Magnapop Live at Maxwell's 03/09/2005: Released: September 3, 2005; Self-released; Format: Digital download

=== Extended plays ===
Title	Year	Label
Sugarland	1992	Play It Again Sam
Kiss My Mouth	1993	Play It Again Sam
Big Bright Cherry	1994	Play It Again Sam
Fire All Your Guns at Once	1996	SideOneDummy Records

== Singles ==
Title	Year	Label	Album
"Rip the Wreck"/"Merry"	1990	Safety Net Records	n/a, released as Homemade Sister
"Merry"/"Complicated"	1992	Caroline	Magnapop
"Slowly, Slowly"	1994	Play It Again Sam	Hot Boxing
"Lay It Down"	1994	Play It Again Sam	Hot Boxing
"Open the Door"	1996	Play It Again Sam	Rubbing Doesn't Help
"This Family"	1996	Play It Again Sam	Rubbing Doesn't Help

"Slowly, Slowly" peaked at number 25 on the Billboard Modern Rock Tracks chart in the United States and spent seven weeks on the chart. "Open the Door" peaked at number 28 on the Billboard Modern Rock Tracks chart in the United States and spent eight weeks on the chart.

=== B-sides ===
The following songs do not appear on a Magnapop album or a compilation featuring the band:

Name	Length	Composer(s)	Producer	Year	Release
"Here It Comes" (Niceley Version)	2:40	Linda Hopper and Ruthie Morris	Ted Niceley	1994	"Slowly, Slowly"
"Merry" (Demo)	2:27	Linda Hopper and Ruthie Morris	Ed Burdell	1990	"Rip the Wreck"
"Open the Door" (Edit)	3:20	Linda Hopper and Ruthie Morris	Geza X	April 15, 1996	"Open the Door"
"Re-hab"	2:37	Linda Hopper and Ruthie Morris	Geza X	April 15, 1996	"Open the Door"
"Rip the Wreck"	2:45	Linda Hopper and Ruthie Morris	Ed Burdell	1990	"Rip the Wreck"
"Song #1"	2:21	Ian Mackaye	Ted Niceley	1994	"Slowly, Slowly"
"This Family" (Mark Freegard Remix)	3:28	Linda Hopper and Ruthie Morris	Geza X	1996	"This Family"
"True Love"	1:56	Linda Hopper and Ruthie Morris	Geza X	April 15, 1996	"Open the Door"

== Music videos ==
Year	Title	Notes
1992	"Merry"	Only broadcast in Europe
1994	"Slowly, Slowly"	–
1994	"Lay It Down"	–
1994	"Texas"	Only broadcast in Australia
1996	"Open the Door"	Directed by Thomas Trail and Ben Unwin, and cut in three different versions—an uncensored one that appeared on MTV, a slightly modified version on The Box, and a performance video that aired in Europe.

== Soundtracks ==
Title	Year	Track(s)	Notes
Mad Love – The Original Motion Picture Soundtrack	June 13, 1995	"Slowly, Slowly"	Film soundtrack released by Zoo Entertainment/Volcano Records on Compact Disc (catalogue number 7244511111) and cassette (31111)
Bio-Dome – The Original Motion Picture Soundtrack	January 9, 1996	"Come on Inside"	Film soundtrack released by Priority (50552) on Compact Disc and cassette tape
Crime + Punishment in Suburbia	August 22, 2000	"This Family"	Film soundtrack released by Milan Records on Compact Disc (A73138 35909-2)

== Tributes ==
Title	Year	Track(s)	Notes
Here No Evil – A Tribute to The Monkees	1992	"Pleasant Valley Sunday"	Released by DB Records/Long Play Records (catalogue number 23) on Compact Disc and cassette tape
Delicacy & Nourishment – Lyrics by Ernest Noyes Brookings Vol. 3	1992	"Ear" (Demo)	Released by East Side Digital (80632) on Compact Disc
Outlaw Blues Volume Two – A Tribute to Bob Dylan	1993	"Every Grain of Sand"	Released by Imaginary Records (040) on Compact Disc
Step Right Up: The Songs of Tom Waits	1995	"Christmas Card from a Hooker in Minneapolis"	Released by Manifesto Records in 1995 (41101) and Virgin Records in February 1996 (30) on Compact Disc, re-released with a slightly different track listing by Manifesto in 2004

== Various artist compilations ==
Title	Year	Track(s)	Notes
De Afrekening, Volume 2	1992	"Merry"	Released by De Afrekening on Compact Disc
The Return of the Furious Swampriders	1993	"Favorite Writer"	Released by Strange Way Records on Compact Disc
De Afrekening, Volume 6	December 20, 1993	"Texas"	Released by De Afrekening on Compact Disc (catalogue number COL 475651-2)
Indie Top 20 – Volume 19	June 6, 1994	"Slowly, Slowly"	Released by Dutch East (5420) on Compact Disc and compiled by Melody Maker
De Afrekening, Volume 7	June 20, 1994	"Slowly, Slowly"	Released by De Afrekening on Compact Disc (COL 477198-2)
CMJ New Music Monthly – Volume 12	August 1994	"Slowly, Slowly"	Released by College Music Journal on Compact Disc (CMJ-NMM012)
CMJ New Music Monthly – Volume 16	December 1994	"Lay It Down"	Released by College Music Journal on Compact Disc (CMJ-NMM016)
De Afrekening, Volume 8	December 1994	"Lay It Down"	Released by Sony Music Entertainment on Compact Disc (COL 478232-2)
Cortex	1994	"Slowly, Slowly"	Released by Cortex on Compact Disc (CTXPROMO1) in Australia
Do Something. Alternative	1994	"Slowly, Slowly"	Released by Sony Music Special Products (5420) on Compact Disc and released through Taco Bell
huH cd 1	1994	"Lay It Down"	Compact Disc (HA0101D) bundled with huH magazine, issue 1
Mouth Watering Good Music (Elixer Sampler)	1994	"Texas"	Released by Priority Records (DPRO 50780) on Compact Disc
Now We Are Six	1994	"Texas"	Released on Compact Disc
Two-track Flexi	1994	"Slowly, Slowly"	Split flexi-disc bundled with Pop Culture Press, issue 31, backed by Velocity Girl's "Marzipan"
The-You-Have-No-Alternative + It's a Priority Sampler	1995	"Skinburns" and "Slowly, Slowly" (Demo)	Released by Priority Records (DPRO 50866) on Compact Disc
Un Printemps 95	March 1995	"Slowly, Slowly"	Compact Disc (INROCK 001 CD PROMO) bundled with Les Inrockuptibles
Rockgarden, Vol. 2	1995	"Lay It Down"	Released by EVA Belgium (7243 8 32561 2) on Compact Disc in Belgium
Rolling Stone: New Voices, Volume 5	April 1996	"This Family"	Compact Disc bundled with the German edition of Rolling Stone
De Afrekening, Volume 11	May 27, 1996	"Come on Inside"	Released by Sony Music Entertainment on Compact Disc (COL 484248-2)
CMJ New Music Monthly – Volume 34	June 1996	"Open the Door"	Released by College Music Journal (CMJ-NMM034) on Compact Disc
Five Ring Circus – 29 Bands from Athens, Georgia	July 15, 1996	"Voice Without a Sound"	Released by Flip Records (1630-2) on Compact Disc
De Afrekening, Volume 12	November 18, 1996	"Open the Door"	Released by Sony Music Entertainment on Compact Disc (COL 486874-2)
Certain Damage – Volume 72	1996	"Come on Inside"	Released by College Music Journal (ST006) on Compact Disc
Checklist File 1	1996	"Come On Inside"	Released by PIAS Benelux (444.0001.29) on Compact Disc in The Netherlands
The Great Summer Pop Sampler	1996	"Cherry Bomb"	Compact Disc bundled with Pop Culture Press, issue 39
huH cd 22	1996	"Hold You Down"	Compact Disc (HD0696D) bundled with huH magazine, issue 22
Music!	1996	"Open the Door"	Released by MNW (MNWPROM 9608) on Compact Disc in Sweden
Priority Records 1996 Rock Retail Sampler	1996	"Juicy Fruit" and "Open the Door"	Released by Priority Records (DPRO 30051) on Compact Disc
Radio 104 WMRQ Back to School	1996	"Open the Door"	Released on Compact Disc
Select Trax – Vol. 6: Alternative Brew	1996	"Open the Door"	Released by Southwest Wholesale (ST006) on Compact Disc
Studio Brussel: 't Gaat Vooruit '96	1996	"Come on Inside"	Released by Double T Music (DTM 613017-2) on Compact Disc in Belgium
Turn It Up & Pass It On – Volume 7	1996	"Open the Door"	Released by AIM Marketing (TIU-9507) on Compact Disc
Pet Sounds, Vol. 1: A Benefit for ALTER	January 1, 1999	"Cherry Bomb"	Released by Vital Cog on Compact Disc (8)
The R.E.M. Collection Disc 2: Michael Stipe Presents	August 2005	"Favorite Writer" (live)	Compact Disc (UNCUT 2005 08B) bundled with Uncut and compiled by Michael Stipe
VISIONS: All Areas, Volume 64	August 2005	"The In-Between"	Compact Disc bundled with Visions, issue 64 in Germany
Strom und Gitarre Folge 1: Let's Go Away for a While	February 28, 2006	"We're Faded"	Released on Compact Disc in Germany

== Radio sessions ==
Title	Year	Song(s)	Notes
John Peel Session	September 2, 1993	"Garden", "Texas", "Favorite Writer", and "The Crush"	"Favorite Writer" and "The Crush" later broadcast on August 5, 1994
Black Session	February 25, 1994	"Garden", "Chemical", "Free Mud", "Lay It Down", "Guess", "Slowly, Slowly", "Get It Right", "13", [Unknown song], "Here It Comes", "The Crush", "Complicated", "Texas", "Skinburns", "Leo", "Merry", and "Piece of Cake"	
Westwood One's On the Edge	October 17, 1994	"Slowly, Slowly", "Lay It Down", "Piece of Cake", and "Idiot Song"	Show #94‒43
Westwood One's On the Edge	June 24, 1996	"Dead Letter", "Open the Door", and "My Best Friend"	Show #96‒26
Westwood One's Out of Order	June 29, 1996	"Open the Door", interview	Show #96‒26
