= List of Magnapop band members =

Magnapop
- Also known as: Homemade Sister, Swell, Swell Dopa
- Years active: 1989–1997, 2002–present
- Members: Linda Hopper; Ruthie Morris; David McNair; Shannon Mulvaney; Scott Rowe; Chad Williams
- Past members: Tim Lee; Mark Posgay; Greg Urbaitis; Johnny Rozas; Brian Fletcher

Magnapop is an alternative rock band based in Atlanta, Georgia. Formed in 1989, the band has consistently included songwriting duo Linda Hopper as vocalist and Ruthie Morris on guitar. Magnapop has had a variety of bass guitarists and drummers to fill out the band.

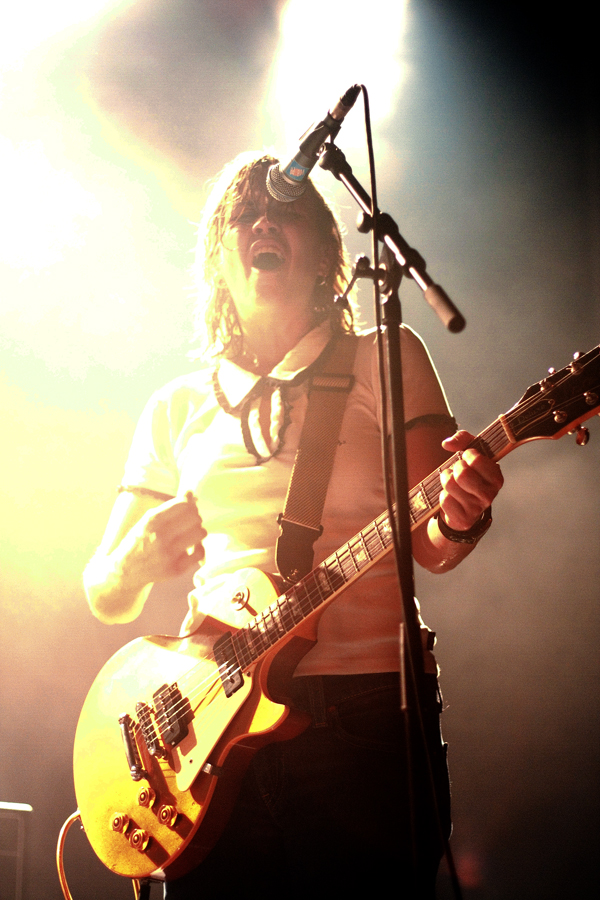
Ruthie Morris (pictured here playing with Magnapop in 2006) has been with the band since its formation.

Linda Hopper co-founded the indie pop group Oh-OK in the 1981, with the band's line-up later including drummer David McNair. That group dissolved a few years later and in 1989, Ruthie Morris moved to Atlanta from West Palm Beach, Florida where the two were introduced by a mutual acquaintance and began songwriting when the first met. The duo had a difficult time finding collaborators to form a complete band (as Hopper described it, "We had to beg people to come and play with us.") They ended up recruiting bassist Tim Lee and McNair on drums in March 1990. Lee left the band after a brief tenure and was replaced by Shannon Mulvaney, whom Morris met at a record store. This quartet went on to record several EPs, two full-length albums, and a handful of singles.

This line-up of the band remained stable until 1995, when McNair and the band parted ways, with neither party giving a definitive rationale. Hopper explained "We had a hard time recording [1994 album] Hot Boxing, because our drummer had a lot of things in the way... Nobody wants to hurt anyone, or to cut them out, but it was just like four adults getting a divorce, and their child is the band." The remaining trio recruited session drummer Josh Freese to record a cover of Tom Waits' "Christmas Card from a Hooker in Minneapolis" in June 1995 for the compilation album Step Right Up: The Songs of Tom Waits. Freese would join them in November–December of that year to record the album Rubbing Doesn't Help. Los Angeles musician Mark Posgay auditioned for the band in 1995 and became the permanent drummer. In late 1996, bassist Mulvaney left the group, citing problems of distance—Hopper and Morris had relocated permanently to Los Angeles—as well as a desire to focus on his family. Greg Urbaitis replaced him as the band continued to play live shows through 1997. Posgay quit that summer and he was replaced by former Lifter drummer Johnny Rozas, but this line-up was short-lived as the band was informed while on tour that their record label ceased to exist and they did not have any funding for future touring or recording. Compounding matters further, they were still under contract to not use the name "Magnapop" for seven more years.

Hopper and Morris continued to play a few acoustic live shows as a duo into 1999, occasionally with accompaniment (such as Philadelphia bassist Billy Warburton and drummer Lance Crow) and attempted to record an EP for Vital Cog with a drum machine as backing, but ended up putting Magnapop on an indefinite hiatus. During this time, Morris also moved to Seattle, where she recorded a 2002 single with drummer Curtis Hall as The New Candidates. Hopper, Morris, and a group of Seattle musicians also demoed some Hopper/Morris songs during this period. Hall would also drum with Hopper, Morris, and Mulvaney for a few Magnapop shows in 2002–2003. The band re-formed in 2003 with bassist Scott Rowe and drummer Brian Fletcher to tour the European festival circuit and record an album.

By 2005, Fletcher had left the group, and drummer Chad Williams had been recruited to replace him on the Mouthfeel tour. This lineup has remained the same since 2005, producing the 2005 live album Magnapop Live at Maxwell's 03/09/2005 and Chase Park in 2009, as well as a number of live performances.

On September 13, 2011, Creative Loafing announced that Mulvaney had attempted to re-form the original line-up of Magnapop to perform a benefit concert for local independent music store Criminal Records. The benefit was later scheduled for October 15, and the band announced that they would be performing their self-titled debut album in its entirety, along with some songs from Hot Boxing.

== Members ==
=== Current members ===
- Linda Hopper

Active: 1989–1997, 2002–present
Role: lyrics, lead vocals, production, songwriting
Appears on:

Albums: Magnapop (1992), Hot Boxing (1994), Rubbing Doesn't Help (1996), Mouthfeel (2005), Magnapop Live at Maxwell's 03/09/2005 (2005), Chase Park (2009), The Circle Is Round (2019)
EPs: Homemade Sister demo tape (1989), Sugarland (1992), Kiss My Mouth (1993), Big Bright Cherry (1994), Fire All Your Guns at Once (1996)
Singles: "Rip the Wreck"/"Merry" (1990), "Merry"/"Complicated" (1992), "Slowly, Slowly" (1994), "Lay It Down" (1994), "Open the Door" (1996), "This Family" (1996)
Compilations: "Pleasant Valley Sunday" from Here No Evil – A Tribute to The Monkees (1992), "Ear" from Delicacy & Nourishment – Lyrics by Ernest Noyes Brookings Vol. 3 (1992), "Every Grain of Sand" from Outlaw Blues Volume Two – A Tribute to Bob Dylan (1993), "Christmas Card from a Hooker in Minneapolis" from Step Right Up: The Songs of Tom Waits (1995), "Favorite Writer" (Live) from The R.E.M. Collection Disc 2: Michael Stipe Presents (2005)

- Ruthie Morris

Active: 1989–1997, 2002–present
Role: guitar, songwriting, production, backing vocals
Appears on:

Albums: Magnapop (1992), Hot Boxing (1994), Rubbing Doesn't Help (1996), Mouthfeel (2005), Magnapop Live at Maxwell's 03/09/2005 (2005), Chase Park (2009), The Circle Is Round (2019)
EPs: Homemade Sister demo tape (1989), Sugarland (1992), Kiss My Mouth (1993), Big Bright Cherry (1994), Fire All Your Guns at Once (1996)
Singles: "Rip the Wreck"/"Merry" (1990), "Merry"/"Complicated" (1992), "Slowly, Slowly" (1994), "Lay It Down" (1994), "Open the Door" (1996), "This Family" (1996)
Compilations: "Pleasant Valley Sunday" from Here No Evil – A Tribute to The Monkees (1992), "Ear" from Delicacy & Nourishment – Lyrics by Ernest Noyes Brookings Vol. 3 (1992), "Every Grain of Sand" from Outlaw Blues Volume Two – A Tribute to Bob Dylan (1993), "Christmas Card from a Hooker in Minneapolis" from Step Right Up: The Songs of Tom Waits (1995), "Favorite Writer" (Live) from The R.E.M. Collection Disc 2: Michael Stipe Presents (2005)

- David McNair

Active: 1989–1995, 2011–present
Role: drums
Appears on:

Albums: Magnapop (1992), Hot Boxing (1994), The Circle Is Round (2019)
EPs: Homemade Sister demo tape (1989), Sugarland (1992), Kiss My Mouth (1993), Big Bright Cherry (1994)
Singles: "Rip the Wreck"/"Merry" (1990), "Merry"/"Complicated" (1992), "Slowly, Slowly" (1994), "Lay It Down" (1994)
Compilations: "Pleasant Valley Sunday" from Here No Evil – A Tribute to The Monkees (1992), "Ear" from Delicacy & Nourishment – Lyrics by Ernest Noyes Brookings Vol. 3 (1992), "Every Grain of Sand" from Outlaw Blues Volume Two – A Tribute to Bob Dylan (1993)

- Shannon Mulvaney

Active: 1990–1995, 2002–2003, 2011–present
Role: bass guitar
Appears on:

Albums: Magnapop (1992), Hot Boxing (1994), Rubbing Doesn't Help (1996), The Circle Is Round (2019)
EPs: Homemade Sister demo tape (1989), Sugarland (1992), Kiss My Mouth (1993), Big Bright Cherry (1994), Fire All Your Guns at Once (1996)
Singles: "Rip the Wreck"/"Merry" (1990), "Merry"/"Complicated" (1992), "Slowly, Slowly" (1994), "Lay It Down" (1994), "Open the Door" (1996), "This Family" (1996)
Compilations: "Pleasant Valley Sunday" from Here No Evil – A Tribute to The Monkees (1992), "Ear" from Delicacy & Nourishment – Lyrics by Ernest Noyes Brookings Vol. 3 (1992), "Every Grain of Sand" from Outlaw Blues Volume Two – A Tribute to Bob Dylan (1993), "Christmas Card from a Hooker in Minneapolis" from Step Right Up: The Songs of Tom Waits (1995)

=== Former members ===
- Tim Lee

Active: 1989–1990
Role: bass guitar

- Mark Posgay

Active: 1996–1997
Role: drums

- Johnny Rozas

Active: 1997
Role: drums

- Greg Urbaitis

Active: 1996–1997
Role: bass guitar

- Brian Fletcher

Active: 2004–2005
Role: drums
Appears on:

Albums: Mouthfeel (2005)

- Scott Rowe

Active: 2004–2011
Role: bass guitar, songwriting, production
Appears on:

Albums: Mouthfeel (2005), Magnapop Live at Maxwell's 03/09/2005 (2005), Chase Park (2009)

- Chad Williams

Active: 2004–2011
Role: drums, production
Appears on:

Albums: Magnapop Live at Maxwell's 03/09/2005 (2005), Chase Park (2009)

== Timeline ==
Linda Hopper – Vocals
Linda Hopper – Vocals
Ruthie Morris – Guitar, backing vocals
Ruthie Morris – Guitar, backing vocals
^{Tim Lee}
Shannon Mulvaney – Bass guitar
Greg Urbaitis
Scott Rowe – Bass guitar
David McNair – Drums
^{Mark Posgay}
^{Johnny Rozas}
^{Brian Fletcher}
Chad Williams – Drums
│
1989
│
1990
│
1991
│
1992
│
1993
│
1994
│
1995
│
1996
│
1997
│
1998
│
1999
│
2000
│
2001
│
2002
│
2003
│
2004
│
2005
│
2006
│
2007
│
2008
│
2009
│
2010
│
2011
│
2012
│
2013
│
2014
│
2015
│
2016
│
2017
│
2018
│
2019
│
2020
│
2021
│
2022
│
2023
│
2024
│
2025
│
2026
Band members and studio albums
