= List of songs recorded by Magnapop =

This list of songs recorded by Magnapop includes 106 different recordings released by the Atlanta alternative rock band Magnapop.

Name	Length	Composer(s)	Producer	Year	Release	Notes
"13"	2:42	Chris Bell and Alex Chilton	Magnapop	October 16, 1992	Magnapop	Big Star cover, originally titled "Thirteen"
"An Apology"	3:04	Linda Hopper and Ruthie Morris	Geza X	May 21, 1996	Rubbing Doesn't Help	
"Bangkok"	3:18	Linda Hopper and Ruthie Morris	Brian Paulson	September 4, 2009	Chase Park	
"Blue Cheer"	2:59	Linda Hopper and Ruthie Morris	Brian Paulson	September 4, 2009	Chase Park	
"Bring It to Me"	2:13	Linda Hopper and Ruthie Morris	Brian Paulson	September 4, 2009	Chase Park	
"California"	3:56	Linda Hopper and Ruthie Morris	Brian Paulson	September 4, 2009	Chase Park	
"California" (Live at Maxwell's)	4:31	Linda Hopper and Ruthie Morris	Magnapop	September 3, 2005	Magnapop Live at Maxwell's 03/09/2005	
"Chemical"	3:31	Linda Hopper and Ruthie Morris	Michael Stipe	October 16, 1992	Magnapop	
"Cherry Bomb"	2:15	Linda Hopper and Ruthie Morris	Geza X	May 21, 1996	Rubbing Doesn't Help	
"Christmas Card from a Hooker in Minneapolis"	4:30	Tom Waits	Magnapop	1994	Step Right Up: The Songs of Tom Waits	Tom Waits cover
"Come On Inside"	2:43	Linda Hopper and Ruthie Morris	Geza X	May 21, 1996	Rubbing Doesn't Help	
"Come On Inside" (Extended Version)	2:58	Linda Hopper and Ruthie Morris	Geza X	January 1996	Fire All Your Guns at Once	
"Complicated"	1:52	Linda Hopper and Ruthie Morris	Michael Stipe	October 16, 1992	Magnapop	Also appears on "Merry"
"The Crush"	3:21	Linda Hopper and Ruthie Morris	Bob Mould	1994	Big Bright Cherry	Also appears on Hot Boxing and "Lay It Down"
"Dead Letter"	3:31	Linda Hopper and Ruthie Morris	Geza X	May 21, 1996	Rubbing Doesn't Help	Part of a hidden track with "Suck It Up"
"Down On Me"	3:18	Linda Hopper and Ruthie Morris	Geza X	January 1996	Fire All Your Guns at Once	Also appears on Rubbing Doesn't Help
"Ear"	2:21	Ernest Noyes Brookings (lyrics) and Linda Hopper and Ruthie Morris (instrumentation)	Magnapop	October 16, 1992	Magnapop	
"Ear" (Demo)	2:36	Ernest Noyes Brookings (lyrics) and Linda Hopper and Ruthie Morris (instrumentation)	Magnapop	1992	Delicacy & Nourishment – Lyrics by Ernest Noyes Brookings Vol. 3	
"Elliott"	2:42	Linda Hopper and Ruthie Morris	Curt Wells	January 25, 2005	Mouthfeel	
"Emergency"	4:00	Linda Hopper and Ruthie Morris	Bob Mould	July 5, 1994	Hot Boxing	
"Evergleam"	3:00	Linda Hopper and Ruthie Morris	Brian Paulson	September 4, 2009	Chase Park	
"Every Grain of Sand"	4:22	Bob Dylan	Magnapop	1993	Outlaw Blues Volume Two – A Tribute to Bob Dylan	Bob Dylan cover
"Favorite Writer"	2:56	Linda Hopper and Ruthie Morris	Michael Stipe	October 16, 1992	Magnapop	
"Favorite Writer" (Live, 2005)	2:31	Linda Hopper and Ruthie Morris	Magnapop	August 2005	The R.E.M. Collection Disc 2: Michael Stipe Presents	
"Feedback Blues"	3:24	Linda Hopper and Ruthie Morris	Brian Paulson	September 4, 2009	Chase Park	
"Firebrand"	2:29	Linda Hopper and Ruthie Morris	Geza X	May 21, 1996	Rubbing Doesn't Help	
"Free Mud"	2:00	Linda Hopper and Ruthie Morris	Bob Mould	July 5, 1994	Hot Boxing	
"Future Forward"	2:46	Linda Hopper, Ruthie Morris, and Scott Rowe	Brian Paulson	September 4, 2009	Chase Park	
"Future Forward" (Live at Maxwell's)	3:22	Linda Hopper and Ruthie Morris	Magnapop	September 3, 2005	Magnapop Live at Maxwell's 03/09/2005	
"Game of Pricks" (Live, 2004)	1:41	Robert Pollard	Magnapop	2005	Mouthfeel German edition	
"Game of Pricks" (Live at Maxwell's)	1:59	Robert Pollard	Magnapop	September 3, 2005	Magnapop Live at Maxwell's 03/09/2005	
"Garden"	2:21	Linda Hopper and Ruthie Morris	Magnapop	June 8, 1992	Sugarland	Also appears on Magnapop
"Get It Right"	1:52	Linda Hopper and Ruthie Morris	Bob Mould	July 5, 1994	Hot Boxing	
"Get It Right" (Live at Maxwell's)	2:11	Linda Hopper and Ruthie Morris	Magnapop	September 3, 2005	Magnapop Live at Maxwell's 03/09/2005	
"Guess"	2:53	Linda Hopper and Ruthie Morris	Magnapop	October 16, 1992	Magnapop	
"Here It Comes"	2:49	Linda Hopper and Ruthie Morris	Bob Mould	1994	Big Bright Cherry	Also appears on Hot Boxing
"Here It Comes" (Niceley Version)	2:40	Linda Hopper and Ruthie Morris	Ted Niceley	1994	"Slowly, Slowly"	
"Hold You Down"	3:14	Linda Hopper and Ruthie Morris	Geza X	January 1996	Fire All Your Guns at Once	Also appears on the Dutch edition of Rubbing Doesn't Help
"Hold You Down" (New Mix)	2:43	Linda Hopper and Ruthie Morris	Geza X	1996	Rubbing Doesn't Help Japanese edition	
"I Don't Care"	2:40	Linda Hopper and Ruthie Morris	Geza X	May 21, 1996	Rubbing Doesn't Help	
"I Don't Care" (Live, 2004)	2:35	Linda Hopper and Ruthie Morris	Magnapop	2005	Mouthfeel German edition	
"I Don't Care" (Live at Maxwell's)	4:27	Linda Hopper and Ruthie Morris	Magnapop	September 3, 2005	Magnapop Live at Maxwell's 03/09/2005	
"Idiot Song"	1:55	Linda Hopper and Ruthie Morris	Bob Mould	July 5, 1994	Hot Boxing	
"The In-Between"	3:18	Linda Hopper, Ruthie Morris, and Scott Rowe	Curt Wells	January 25, 2005	Mouthfeel	
"The In-Between" (Live at Maxwell's)	3:57	Linda Hopper, Ruthie Morris, and Scott Rowe	Magnapop	September 3, 2005	Magnapop Live at Maxwell's 03/09/2005	
"In the Way"	2:32	Linda Hopper and Ruthie Morris	Bob Mould	July 5, 1994	Hot Boxing	
"Jesus"	1:53	Janet English, Mark Maher, and Damian Whitty	Brian Paulson	March 30, 2010	Chase Park Compact Disc version	Spiderbait cover
"Juicy Fruit"	2:18	Linda Hopper and Ruthie Morris	Geza X	May 21, 1996	Rubbing Doesn't Help	
"Lay It Down"	2:59	Linda Hopper and Ruthie Morris	Bob Mould	July 5, 1994	Hot Boxing	Also appears on "Lay It Down", made into a music video
"Lay It Down" (Demo)	2:57	Linda Hopper and Ruthie Morris	Ted Niceley	1993	Kiss My Mouth	
"Lay It Down" (Live, 2004)	3:02	Linda Hopper and Ruthie Morris	Magnapop	2005	Mouthfeel German edition	
"Leo"	2:37	Linda Hopper and Ruthie Morris	Bob Mould	July 5, 1994	Hot Boxing	
"Lions and Lambs"	2:29	Linda Hopper and Ruthie Morris	Brian Paulson	September 4, 2009	Chase Park	
"Looking for Ghosts"	3:10	Linda Hopper and Ruthie Morris	Brian Paulson	September 4, 2009	Chase Park	
"Merry"	3:04	Linda Hopper and Ruthie Morris	Michael Stipe	June 8, 1992	Sugarland	Also appears on Magnapop and "Merry", made into a music video
"Merry" (Acoustic)	3:26	Linda Hopper and Ruthie Morris	Magnapop	1994	Big Bright Cherry	Also appears on the limited edition of Hot Boxing
"Merry" (Demo)	2:27	Linda Hopper and Ruthie Morris	Ed Burdell	1990	"Rip the Wreck"	Recorded as Homemade Sister
"Merry" (Live at Maxwell's)	3:15	Linda Hopper and Ruthie Morris	Magnapop	September 3, 2005	Magnapop Live at Maxwell's 03/09/2005	
"My Best Friend"	3:26	Linda Hopper and Ruthie Morris	Geza X	May 21, 1996	Rubbing Doesn't Help	
"Need More"	3:34	Linda Hopper and Ruthie Morris	Brian Paulson	September 4, 2009	Chase Park	
"Nowhere"	2:53	Linda Hopper and Ruthie Morris	Ted Niceley	1993	Kiss My Mouth	
"Open the Door"	3:38	Linda Hopper and Ruthie Morris	Geza X	April 15, 1996	"Open the Door"	Also appears on Rubbing Doesn't Help, made into a music video
"Open the Door" (Edit)	3:20	Linda Hopper and Ruthie Morris	Geza X	April 15, 1996	"Open the Door"	
"Open the Door" (Live, 2004)	3:13	Linda Hopper and Ruthie Morris	Magnapop	2005	Mouthfeel German edition	
"Slowly, Slowly" (Live at Maxwell's)	3:49	Linda Hopper and Ruthie Morris	Magnapop	September 3, 2005	Magnapop Live at Maxwell's 03/09/2005	
"PDX"	2:11	Linda Hopper and Ruthie Morris	Curt Wells	January 25, 2005	Mouthfeel	
"PDX" (Live at Maxwell's)	2:19	Linda Hopper and Ruthie Morris	Magnapop	September 3, 2005	Magnapop Live at Maxwell's 03/09/2005	
"Piece of Cake"	2:49	Linda Hopper and Ruthie Morris	Bob Mould	July 5, 1994	Hot Boxing	Also appears on "Lay It Down"
"Pilgrim's Prayer"	2:28	Linda Hopper and Ruthie Morris	Curt Wells	January 25, 2005	Mouthfeel	
"Pleasant Valley Sunday"	3:15	Gerry Goffin and Carole King	Magnapop	1992	Here No Evil – A Tribute to The Monkees	The Monkees cover
"Precious"	1:48	Linda Hopper and Ruthie Morris	Ted Niceley	1993	Kiss My Mouth	
"Pretend I'm There"	2:35	Linda Hopper and Ruthie Morris	Curt Wells	January 25, 2005	Mouthfeel	
"Pretend I'm There" (Live at Maxwell's)	3:13	Linda Hopper and Ruthie Morris	Magnapop	September 3, 2005	Magnapop Live at Maxwell's 03/09/2005	
"Pretty Awful"	2:24	Linda Hopper and Ruthie Morris	Bob Mould	1994	Hot Boxing limited edition	
"Puff"	3:16	Linda Hopper and Ruthie Morris	Ted Niceley	1994	Big Bright Cherry	Also appears on "Slowly, Slowly"
"Q-Tip"	1:58	Linda Hopper and Ruthie Morris	Brian Paulson	September 4, 2009	Chase Park	
"Radio Waves"	2:32	Linda Hopper and Ruthie Morris	Geza X	May 21, 1996	Rubbing Doesn't Help	
"Re-hab"	2:37	Linda Hopper and Ruthie Morris	Geza X	April 15, 1996	"Open the Door"	
"Ride"	2:30	Linda Hopper and Ruthie Morris	Bob Mould	July 5, 1994	Hot Boxing	
"Rip the Wreck"	2:45	Linda Hopper and Ruthie Morris	Ed Burdell	1990	"Rip the Wreck"	Recorded as Homemade Sister
"Satellite"	3:05	Linda Hopper, Ruthie Morris, and Scott Rowe	Curt Wells	January 25, 2005	Mouthfeel	
"Satellite" (Live at Maxwell's)	3:15	Linda Hopper, Ruthie Morris, and Scott Rowe	Magnapop	September 3, 2005	Magnapop Live at Maxwell's 03/09/2005	
"Skinburns"	4:24	Linda Hopper and Ruthie Morris	Bob Mould	July 5, 1994	Hot Boxing	
"Skinburns" (Demo)	4:03	Linda Hopper and Ruthie Morris	Magnapop	June 8, 1992	Sugarland	Also appears on the 1997 re-release of Magnapop
"Slowly, Slowly"	3:36	Linda Hopper and Ruthie Morris	Bob Mould	1994	Big Bright Cherry	Also appears on Hot Boxing, "Lay It Down", and "Slowly, Slowly", made into a music video
"Slowly, Slowly" (Demo)	3:41	Linda Hopper and Ruthie Morris	Magnapop	1994	Big Bright Cherry	
"Slowly, Slowly" (Live at Maxwell's)	3:40	Linda Hopper and Ruthie Morris	Magnapop	September 3, 2005	Magnapop Live at Maxwell's 03/09/2005	
"Snake"	5:00	Linda Hopper, Shannon Mulvaney, and Ruthie Morris	Geza X	May 21, 1996	Rubbing Doesn't Help	
"Snake" (Demo)	5:44	Linda Hopper, Shannon Mulvaney, and Ruthie Morris	Magnapop	June 8, 1992	Sugarland	Also appears on the 1997 re-release of Magnapop
"Song #1"	2:21	Ian Mackaye	Ted Niceley	1994	"Slowly, Slowly"	
"Smile 4u"	2:21	Linda Hopper and Ruthie Morris	Curt Wells	January 25, 2005	Mouthfeel	
"Smile 4u" (Live at Maxwell's)	2:36	Linda Hopper and Ruthie Morris	Magnapop	September 3, 2005	Magnapop Live at Maxwell's 03/09/2005	
"Spill It"	2:48	Linda Hopper and Ruthie Morris	Magnapop	October 16, 1992	Magnapop	
"Stick to Me"	2:48	Linda Hopper and Ruthie Morris	Curt Wells	January 25, 2005	Mouthfeel	
"Stick to Me" (Live at Maxwell's)	2:55	Linda Hopper and Ruthie Morris	Magnapop	September 3, 2005	Magnapop Live at Maxwell's 03/09/2005	
"Straight to You"	2:42	Linda Hopper and Ruthie Morris	Brian Paulson	September 4, 2009	Chase Park	
"Suck It Up"	3:59	Linda Hopper and Ruthie Morris	Geza X	May 21, 1996	Rubbing Doesn't Help	Part of a hidden track with "Dead Letter"
"Texas"	4:01	Linda Hopper and Ruthie Morris	Bob Mould	July 5, 1994	Hot Boxing	Made into a music video
"Texas" (Remix)	4:32	Linda Hopper and Ruthie Morris	Ted Niceley	1993	Kiss My Mouth	
"Think for Yourself"	3:04	Linda Hopper and Ruthie Morris	Curt Wells	January 25, 2005	Mouthfeel	
"This Family"	3:28	Linda Hopper and Ruthie Morris	Geza X	May 21, 1996	Rubbing Doesn't Help	Also appears on "This Family"
"This Family" (Mark Freegard Remix)	3:28	Linda Hopper and Ruthie Morris	Geza X	1996	"This Family"	
"True Love"	1:56	Linda Hopper and Ruthie Morris	Geza X	April 15, 1996	"Open the Door"	
"Voice Without a Sound"	2:41	Linda Hopper and Ruthie Morris	Geza X	January 1996	Fire All Your Guns at Once	Also appears on the Japanese edition of Rubbing Doesn't Help
"We're Faded"	2:18	Linda Hopper and Ruthie Morris	Curt Wells	January 25, 2005	Mouthfeel	
"We're Faded" (Live at Maxwell's)	2:17	Linda Hopper and Ruthie Morris	Magnapop	September 3, 2005	Magnapop Live at Maxwell's 03/09/2005	

== Cover versions of Magnapop songs ==
Name	Artist	Length	Composer(s)	Producer	Year	Release	Notes
"Open the Door"	Eels	3:03	Linda Hopper and Ruthie Morris	E	June 12, 2000	"Flyswatter"	Also appears on Useless Trinkets: B-Sides, Soundtracks, Rarities and Unreleased 1996–2006
"Favorite Writer"	R.E.M.	2:58	Linda Hopper and Ruthie Morris	Patrick Mccarthy	October 2003	"Bad Day"	
