= Crime + Punishment in Suburbia =

Soundtrack album by various artists
- Released: August 22, 2000
- Length: 41:14
- Label: Milan Records

Professional ratings
Review scores
Source	Rating
Allmusic	3/5 stars

Crime + Punishment in Suburbia was a soundtrack for Crime and Punishment in Suburbia released in 2000. It contains 12 tracks of alternative music including the Pixies cover "Monkey Gone to Heaven" by Far.

== Track listing ==
1. Modest Mouse – "Trailer Trash" (Isaac Brock/Jeremiah Green/Eric Judy) – 5:47
2. Frank Black – "Bullet" (Frank Black) – 2:30
3. Far – "Monkey Gone to Heaven" (Black Francis) – 5:02
4. Magnapop – "This Family" (Linda Hopper/Ruthie Morris) – 3:28
5. Meat Puppets – "Two Rivers" (Curt Kirkwood) – 3:21
6. Joey Santiago – "Damaged Little Fuckers" (Joey Santiago) – 2:03
7. Sleater-Kinney – "Burn, Don't Freeze" (Carrie Brownstein/Corin Tucker/Janet Weiss) – 3:15
8. OP8 – "Sand" (Lee Hazlewood) – 4:38
9. Toadies – "Mister Love" (Todd Lewis) – 2:51
10. Sound Furnace – "High School Cannibal Party" (Damian Wagner) – 1:50
11. Extra Fancy – "Sinnerman" (David Foster/Brian Grillo/Michael Hateley/Derek O'Brien) – 4:04
12. Guided by Voices – "Learning to Hunt" (Robert Pollard) – 2:26
