= Hold You Down =

Hold You Down may refer to:

== Music ==
- "Hold You Down" (Jennifer Lopez song), a 2005 song by Jennifer Lopez featuring Fat Joe
- "Hold You Down" (The Alchemist song), song by The Alchemist featuring Nina Sky & Prodigy
- "Hold You Down" (DJ Khaled song), song by DJ Khaled featuring Chris Brown, August Alsina, Future, Jeremih
- "Hold You Down" (X Ambassadors song), song by American rock band X Ambassadors
- "Hold You Down", song by Childish Gambino from Camp
- "Hold You Down", song by Magnapop from the albums Rubbing Doesn't Help and Fire All Your Guns at Once
- "Hold You Down", single by Jadakiss from I Love You (A Dedication to My Fans)
- "Hold You Down", single by Kareem Rush
- "Hold You Down", song by Tim Dog from BX Warrior
- "Hold You Down", song by rapper Red Café with guest appearance by Teyana Taylor
- "Hold You Down", song by rapper Raekwon featuring Faith Evans from Lost Jewlry
- "Hold You Down", song by band Jump Little Children from Between the Dim & the Dark
- "Hold You Down", song by Snow Tha Product from Good Nights & Bad Mornings 2: The Hangover
- "Hold You Down", song by band Sultans from Ghost Ship
- "Hold You Down", song by Jon B from Holiday Wishes: From Me to You
- "Hold You Down", song by rapper Freeway from Freedom of Speech
- "Everything (Hold You Down)", by Killer Mike from Pledge

== Television ==
- "Hold You Down", episode of reality TV show Love & Hip Hop
