= Big Bright Cherry =

EP by Magnapop
- Released: 1994
- Recorded: August 1993
- Studio: Pedernales Recording (Spicewood, Texas); Bosstown (Atlanta, Georgia)
- Genre: Pop punk, pop rock, power pop
- Length: 20:05
- Language: English
- Label: Play It Again Sam
- Producer: Magnapop, Bob Mould, Ted Niceley

Magnapop chronology
Magnapop (1992)	Big Bright Cherry (1994)	Hot Boxing (1994)

Magnapop EPs chronology
Kiss My Mouth (1994)	Big Bright Cherry (1994)	Fire All Your Guns at Once (1996)

Big Bright Cherry is a 1994 EP by Magnapop released promotionally in the United States by Play It Again Sam Records on Compact Disc (catalogue number DPRO 50803) and 10" gramophone record red vinyl (SPRO 50803.) Several of these songs also appear on the studio album Hot Boxing.

== Track listing ==
All songs written by Linda Hopper and Ruthie Morris

1. "Puff" – 3:16
2. "Slowly, Slowly" – 3:36
3. "Slowly, Slowly" (Demo) – 3:41
4. "The Crush" – 3:21
5. "Here It Comes" – 2:49
6. "Merry" (Acoustic) – 3:22

== Personnel ==
Magnapop

- Linda Hopper – lead vocals
- David McNair – drums
- Ruthie Morris – guitar, backing vocals
- Shannon Mulvaney – bass guitar

Technical staff

- David Collins – remastering at A&M Studios
- Magnapop – production on "Slowly, Slowly" (Demo) and "Merry" (Acoustic)
- Ruth Leitman – art direction, photography
- Bob Mould – production on "Slowly, Slowly", "The Crush", and "Here It Comes"
- Ted Niceley – production on "Puff"
- Valerie Raimonde – design
- Jim Wilson – engineering
