= Kiss My Mouth =

EP by Magnapop
- Released: 1993
- Recorded: 1992–1993
- Genre: Pop punk, pop rock, power pop
- Length: 12:10
- Language: English
- Label: Play It Again Sam
- Producer: Ted Niceley

Magnapop chronology
Magnapop (1992)	Kiss My Mouth (1993)	Hot Boxing (1994)

Magnapop EPs chronology
Sugarland (1992)	Kiss My Mouth (1992)	Big Bright Cherry (1994)

Kiss My Mouth is a 1993 EP by Magnapop released in Europe by Play It Again Sam Records on Compact Disc (catalogue number 450.0243.22 - BIAS 243 CD) and 12" gramophone record (450.0243.30 - BIAS 243.) Two of these tracks would later be re-recorded for their 1994 studio album Hot Boxing.

== Track listing ==
All songs written by Linda Hopper and Ruthie Morris

1. "Texas" (Remix) – 4:32
2. "Lay It Down" – 2:57
3. "Precious" – 1:48
4. "Nowhere" – 2:53

== Personnel ==
Magnapop

- Linda Hopper – lead vocals
- David McNair – drums
- Ruthie Morris – guitar, backing vocals
- Shannon Mulvaney – bass guitar

Production

- Chris Bilheimer – design
- Eli Janney – engineering
- Ruth Leitman – photography
- Ted Niceley – production
- Jim Rondinelli – remixing on "Texas"
