= Merry (song) =

""Rip the Wreck"/"Merry""
- The single was issued with bright yellow and bright green covers

Single by Magnapop
- A-side: "Rip the Wreck"
- B-side: "Merry"
- Released: 1990
- Recorded: 1990, Furies Studios, Marietta, Georgia, United States
- Genre: Pop punk
- Length: 5:12
- Label: Safety Net
- Songwriter(s): Linda Hopper, Ruthie Morris
- Producer(s): Ed Burdell

Magnapop singles chronology
"Rip the Wreck" / "Merry" (1990)	"Merry" / "Complicated" (1992)

""Merry"/"Complicated""

Single by Magnapop
- A-side: "Merry"
- B-side: "Complicated"
- Released: 1992
- Recorded: December 1990, John Keane Studio, Atlanta, Georgia
- Genre: Pop punk
- Length: 4:58
- Label: Solid
- Songwriter(s): Linda Hopper, Ruthie Morris
- Producer(s): Michael Stipe

Magnapop singles chronology
"Rip the Wreck" / "Merry" (1990)	"Merry" / "Complicated" (1992)	"Slowly, Slowly" (1994)

"Merry" is a song by American power pop band Magnapop. It was initially released in 1990 as the B-side to a 7" through Safety Net Records (catalogue number NET 17) under the band's original name of Homemade Sister. The song was re-recorded and released again on the EP Sugarland as well as the band's self-titled debut album in 1992 on Solid Records (527.9013.40.)

A live acoustic recording of the song from June 7, 1992, was released on the EP Big Bright Cherry as well as the special edition of the studio album Hot Boxing. A new studio recording of it appears on the 2019 album The Circle Is Round.

NME described the second recording as "a sublime piece of pop supremacy" and James Sullivan, writing for Addicted to Noise in 1996 declared it one of the group's finest songs.

== Track listing ==
All songs written by Linda Hopper and Ruthie Morris

1990 release

1. "Rip the Wreck" – 2:45
2. "Merry" – 2:27

1992 release

1. "Merry" – 3:05
2. "Complicated" – 1:53

== Personnel ==
Magnapop

- Linda Hopper – lead vocals
- David McNair – drums
- Ruthie Morris – lead guitar
- Shannon Mulvaney – bass guitar

Production staff

- Bill Ashton – engineering (original release)
- Ed Burdell – production (original release)
- Cathy Carmichael – photography (original release)
- Michael Stipe – production (later release)
- Gina Tackett – photography (original release)
