= Guy Burwell =

American artist

- Known for: Posters, Music, Flyers, Painting, Rock concerts
- Movement: Gig posters, Post Neo Explosionism Indie rock, Propaganda, Lowbrow art, Punk rock

Guy Burwell (born 1965) is an illustrator and designer based in Portland, Oregon. He is primarily known for making limited edition rock concert posters. Despite the fact that rock posters are a predominantly American art form, Burwell's work is also highly appreciated and collected in Europe.

Burwell's art has been featured in numerous articles, as well as in the definitive books of the genre such as Gig Posters Vol. 1: Rock Show Art of the 21st Century by Clay Hayes and Art of Modern Rock: The Poster Explosion by Paul Grushkin and Dennis King. Guy Burwell also contributed art for the cover of Germany's Low Magazine, Vol. 6 of June 2010 and has been featured in Voice Magazine's 11th volume dedicated to Rock Art. He headlined the Röckaholics II Rock Art Show in Zurich, Switzerland alongside other famous gig poster artists and created the official show poster.

== Notable Band Posters Illustrated ==
- Phish
- Mudhoney
- Bright Eyes
- Bad Religion
- Jet
- The Decemberists
- John Doe
- The Dandy Warhols
- Yo La Tengo
- Pernice Brothers
- Melvins
- Neko Case
- Nada Surf
- My Morning Jacket
- Magnapop
- Pearl Jam
- Faith No More
- Nine Inch Nails
- Foo Fighters
