= New Coat of Paint =

Compilation album by Various artists
- Released: 2000
- Label: Manifesto

New Coat of Paint is the title of a tribute album to Tom Waits, released in 2000 by Manifesto Records. The songs are performed by various artists.

== Track listing ==
1. "Whistlin' Past the Graveyard" - [03:37] Screamin' Jay Hawkins
2. "Pasties and a G-String" - [02:23] Andre Williams
3. "Heartattack and Vine" - [05:07] Lydia Lunch feat. Nels Cline
4. "Virginia Avenue" - [03:23] Knoxville Girls
5. "Romeo Is Bleeding" - [03:33] Dexter Romweber's Infernal Racket
6. "New Coat of Paint" - [03:43] Lee Rocker
7. "Broken Bicycles" - [03:49] Botanica
8. "Old Boyfriends" - [04:45] Preacher Boy
9. "Please Call Me, Baby" - [05:10] Sally Norvell
10. "On The Nickel" - [05:45] Carla Bozulich
11. "Muriel" - [03:59] Eleni Mandell
12. "Poncho's Lament" - [04:27] The Blacks
13. "Christmas Card from a Hooker in Minneapolis" - [03:41] Neko Case
14. "Blue Skies" - [03:08] Floyd Dixon
