= Magnapop =

American pop punk band formed in 1989

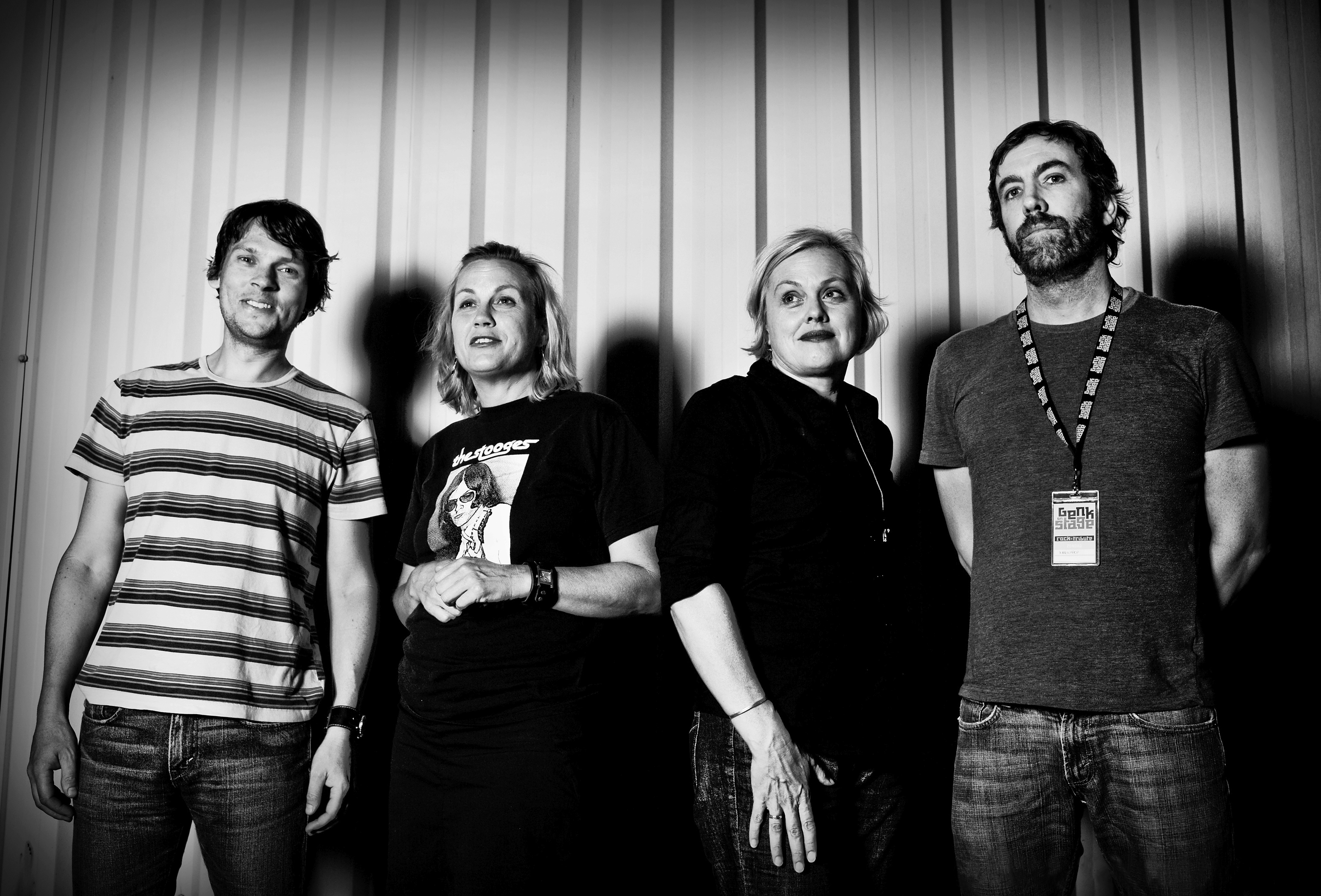
- Magnapop in 2010, from left to right: Scott Rowe, Ruthie Morris, Linda Hopper, and Chad Williams

Background information
- Also known as: Homemade Sister; Swell; Swell Dopa; Linda & Ruthie
- Origin: Atlanta, Georgia, U.S.
- Genres: Alternative rock; power pop; pop rock; pop punk
- Years active: 1989–1997; 2002–present
- Labels: Caroline; Daemon; King; Never; PIAS; Priority, Safety Net; SideOneDummy; Solid
- Members: Linda Hopper; Ruthie Morris; David McNair; Shannon Mulvaney
- Past members: Tim Lee; Mark Posgay; Greg Urbaitis; Johnny Rozas; Brian Fletcher; Scott Rowe; Chad Williams; List of members
- Website: magnapop.com

Magnapop is an American rock band based in Atlanta, Georgia. Formed in 1989, the band has consistently included songwriting duo Linda Hopper as vocalist and Ruthie Morris on guitar. Magnapop first achieved recognition in the Benelux countries of Belgium, the Netherlands and Luxembourg through the festival circuit and have remained popular in Europe throughout their career. After modest success in the United States in the mid-1990s with the singles "Slowly, Slowly" and "Open the Door" and a series of albums produced by Michael Stipe, Bob Mould, and Geza X, the band went on an extended hiatus due to the dissolution of their record label. They returned with a new rhythm section in 2005 on the Daemon Records release Mouthfeel. The band has continued to perform and record since this reunion and have self-released two more albums. Magnapop's musical style is noted for blending the pop vocals and melodies of Hopper with the aggressive, punk-influenced guitar-playing of Morris and her back-up vocal harmonies.

== History ==
=== Formation and self-titled debut (1989–1993) ===
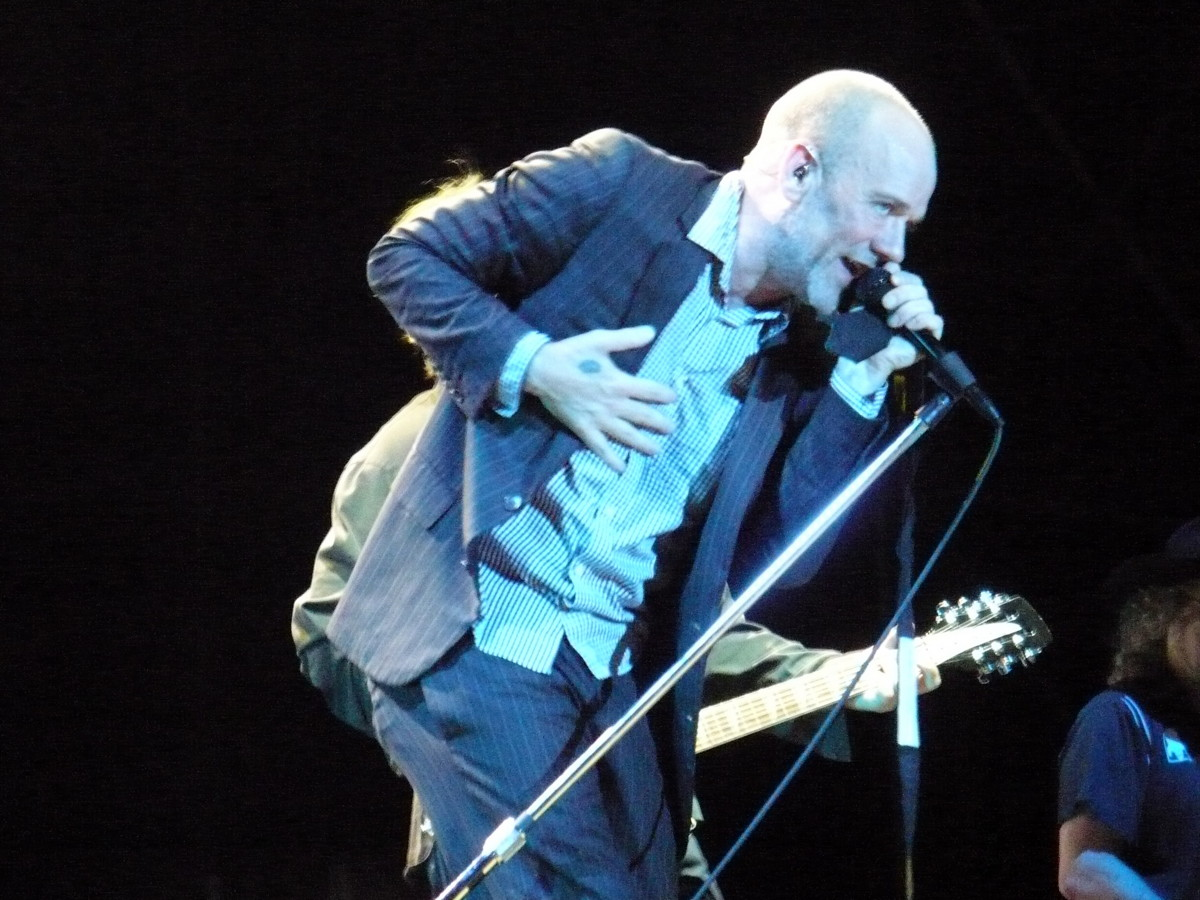
Linda Hopper's friendship with Michael Stipe would prove important for Magnapop's success. Stipe—depicted here performing with R.E.M. in 2008—produced Magnapop's demo which was later released as their first studio album and premiered the band at a showcase in New York.

Linda Hopper—a native of Marietta, Georgia—was a member of the late 1970s/early 1980s music scene in Athens, Georgia, where she befriended fellow University of Georgia student Michael Stipe in an art design class. Stipe went on to form R.E.M. and Hopper joined him in the experimental music group Tanzplagen along with Stipe's sister, Lynda, and other local musicians. After the group folded, Lynda Stipe and Hopper formed Oh-OK, whose line-up later included Matthew Sweet and David McNair. That project ended in 1984 and Hopper briefly belonged to a Washington, D.C. band named Holiday, who released their only EP in 1987.

In 1989, Ruthie Morris had recently moved to Atlanta from West Palm Beach, Florida—where she played a few shows as the guitarist for The Pockets. She attempted to play with local male musicians, but did not feel comfortable with any of them. Hopper and Morris were introduced by a mutual acquaintance and became fast friends; they wrote their first song together at Hopper's apartment the day they met. The duo had a difficult time finding collaborators to form a complete band (as Hopper described it, "We had to beg people to come and play with us.") The duo eventually recruited bassist Tim Lee and McNair on drums in March 1990. Lee left the band after a brief tenure and was replaced by Shannon Mulvaney, whom Morris met at a record store. The musicians named themselves Homemade Sister after a line from the film Baby Doll and released their first single—"Rip the Wreck"/"Merry"—on Safety Net Records in 1990. Displeased with their name, the band was briefly renamed Swell, before they found out a San Francisco band had the same name and then billed themselves as Swell Dopa.

In 1990—while named Swell—they made their public debut at a show in Athens that Michael Stipe attended. He approached the band afterward and offered to produce some demos for them in John Keane's Athens studio in December. Their first high-profile show was at the July 1991 New York New Music Seminar along with three other bands that were introduced by Stipe. At that event, Morris gave out two demo tapes—one to American rock journalist James Sullivan and the other to Tom Engelshoven and John van Luyn of the Dutch music magazine Muziekkrant OOR. The band proceeded to pass the tape to a promoter in The Netherlands who gave the band some club dates as well as a spot at the side stage of the 1991 Rotterdam festival Ein Abend in Wien. After the positive response they received, they were promoted to the main stage the next day. In The Netherlands, Magnapop was signed to Play It Again Sam Records, who released the Sugarland EP and Magnapop demo album in 1992. Their self-titled first album included four of the 1990 Stipe demos, and was released on Caroline Records in the United States. A music video for the single "Merry" was shot and aired in Europe.

Magnapop was featured on a variety of various artist compilations. Their first commercial recording other than their independent single was their 1992 cover version of "Pleasant Valley Sunday" for Here No Evil – A Tribute to The Monkees. The band was also featured on other various artist tribute albums, including "Ear" (a different recording from the one on Magnapop) for Delicacy & Nourishment – Lyrics by Ernest Noyes Brookings Vol. 3 in 1992 and 1993's recording of "Every Grain of Sand" for Outlaws Blues Volume Two – A Tribute to Bob Dylan with violinist Mamie Fike. The band also recorded the Kiss My Mouth EP with Ted Niceley and released it in Europe. Around this time, the band was so fraught from booking recording sessions, that they briefly considered breaking up.

Magnapop established their fan base in the early 1990s through touring and the festival circuit—particularly in central Europe, where they first broke through to the mainstream. It was only after they had established a fan base in Europe and received positive press in the United Kingdom that the band first became recognized in the United States, including their native Atlanta. By the end of 1992, they were getting positive write-ups in American press such as The New York Times and supported Juliana Hatfield on tour. The group made appearances at Rocking Kolonia Festival in Maastricht in 1992, Pukkelpop in 1992, Transmusicales in 1992, A Campingflight to Lowlands Paradise in 1993, and the Reading Festival in 1993. They also recorded a John Peel session on September 2, 1993 and a Black Session on February 25, 1994.

=== Mainstream success (1994–1997) ===
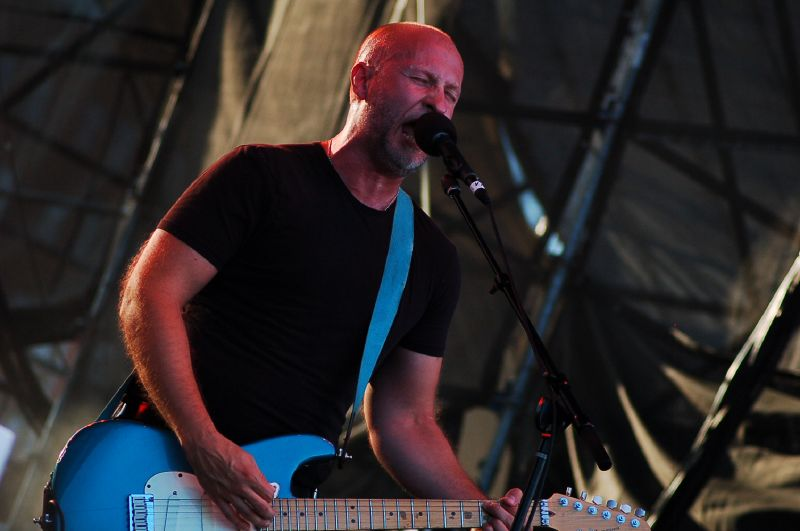

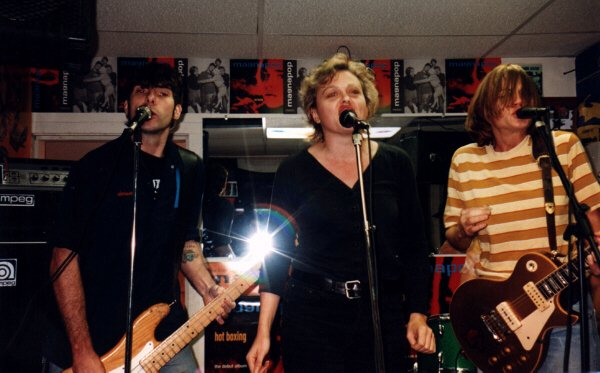
Bob Mould (above, pictured performing in 2005) produced the band's breakthrough album Hot Boxing; they can be seen promoting the album with an in-store performance from 1994 (below)

Bob Mould of Hüsker Dü had seen the band at a show in New York City's CBGB as well as in Rotterdam—he called the latter show their "turning point"—and invited the band to tour with his new group Sugar in Europe and the United States in 1992–1993. The band asked Sugar bassist and fellow Athens musician David Barbe to produce their major label debut album. When he refused, Mould offered to record with the band, taking them to Pedernales Recording Studio, in Austin, Texas in August 1993. The sessions would result in the album Hot Boxing, which was released by Play It Again Sam in Europe and Priority Records domestically on July 5, 1994. Releasing an album by Magnapop was a radical departure for Priority who had previously focused on rap music.

The album produced two singles: "Slowly, Slowly", which spent seven weeks on the charts, peaking on September 10, 1994, at 25 on the U.S. Modern Rock Tracks, and "Lay It Down", which topped the 1993 De Afrekening poll. The band toured the United States supporting The Lemonheads in 1993 and played at the 1994 Phoenix Festival and Marktrock to promote the album and created music videos for "Lay It Down", "Slowly, Slowly", and "Texas". The promotional EP Big Bright Cherry was released in 1994 and included three tracks from the Hot Boxing recording sessions as well as three self-produced songs.

In 1995, McNair and the band parted ways, with neither party giving a definitive rationale. Hopper explained "We had a hard time recording Hot Boxing, because our drummer had a lot of things in the way ... Nobody wants to hurt anyone, or to cut them out, but it was just like four adults getting a divorce, and their child is the band." She has alternately explained that the split was due to the "alternative lifestyles" of McNair and the rest of the group and that McNair's musicianship was not as competent as the other members. The remaining trio recruited session drummer Josh Freese and engineers Sandy Solomon and Bernie Zwass to record a cover of Tom Waits' "Christmas Card from a Hooker in Minneapolis" at Plus Four Recordings Studios, in Sherman Oaks, California in June 1995 for the compilation album Step Right Up: The Songs of Tom Waits. Freese joined the group in November–December of that year in Los Angeles, California to record Rubbing Doesn't Help. Mould was unavailable, so the band relocated to Los Angeles and worked with producer Geza X at his home studio in attempt to make a more "eclectic" album that would represent the diversity of their songwriting. After hearing some demos, the band decided to hire him to produce the actual album and moved to Los Angeles for recording. The album produced the singles "Open the Door" and "This Family" (the former also had a music video), as well as the EP Fire All Your Guns at Once. The band immediately set out to tour in promotion.

Los Angeles musician Mark Posgay auditioned for the band in 1995 and became the group's permanent drummer. In July of that year, Magnapop supported R.E.M. on their Monster World Tour and continued playing in the United States and Europe, including an appearance at X-Fest in 1996. They also played their first dates in Australia and Japan in 1996 and hosted 120 Minutes on July 7 of the same year. In late 1996, Mulvaney left the group, citing problems of distance—Hopper and Morris had relocated permanently to Los Angeles—as well as a desire to focus on his family. He continued playing bass guitar and stand-up bass with Atlanta groups The Hots, The Lugosis, and Anna Kramer & The Lost Cause. Boston native and former Queers bassist Greg Urbaitis replaced him after replying to an ad in The Recycler and the band continued to play live shows through 1997, including supporting Throwing Muses on their farewell tour. Posgay quit that summer and he was replaced by former Lifter drummer Johnny Rozas and this line-up recorded six demos at a recording studio in Orange County. This version of the band was short-lived as Magnapop was informed while on tour that their record label's rock division ceased to exist and they did not have any funding for future touring or recording. Compounding matters further, the band members were still under contract to their old record label and were legally disbarred from using the name "Magnapop" until their contract expired seven years later.

=== Hiatus, reformation, and independent releases (since 1998) ===
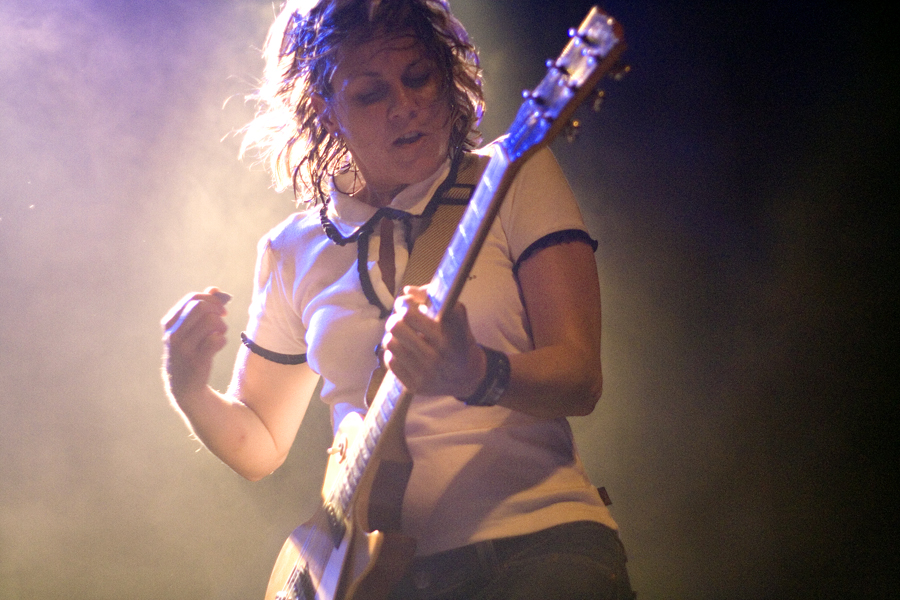
Linda Hopper and Ruthie Morris re-formed Magnapop in 2002 to record and tour. Morris is pictured here performing with the band in Belgium on April 21, 2006.

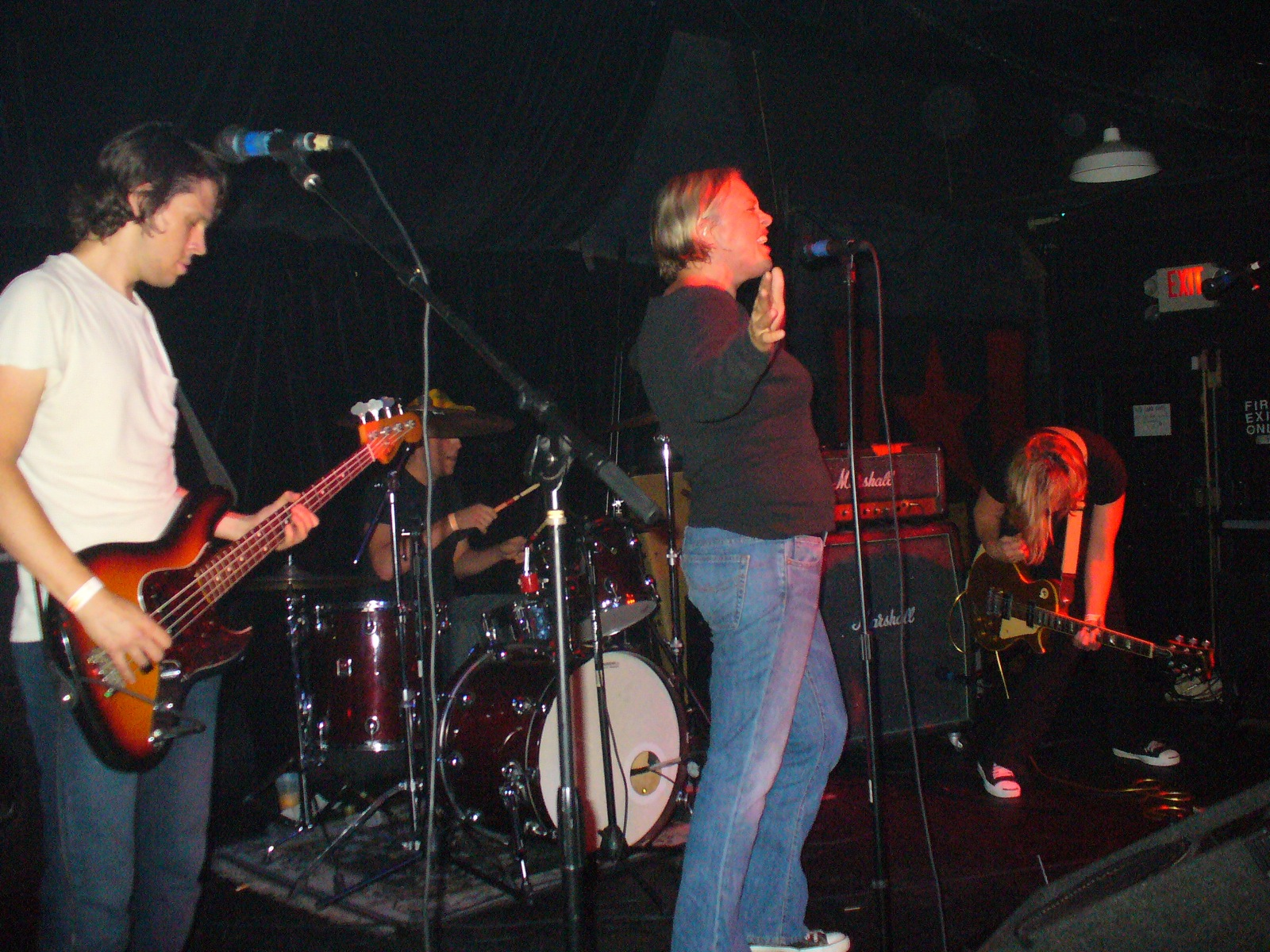
The re-formed Magnapop performing in 2007. From left to right: Scott Rowe, Chad Williams, Linda Hopper, and Ruthie Morris

Hopper and Morris continued to play a few acoustic live shows as a duo into 1999, occasionally with accompaniment (such as Philadelphia bassist Billy Warburton and drummer Lance Crow) and attempted to record an EP for record label Vital Cog with a drum machine as backing, but ended up putting Magnapop on an indefinite hiatus. During this time, Morris also moved to Seattle, where she recorded a 2002 single with drummer Curtis Hall as The New Candidates. Hopper, Morris, Hall, and a group of Seattle musicians also demoed some Hopper/Morris songs during this period. Hall would also drum with Hopper, Morris, and Mulvaney for a few Magnapop shows in 2002–2003. The band officially re-formed in 2003 with bassist Scott Rowe and drummer Brian Fletcher to tour the European festival circuit and record an album. In The Netherlands, Hopper also performed vocals on R.E.M.'s cover of "Favorite Writer" at two of the group's concerts on June 21 and 22.

The following May, the band entered Zero Return Studios in Atlanta with drummer Curt Wells as producer for their first album in almost a decade. On January 25, 2005, Magnapop released Mouthfeel on Amy Ray's record label Daemon Records and supported it with a tour through the United States. By 2005, Fletcher had left the group, and drummer Chad Williams had been recruited to replace him on two weeks prior to the first show on the Mouthfeel tour that included an appearance at South by Southwest. One of these performances was recorded for the band's first live album—Magnapop Live at Maxwell's 03/09/2005—which they released independently through online music distributors including eMusic, the iTunes Store, and Rhapsody. In May 2006, the band completed a tour of Belgium and The Netherlands and returned to Atlanta to begin work on the followup to Mouthfeel. They continued touring Europe in 2007 and completed writing and recording for a new album sometime prior to 2008, with the album initially slated to be released in summer 2009. These sessions recorded with Brian Paulson were released as Chase Park on September 4, 2009, through digital distributors by the band's own, newly created label, The Kraft Records.

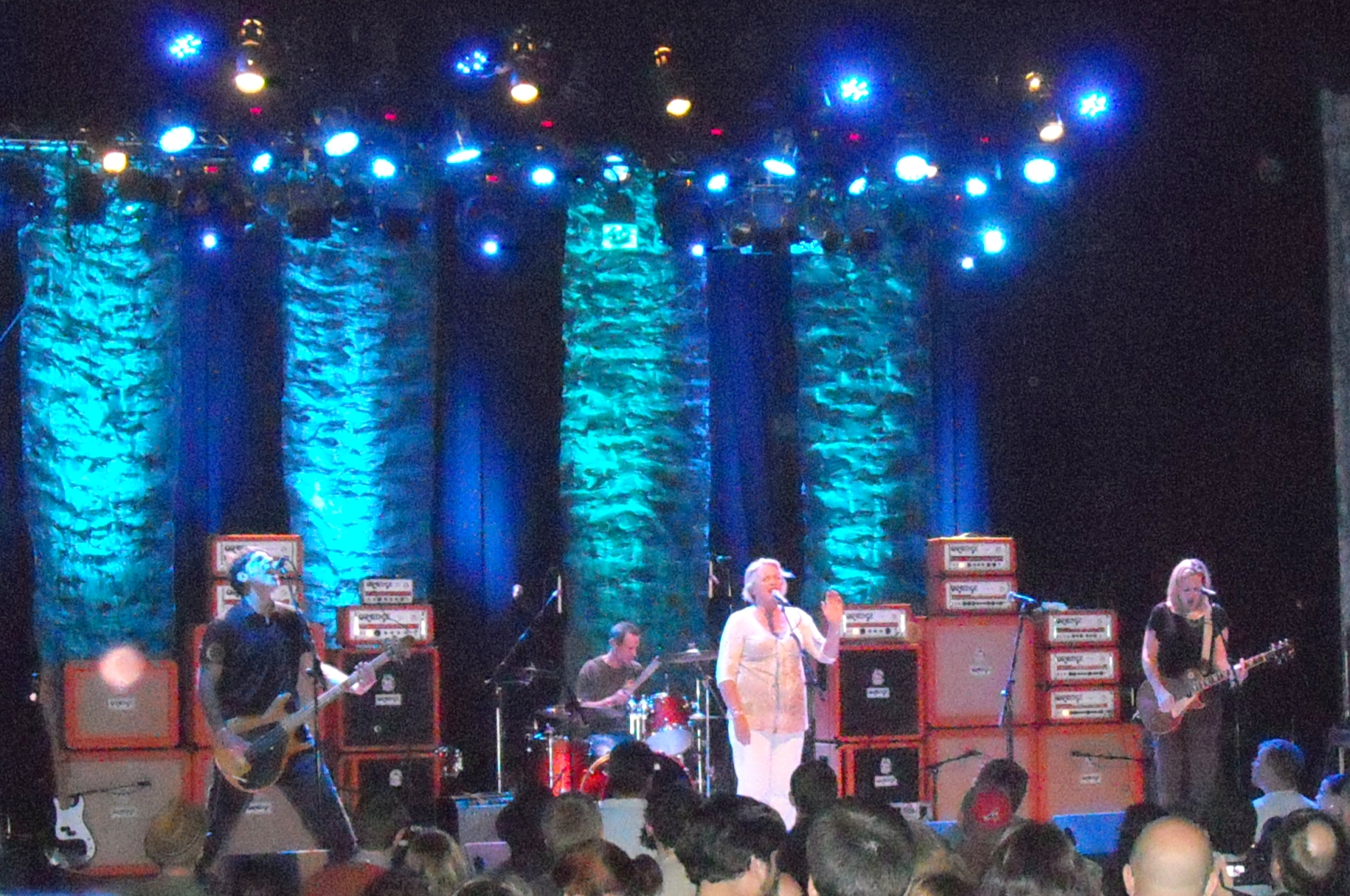
The original line-up of Magnapop reunited for a benefit concert for record store Criminal Records in 2011. From left to right: bassist Shannon Mulvaney, drummer David McNair, singer Linda Hopper, and guitarist Ruthie Morris.

The band has continued to intermittently tour since the release of Chase Park and on September 13, 2011, Creative Loafing announced that Mulvaney had attempted to re-form the original line-up of Magnapop to perform a benefit concert for local independent music store Criminal Records. The benefit was later scheduled for October 15, and the band announced that they would be performing their self-titled debut album in its entirety, along with some songs from Hot Boxing. Mulvaney was motivated to support Criminal due to the store carrying their early releases in the Atlanta area. The original line-up became permanent after the 2011 reunion.

Between touring with Magnapop, bassist Scott Rowe also performed in Luigi from 2003 through 2008 with former Magnapop drummer Brian Fletcher as well as Bad Magic Number with current drummer Williams. The former has released two albums—2003's Vamonos and Found on the Forest Floor in 2005. Williams began drumming for Dead Register in 2014.

In September 2016, Magnapop announced a February 2017 tour of Belgium, the Netherlands, and the UK, accompanied by the album The Circle Is Round, released in 2019.

The band announced a tour of Belgium and the Netherlands in November 2021; these dates were rescheduled from 2020, when COVID-19 restrictions forced their postponement.

== Musical style ==
Magnapop is kind of like Young Marble Giants backed by AC/DC.

— Michael Stipe, 1992

Slowly, Slowly
The chorus of "Slowly, Slowly" is illustrative of Ruthie Morris' aggressive guitar playing and the harmony of her backing vocals with lead vocalist Linda Hopper. This song became their first charting single—reaching 25 on Billboard's Modern Rock Tracks.

Magnapop have been defined genre-wise as power pop by multiple rock critics, and their performances have drawn comparisons with punk, new wave, and surf rock. Reviewers have commented on the band's pop-influenced songwriting, specifically their employment of guitar hooks and simple chord structure. To that end, they have been compared to Mould's previous work as a member of Sugar and Hüsker Dü, as well as fellow Georgia-based rock acts such as Guadalcanal Diary and Let's Active and alternative rock pioneers Pixies and The Replacements. The album Rubbing Doesn't Help represented a stylistic shift for the band away from their more pop-inspired material toward more guitar-oriented rock, but their comeback with Mouthfeel returned to the more pop-inspired sound of Hot Boxing.

Morris is known for her particularly aggressive guitar-playing and its interaction with Linda Hopper's pop-influenced vocals. In addition, the vocal harmony between the two singers has defined the band's sound, especially on later releases such as Rubbing Doesn't Help that feature more of Morris' vocals. Critics have compared Morris' guitar-playing to punk acts like Johnny Ramone of Ramones as well as alternative rock musicians such as Johnny Marr.

== Covers and tributes ==
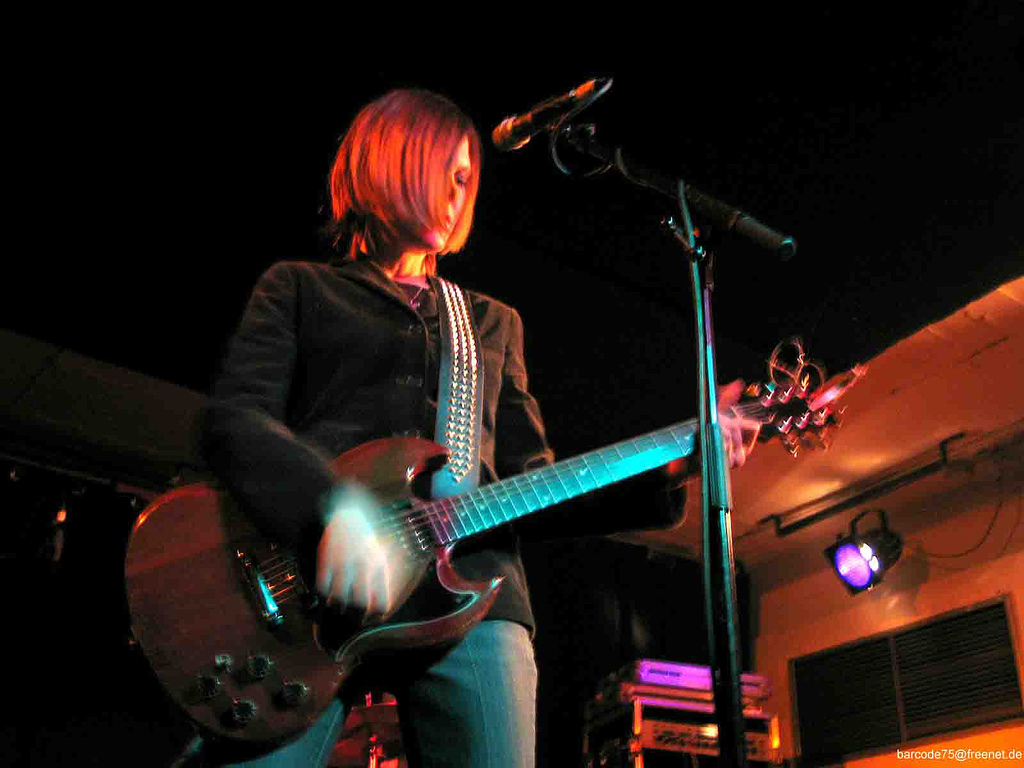
Juliana Hatfield—pictured here performing in 2006—toured with Magnapop and was inspired to write a song about Ruthie Morris' guitar playing.

"Open the Door" has been covered by Eels as the B-side to "Flyswatter"—it would later be collected on Useless Trinkets: B-Sides, Soundtracks, Rarities and Unreleased 1996–2006. Eels performed the song several times on their Electro-Shock Blues Show tour in support of the album Electro-Shock Blues. Karaoke versions of the song were released by Stingray Digital through the iTunes Store on January 15, 2008. "Favorite Writer" was covered by R.E.M. as a B-side to "Bad Day" in 2003 and was played live during the 2003 tour to promote In Time: The Best of R.E.M. 1988–2003.

In 1993, Juliana Hatfield wrote "Ruthless" in honor of the band's guitarist after the two had a conversation about Camille Paglia while touring in 1992 ("We're all gushin', but I swear we really mean it, man/We're all sucking up to Ruthie.") It appeared as a B-side on the Juliana Hatfield Three singles "Spin the Bottle" and "My Sister".

== Band members ==
- Linda Hopper – lead vocals
- Ruthie Morris – backing vocals, guitar
- David McNair – drums
- Shannon Mulvaney – bass guitar

Magnapop line-ups
Homemade Sister (1989)	Linda Hopper – vocals; Ruthie Morris – guitar
Homemade Sister (1989–1990)	Linda Hopper – vocals; Tim Lee – bass guitar; David McNair – drums; Ruthie Morris – guitar
Homemade Sister/Swell/ Swell Dopa/Magnapop (1990–1995)	Linda Hopper – vocals; David McNair – drums; Ruthie Morris – guitar; Shannon Mulvaney – bass guitar
Magnapop (1995)	Linda Hopper – vocals; Shannon Mulvaney – bass guitar; Ruthie Morris – guitar; with: Josh Freese – session drums
Magnapop (1996–1997)	Linda Hopper – vocals; Ruthie Morris – guitar; Shannon Mulvaney – bass guitar; Mark Posgay – drums
Magnapop (1997)	Linda Hopper – vocals; Ruthie Morris – guitar; Mark Posgay – drums; Greg Urbaitis – bass guitar
Magnapop (1997)	Linda Hopper – vocals; Ruthie Morris – guitar; Johnny Rozas – drums; Greg Urbaitis – bass guitar
Hiatus (1997–2002)	Linda and Ruthie make occasional performances together, and plan but cancel a tour and EP in 1999
Magnapop (2002)	Linda Hopper – vocals; Ruthie Morris – guitar; Shannon Mulvaney – bass guitar; with: Curtis Hall – drums
Magnapop (2002–2004)	Brian Fletcher – drums; Linda Hopper – vocals; Ruthie Morris – guitar; Shannon Mulvaney – bass guitar
Magnapop (2004)	Brian Fletcher – drums; Linda Hopper – vocals; Scott Rowe – bass guitar; Ruthie Morris – guitar
Magnapop (2004–mid 2010s)	Linda Hopper – vocals; Ruthie Morris – guitar; Scott Rowe – bass guitar; Chad Williams – drums
Magnapop reunion (2011, 2017–present)	Linda Hopper – vocals; David McNair – drums; Ruthie Morris – guitar; Shannon Mulvaney – bass guitar

== Discography ==
- Magnapop (1992)
- Hot Boxing (1994)
- Rubbing Doesn't Help (1996)
- Mouthfeel (2005)
- Chase Park (2009)
- The Circle Is Round (2019)

== See also ==
- Magnapop discography
- List of Magnapop band members
- List of songs recorded by Magnapop
- Oh-OK
- The Complete Recordings (Oh-OK album)
- Music of Athens, Georgia
- Daemon Records
