= Magnapop Live at Maxwell's 03/09/2005 =

Live album by Magnapop
- Released: September 3, 2005
- Recorded: September 3, 2005, Maxwell's, Atlanta, Georgia, United States
- Genre: Pop punk, pop rock, power pop
- Length: 47:46
- Language: English
- Label: Self-released

Magnapop chronology
Mouthfeel (2005)	Magnapop Live at Maxwell's 03/09/2005 (2005)	Chase Park (2009)

Magnapop Live at Maxwell's 03/09/2005 is a 2005 live album by Magnapop, released through online music providers including eMusic, the iTunes Store, and Rhapsody.

== Track listing ==
All songs written by Linda Hopper and Ruthie Morris, except where noted

1. "I Don't Care" – 4:27
2. "We're Faded" – 2:17
3. "Smile 4u" – 2:36
4. "Slowly, Slowly" – 3:40
5. "Get It Right" – 2:11
6. "Satellite" – 3:15
7. "California" – 4:31
8. "Pretend I'm There" – 3:13
9. "PDX" – 2:19
10. "Future Forward" (Hopper, Morris, and Scott Rowe) – 3:22
11. "Game of Pricks" (Robert Pollard) – 1:59
12. "Stick to Me" – 2:55
13. "The In-Between" – 3:57
14. "Merry" – 3:15
15. "Open the Door" – 3:49

== Personnel ==
- Linda Hopper – lead vocals
- Ruthie Morris – guitar, backing vocals
- Scott Rowe – bass guitar
- Chad Williams – drums
