= Lay It Down (Magnapop song) =

Single by Magnapop

Single by Magnapop

from the album Hot Boxing
- A-side: "Lay It Down"
- B-side: "Slowly, Slowly"; "The Crush"; "Piece of Cake"
- Released: 1994
- Recorded: August 1993
- Studio: Pedernales Recording (Spicewood, Texas); Bosstown (Atlanta, Georgia) (mixing)
- Genre: Pop punk
- Length: 3:03
- Label: Play It Again Sam
- Songwriter(s): Linda Hopper, Ruthie Morris
- Producer(s): Bob Mould

Magnapop singles chronology
"Slowly, Slowly" (1994)	"Lay It Down" (1994)	"Open the Door" (1996)

Promotional cover

Audio sample
- The chorus of "Lay It Down" is emblematic of Magnapop's combination of aggressive guitar mixed with pop-influenced harmony vocals.: file; help

"Lay It Down" is a 1994 single by Magnapop from the album Hot Boxing, released by Play It Again Sam Records on CD (catalogue number 450.0267.22 - BIAS 267 CD) and 12" gramophone record (450.0267.30 - BIAS 267.) A promo CD edition was released by Priority Records as DPRO 50820. A live recording of the song appears on the German edition of 2005's Mouthfeel and the song also appears on 1993's Kiss My Mouth. A music video was created for the song in 1994.

The song topped the De Afrekening poll in 1994.

== Track listing ==
All songs written by Linda Hopper and Ruthie Morris

1. "Lay It Down" – 3:03
2. "Slowly, Slowly" – 3:41
3. "The Crush" – 3:20
4. "Piece of Cake" – 2:48

== Personnel ==
Magnapop

- Linda Hopper – lead vocals
- David McNair – drums
- Ruthie Morris – lead guitar
- Shannon Mulvaney – bass guitar

Production staff

- David Collins – remastering at A&M Studios
- Valerie Raimonde – design
- Ruth Leitman – art direction, photography
- Bob Mould – production
- Jim Wilson – engineering
