= Rubbing Doesn't Help =

Studio album by Magnapop
- Released: May 21, 1996
- Recorded: November–December 1995
- Studio: City Lab, Los Angeles, California, United States
- Genre: Pop punk, pop rock, power pop
- Length: 41:30
- Language: English
- Label: Play It Again Sam/Priority
- Producer: Geza X

Magnapop chronology
Fire All Your Guns at Once (1996)	Rubbing Doesn't Help (1996)	Mouthfeel (2005)

Singles from Rubbing Doesn't Help
- 1. "Open the Door" Released: April 15, 1996; 2. "This Family" Released: 1996

Rubbing Doesn't Help is the third album by Magnapop, released in 1996.

== Recording ==
The sessions for Rubbing Doesn't Help were produced by Geza X at City Lab Studios in Hollywood, California, in late 1995. Drummer David McNair left the group prior to recording, so they hired session musician Josh Freese to fill in on drums. This would be the band's final album for almost a decade; their record label folded while promoting Rubbing Doesn't Help and they were contractually barred from recording under that name. The band (along with Freese) also went to Plus Four Recordings Studios, in Sherman Oaks, California, with engineers Sandy Solomon and Bernie Zwass in June 1995 to record their cover of Tom Waits's "Christmas Card from a Hooker in Minneapolis" for the compilation album Step Right Up: The Songs of Tom Waits. The title of the album comes from a Ben-Gay slogan.

== Reception ==
Professional ratings
Review scores
Source	Rating
AllMusic	3/5 stars
Blender	favorable
Boston Phoenix	favorable
Robert Christgau	(neither)
College Music Journal	favorable
Los Angeles Times	2.5/4 stars
Launch Magazine	4/5 stars
Melody Maker	favorable
Ray Gun	favorable
The Washington Post	favorable

The album received mostly positive reviews, with some mixed responses. Positive critics noted the album's emotionally powerful lyrics in addition to its aggressive instrumentation—particularly the guitar. Ambivalent reviewers criticized the lack of variety between this album and Magnapop's previous efforts, as well as a lack of focus in the production.

== Track listing ==
All songs written by Linda Hopper and Ruthie Morris, except where noted.

1. "This Family" – 3:28
2. "I Don't Care" – 2:40
3. "Open the Door" – 3:37
4. "Come On Inside" – 2:43
5. "Down on Me" – 3:24
6. "An Apology" – 3:04
7. "My Best Friend" – 3:26
8. "Juicy Fruit" – 2:18
9. "Firebrand" – 2:29
10. "Cherry Bomb" – 2:15
11. "Radio Waves" – 2:32
12. "Snake" (Hopper, Morris, and Shannon Mulvaney) – 5:00
13. "Dead Letter" – 3:32

Also includes the hidden track "Suck It Up"

Japanese edition bonus tracks

14. "Hold You Down" (New Mix) – 2:43
15. "Voice Without a Sound" – 2:41

The Dutch edition of the album has a slightly different track listing, with "Hold You Down" (3:29) as the fourth track and omitting "Cherry Bomb".

== Tracks from Rubbing Doesn't Help ==
A promotional EP entitled Tracks from Rubbing Doesn't Help was released by Play It Again Sam in the United States in 1996 (catalogue number PROMOBIAS 033 CD) with the following track listing:

1. "This Family" – 3:28
2. "An Apology" – 3:04
3. "Open the Door" – 3:37
4. "My Best Friend" – 3:26
5. "Juicy Fruit" – 2:18
6. "Snake" – 5:00

== Personnel ==
Magnapop

- Linda Hopper – lead vocals, art direction, photography
- Ruthie Morris – lead guitar, backing vocals, lead vocals on "Hold You Down" and "Suck It Up", dobro on "Dead Letter", art direction, photography
- Shannon Mulvaney – bass guitar

Additional personnel

- Jerry Finn – mixing on "Come on Inside"
- Sherry Rae Etheredge – photography
- Josh Freese – drums
- Geza X – production, engineering
- Maggie Magarian – design
- Nancy Ogami – lettering
- Eddie Shryer of Future Disc – mastering
- Art Shoji – design
- Steve Snow – sound design on "Come On Inside"
- Thom Wilson – mixing

== Release history ==
The album was initially released on Priority Records in the United States and Play It Again Sam in Europe, with the Japanese edition published by King.

Region	Date	Label	Format	Catalog
United States	March 21, 1996	Priority	Compact Disc	P2 53992
United States	March 21, 1996	Priority	cassette tape	P4 53992
Europe	March 21, 1996	Play It Again Sam	Compact Disc	450.0321.20 - BIAS 321 CD
Europe	March 21, 1996	Play It Again Sam	LP (red vinyl)	450.0321.10 - BIAS 321 LP
Australia	1996	Cortex	Compact Disc	CTX058CD
Japan	1996	King	Compact Disc	KICP 507†
The Netherlands	1996	Play It Again Sam	Compact Disc	450.0321.26 - BIAS 321 CDX

†Special edition with bonus tracks

== Sales chart performance ==
Chart (1996)	Peak position
US Top Heatseekers	22
