= Chase Park =

Studio album by Magnapop
- Released: September 4, 2009
- Recorded: February 2008
- Studio: Chase Park Transduction, Athens, Georgia, United States
- Genre: Pop punk; pop rock; power pop
- Length: 38:26
- Language: English
- Label: The Kraft Records
- Producer: Brian Paulson

Magnapop chronology
Magnapop Live at Maxwell's 03/09/2005 (2005)	Chase Park (2009)	The Circle Is Round (2019)

Chase Park is the fifth studio album from Magnapop, released on September 4, 2009. The recording is the first from the band released independently on the vanity label The Kraft Records. Lead songwriters Linda Hopper and Ruthie Morris began writing for the album after they ceased touring for Mouthfeel in 2006 and the track "Future Forward" debuted on the 2005 live album Magnapop Live at Maxwell's 03/09/2005.

The album was initially distributed digitally through online retailers without a physical format release in 2009. In the 2009 Georgia floods, Morris lost much of her musical equipment, Magnapop memorabilia, and the first Compact Disc pressing of Chase Park. Atlanta musicians—including former Magnapop bandmate Tim Lee and Amy Ray—threw a benefit concert to assist her in replacing her losses on December 15, 2009. On March 30, 2010, the album was put out on Compact Disc with an additional track: the Spiderbait cover "Jesus".

Muziekkrant OOR's positive review of the album called the music "unpretentious and disarming."

== Track listing ==
All songs written by Linda Hopper and Ruthie Morris, except where noted

2009 digital version

1. "Bring It to Me" – 2:13
2. "Straight to You" – 2:42
3. "Q-Tip" – 1:58
4. "Lions and Lambs" – 2:29
5. "Blue Cheer" – 2:59
6. "Feedback Blues" – 3:24
7. "Looking for Ghosts" – 3:10
8. "Bangkok" – 3:18
9. "Evergleam" – 3:00
10. "Future Forward" (Hopper, Morris, and Scott Rowe) – 2:46
11. "Need More" – 3:34

2010 Compact Disc version

6. "Jesus" (Janet English, Mark Maher, and Damian Whitty) – 1:53

The rest of the track listing is identical to the digital release.

== Personnel ==
Magnapop

- Linda Hopper – lead vocals
- Ruthie Morris – guitar, backing vocals
- Scott Rowe – bass guitar
- Chad Williams – drums and photography

Additional personnel

- Guy Burwell – illustration
- Karin Heckl – design
- Brian Paulson – production and mixing
- Sandra Lee Phipps – photography
- Carl Saff – mastering
