= The Circle Is Round =

Studio album by Magnapop
- Released: September 27, 2019
- Recorded: 1992 (demos), 2018 (new material)
- Studio: Furies Studios in Marietta, Georgia, United States
- Genre: Alternative rock; pop punk
- Length: 33:26
- Language: English
- Label: Happy Happy Birthday to Me
- Producer: Ed Burdell

Magnapop chronology
Chase Park (2009)	The Circle Is Round (2019)

The Circle Is Round is the sixth studio album by American alternative rock/pop punk band Magnapop.

== Reception ==
For Clash, Will Fitzpatrick gave the album seven out of 10. The editorial staff of AllMusic Guide gave the release 3.5 out of five stars, with reviewer Heather Phares, writing that the band sounds as good as ever and of this music, "all of this looking back never feels too bogged down by nostalgia, even when they revisit their earliest days".

== Track listing ==
All songs written by Linda Hopper and Ruthie Morris

1. "Dog on the Door" – 3:18
2. "Change Your Hair" – 2:44
3. "A Simple Plan" – 3:28
4. "Super Size Me" – 3:05
5. "Need to Change" – 2:11
6. "What Can I Do" – 2:51
7. "Rain Rain" – 3:38
8. "Disabled" – 3:52
9. "Rip the Wreck" – 2:53
10. "Leo" (Demo) – 3:00
11. "Pretty Awful" (Demo) – 2:26

== Personnel ==
Magnapop

- Linda Hopper – vocals
- David McNair – drums
- Ruthie Morris – guitar, vocals
- Shannon Mulvaney – bass guitar, vocals

Additional personnel

- Ed Burdell – guitars, production
- Vyvyan Hughes – photography
- Bruce King – keyboards
- Henry Owings – design
- Jeffrey Shipman – photography
