= Fire All Your Guns at Once =

- Cover to the general international release

EP by Magnapop
- Released: January 1996
- Recorded: November–December 1995, City Lab Recording, Los Angeles, California, United States
- Genre: Pop punk, pop rock, power pop
- Length: 12:11
- Language: English
- Label: SideOneDummy
- Producer: Geza X

Magnapop chronology
Hot Boxing (1994)	Fire All Your Guns at Once (1996)	Rubbing Doesn't Help (1996)

Magnapop EPs chronology
Big Bright Cherry (1994)	Fire All Your Guns at Once (1996)

American cover
- Cover to the limited edition American release

Fire All Your Guns at Once is a 1996 EP by Magnapop released in the United Kingdom by Play It Again Sam Records on Compact Disc (catalogue number 450.0287.22 - BIAS 287 CD) and 7" gramophone record (450.0287.40 - BIAS 287-7.) In the United States, it was issued by SideOneDummy Records on purple vinyl (603967000979) on April 1, 1998, and as a promotional Compact Disc by Priority Records (DPRO 30039) in 1996. Two of these tracks are also featured on their studio album Rubbing Doesn't Help.

== Reception ==
The EP received favorable reviews from the College Music Journal, Melody Maker, and Metro Silicon Valley.

== Track listing ==
All songs written by Linda Hopper and Ruthie Morris

1. "Come on Inside" – 2:58
2. "Hold You Down" – 3:14
3. "Voice Without a Sound" – 2:41
4. "Down on Me" – 3:18

== Personnel ==
Magnapop

- Linda Hopper – lead vocals
- Ruthie Morris – guitar, backing vocals
- Shannon Mulvaney – bass guitar

Additional personnel

- Jerry Finn – mixing on "Come on Inside"
- Josh Freese – drums
- Geza X – production
- Eddie Shryer of Future Disc – mastering
- Steve Snow – sound design on "Come On Inside"
