= Christmas Card from a Hooker in Minneapolis =

Song by Tom Waits

from the album Blue Valentine
- Released: September 1978
- Recorded: July 24 – August 26, 1978
- Studio: Filmways/Heider Recording; Hollywood, California
- Genre: Jazz, blues
- Length: 4:33
- Label: Asylum
- Songwriter: Tom Waits
- Producer: Bones Howe

"Christmas Card from a Hooker in Minneapolis" is a song written and performed by Tom Waits, released on his 1978 album Blue Valentine.

== Lyrics ==
"Christmas Card from a Hooker in Minneapolis" has been described as a "laconic first-person sketch". The lyrics are in the form a letter from a prostitute to a man named Charlie. She reveals that she is pregnant, that she has quit alcohol and drugs, describes her current living circumstances (including her stable relationship with a new husband who promises to raise her arriving baby like he would his own son), and outlines the better choices she would make if she "still had all the money we used to spend on dope". At the song's conclusion, the author confesses to Charlie that she has been lying to him; she does not have a husband, but will "be eligible for parole come Valentine's Day."

== Personnel ==
- Tom Waits – lead vocal, acoustic piano
- Da Willie Gonga (George Duke) – electric grand piano

== Live performances ==
In the late 1970s, Waits often performed "Christmas Card from a Hooker in Minneapolis" as a medley with "Goin' Out Of My Head," originally recorded by Little Anthony & the Imperials and mentioned in the lyrics, and the Christmas carol "Silent Night".

For a performance in New York on November 21, 1985, Waits introduced the song with the following anecdote:

I was in Minneapolis – it was 200 degrees below zero – I know, you think I'm bullshitting, no, I swear to God, I was wearing just a bra and a slip and a kind of dead squirrel around my neck – he was colder than I was. The police cars would go by and they'd wave ... merry Xmas, merry Xmas, merry Xmas ... anyway, I got caught in the middle of a pimp war between two kids in Chinchilla coats, they couldn't have been more than 13 years old. They're throwing knives and forks and spoons out into the street – it was deep – so I grabbed a ladle, and Dinah Washington was singing "Our Day Will Come" and I knew that was it.

== Reception ==
Denise Sullivan, writing for AllMusic, described "Christmas Card from a Hooker in Minneapolis" as "one of Tom Waits' most beloved songs from one of his more obscure albums ... The song showcases Waits playing a barroom piano melody, weaving words together -- in essence, doing what he does best in one long, bittersweet song."

Alexander Heigl of PopMatters placed "Christmas Card From a Hooker in Minneapolis" first on his list of the fifteen best Tom Waits songs: "There are more creative Tom Waits songs ... but there aren’t quite as many that can utterly devastate a room full of people with quite the same slurred, finely-detailed aplomb. For maximum tears in your bourbon, watch [the] live version, which features a bedraggled interpolation of 'Silent Night' and Waits’ rendition of that Little Anthony and the Imperials record. The audience laughs a bit at some of the lyrical gems, but after that final verse, you can hear a pin drop." It ranked fourth on The Guardian's list of the top ten Tom Waits songs: "This hooker with a heart of gold narrative is certainly less patronising than most, a darkly funny scenario that also stirs in us a sense of pity. There’s a twist in the tale, naturally, from one of music’s great raconteurs."

== Cover versions ==
"Christmas Card from a Hooker in Minneapolis" has been covered by a number of notable artists, among them Interzone in 1981, Magnapop in 1995 for Step Right Up: The Songs of Tom Waits, Kacey Jones in 2000, Wolfgang Ambros in 2000, David Broza in 2001, and Aslan in 2005. Neko Case's cover version, featured on the Tom Waits tribute album New Coat of Paint (2002), received critical praise. Denise Sullivan, writing for AllMusic, wrote that "her fragile but tough delivery, accompanied by "church" organ gave the song a whole new kitschy, "hooker with a heart of gold" dimension."
