= Magnapop (album) =

- Cover of the album

Demo album by Magnapop
- Released: October 16, 1992
- Recorded: December 1990 (John Keane Studio) and March 1992 (Furies Studio)
- Studios: John Keane, Atlanta, Georgia, United States; Furies, Marietta, Georgia, United States
- Genres: Pop punk, pop rock, power pop
- Length: 24:07
- Language: English
- Label: Caroline
- Producers: Magnapop; Michael Stipe
- Compiler: Magnapop

Magnapop chronology
Sugarland (1992)	Magnapop (1992)	Hot Boxing (1994)

Singles from Magnapop
- 1. "Merry"/"Complicated" Released: 1992

Magnapop is the debut album by Magnapop, released in 1992 and re-released with bonus tracks on July 29, 1997.

== Recording and release ==
Four of the tracks—"Favorite Writer", "Chemical", "Complicated", and "Merry"—were recorded in John Keane Studio, Athens, Georgia in December 1990 with Linda Hopper's friend Michael Stipe producing. (The band also recorded the song "Texas", but subsequently re-recorded it for their first proper studio album, Hot Boxing.) The rest were self-recorded through March 1992 at Furies Studio in Atlanta suburb Marietta. The album produced one single—"Merry"/"Complicated"—released as a 7" on Solid Records (catalogue number 527.9013.40); a music video for the song was created in 1992.

The song "Favorite Writer" would later be covered by R.E.M. for their 2003 single "Bad Day" and during their 2003 tour to support In Time: The Best of R.E.M. 1988–2003. On September 13, 2011, Creative Loafing announced that Mulvaney had attempted to re-form the original line-up of Magnapop to perform a benefit concert for local independent music store Criminal Records. The benefit was later scheduled for October 15, and the band announced that they would be performing their self-titled debut album in its entirety.

Two songs from this session would end up on the 2019 release The Circle Is Round.

== Reception ==
Professional ratings
Review scores
Source	Rating
AllMusic	4/5 stars
Pitchfork Media	6.4/10

The album received a positive review from AllMusic, with reviewer Heather Phares labeling their cover version of Big Star's "Thirteen" "a welcome addition to this good beginning." Pitchfork Media's review was more ambivalent, characterizing the album as "some impressive work for so early in their career" but hampered by minimal production and the price of a full-length album for only 25 minutes of music.

== Track listing ==
All songs written by Linda Hopper and Ruthie Morris, except where noted.

Side one

1. "Garden" – 2:21
2. "Guess" – 2:53
3. "Ear" (Ernest Noyes Brookings, Linda Hopper, and Ruthie Morris) – 2:21
4. "13" (Chris Bell and Alex Chilton of Big Star) – 2:42
5. "Spill It" – 2:48

Side two

6. "Chemical" – 3:31
7. "Favorite Writer" – 2:56
8. "Complicated" – 1:52
9. "Merry" – 3:04

Re-release bonus tracks

10. "Snake" (Demo) (Hopper, Morris, Shannon Mulvaney) – 5:45
11. "Skinburns" (Demo) – 4:03

== Personnel ==
Magnapop

- Linda Hopper – lead vocals
- David McNair – drums
- Ruthie Morris – guitar, backing vocals
- Shannon Mulvaney – bass guitar, backing vocals

Technical staff

- Ed Burdell – engineering on "Garden", "Guess", "Ear", "13", and "Spill It"
- Magnapop – production on "Garden", "Guess", "Ear", "13", "Spill It", "Snake", and "Skinburns"
- Michael Stipe – production on "Chemical", "Favorite Writer", "Complicated", and "Merry"

== Release history ==
The album was initially released on Caroline Records in the United States and Play It Again Sam/Priority Records in the United Kingdom, with later editions published by Solid (The Netherlands) and King (Japan); the re-release with bonus tracks was published in the United States by Never.

Region	Date	Label	Format	Catalog
United States	October 16, 1992	Caroline	Compact Disc	BIAS 220-2
United Kingdom	October 16, 1992	Play It Again Sam/Priority Records	Compact Disc	450.0220.21 - BIAS 220 CD
United Kingdom	October 16, 1992	Play It Again Sam/Priority Records	cassette tape	450.0220.53 - BIAS 220 MC
The Netherlands	October 16, 1992	Play It Again Sam/Priority Records	LP	450.0220.11 - BIAS 220
The Netherlands	October 16, 1992	Solid	Compact Disc	527.9017.20
Japan	1992	King	Compact Disc	KICP-407
United States	1997	Never	Compact Disc	NR2202†

†Re-release with bonus tracks
