= This Family =

Single by Magnapop

Single by Magnapop

from the album Rubbing Doesn't Help
- A-side: "This Family" (Mark Freegard Remix)
- B-side: "This Family"
- Released: 1996
- Recorded: November–December 1995, City Lab Recording, Los Angeles, California, United States
- Genre: Pop punk
- Length: 3:28
- Label: Play It Again Sam
- Songwriters: Linda Hopper, Ruthie Morris
- Producer: Geza X

Magnapop singles chronology
"Open the Door" (1996)	"This Family" (1996)

Audio sample
- The chorus, describing the conflicted emotions of the narrator.: file; help

"This Family" is a 1996 single by Magnapop by Play It Again Sam Records on CD (catalogue number 450.0307.24 - BIAS 307 CD.)

== Track listing ==
All songs written by Linda Hopper and Ruthie Morris

1. "This Family" (Mark Freegard Remix) – 3:28
2. "This Family" – 3:28

== Personnel ==
Magnapop

- Linda Hopper – lead vocals, art direction, photography
- Ruthie Morris – lead guitar, backing vocals, art direction, photography
- Shannon Mulvaney – bass guitar

Additional personnel

- Josh Freese – drums
- Geza X – production, engineering
- Eddie Shryer of Future Disc – mastering
