= Open the Door (Magnapop song) =

Single by Magnapop

from the album Rubbing Doesn't Help
- A-side: "Open the Door"
- B-side: "True Love"; "Re-hab"
- Released: April 15, 1996
- Recorded: November–December 1995
- Studio: City Lab Recording, Los Angeles, California, United States
- Genre: Pop punk
- Length: 3:38
- Label: Play It Again Sam
- Songwriters: Linda Hopper; Ruthie Morris
- Producer: Geza X

Magnapop singles chronology
"Lay It Down" (1994)	"Open the Door" (1996)	"This Family" (1996)

Promotional cover

Audio sample
- The chorus, urging a friend to live.: file; help

"Open the Door" is a 1996 single by Magnapop released by Play It Again Sam Records as a CD maxi-single, two-track CD and 7" on red viny . A promotional CD and 10" were released by Priority Records. Live recordings of the song appear on the German edition of 2005's Mouthfeel and the live album Magnapop Live at Maxwell's 03/09/2005. A music video was created for the song in 1996.

The song chronicle's songwriters Linda Hopper and Ruthie Morris's struggle with the deaths of mutual acquaintances. The music video for the song was censored by MTV for its depiction of drug abuse.

== Track listing ==
All songs written by Linda Hopper and Ruthie Morris

=== CD ===
1. "Open the Door" – 3:38
2. "True Love" – 1:56
3. "Re-Hab" – 2:37

=== 7" ===
1. "Open the Door" – 3:38
2. "Re-Hab" – 2:37

=== Promotional CD and 10" ===
1. "Open the Door" (Edit) – 3:20
2. "Open the Door" – 3:36

== Personnel ==
=== Magnapop ===
- Linda Hopper – lead vocals
- Ruthie Morris – lead guitar, backing vocals
- Shannon Mulvaney – bass guitar

=== Additional personnel ===
- Josh Freese – drums
- Geza X – production, engineering
- Eddie Shryer of Future Disc – mastering
- Thom Wilson – audio mixing

== Reception ==
The single spent nine weeks on the charts, peaking on June 22, 1996, at 28.

Chart (1994)	Peak position
US Modern Rock Tracks	28

In 2003, alternative weekly Creative Loafing listed "Open the Door" amongst their "Welcome to Atlanta" mixtape of Atlanta-based artists.

== Cover versions ==
The song has been covered by Eels for the single "Flyswatter"—it would later be collected on Useless Trinkets: B-Sides, Soundtracks, Rarities and Unreleased 1996–2006. They performed the song several times on their Electro-Shock Blues Show tour in support of Electro-Shock Blues. Karaoke versions of the song were released by Stingray Digital through the iTunes Store on January 15, 2008.

=== Eels personnel ===
- Butch – drums, percussion
- E – lead vocals, guitar
- Adam Siegel – backing vocals, bass guitar
