= Sugarland (EP) =

EP by Magnapop
- Released: June 8, 1992
- Recorded: 1992
- Genre: Pop punk, pop rock, power pop
- Length: 15:12
- Language: English
- Label: Play It Again Sam
- Producer: Magnapop, Michael Stipe ("Merry")

Magnapop chronology
Sugarland (1992)	Magnapop (1992)

Magnapop EPs chronology
Sugarland (1992)	Kiss My Mouth (1993)

Sugarland is a 1992 EP by Magnapop released in Europe by Play It Again Sam Records on Compact Disc (catalogue number 450.0228.22 - BIAS 228 CD) and 12" gramophone record (450.0228.30 - BIAS 228.) The former two of these tracks are also featured on their debut album Magnapop and the latter two were added on to the 1997 re-release of the album.

== Track listing ==
All songs written by Linda Hopper and Ruthie Morris, except where noted

1. "Merry" – 3:04
2. "Garden" – 2:21
3. "Skinburns" – 4:03
4. "Snake" (Hopper, Morris, and Shannon Mulvaney) – 5:44

== Personnel ==
Magnapop

- Linda Hopper – lead vocals
- David McNair – drums
- Ruthie Morris – guitar, backing vocals
- Shannon Mulvaney – bass guitar

Technical staff

- Ed Burdell – engineering (except "Merry")
- Magnapop – production
- Michael Stipe – production

== Sales chart performance ==
The EP reached the top 20 in the Dutch Top 40.
