= Hot Boxing =

Studio album by Magnapop
- Released: July 5, 1994
- Recorded: August 1993
- Studio: Pedernales (Spicewood, Texas); Bosstown (Atlanta, Georgia)
- Genre: Pop punk, pop rock, power pop
- Length: 41:30
- Language: English
- Label: Play It Again Sam/Priority
- Producer: Bob Mould

Magnapop chronology
Big Bright Cherry (1994)	Hot Boxing (1994)	Fire All Your Guns at Once (1996)

Singles from Hot Boxing
- 1. "Slowly, Slowly" Released: 1994; 2. "Lay It Down" Released: 1994

Professional ratings
Review scores
Source	Rating
AllMusic	4/5 stars
Billboard	very favorable
Robert Christgau	(neither)
Rolling Stone	favorable
Sun Zoom Spark	favorable

Hot Boxing is the second studio album by Magnapop, released in 1994. "Lay It Down" and "Slowly, Slowly" were released as singles. Music videos were created for "Lay It Down", "Slowly, Slowly", and "Texas". Having Priority release the album was a radical departure from the label's earlier emphasis on rap.

== Track listing ==
All songs written by Linda Hopper and Ruthie Morris.

Side one

1. "Slowly, Slowly" – 3:35
2. "Texas" – 4:01
3. "Lay It Down" – 2:59
4. "Here It Comes" – 2:48
5. "Piece of Cake" – 2:49
6. "Free Mud" – 2:00
7. "Leo" – 2:37

Side two

1. "The Crush" – 3:22
2. "Ride" – 2:30
3. "In the Way" – 2:32
4. "Idiot Song" – 1:55
5. "Get It Right" – 1:52
6. "Emergency" – 4:00
7. "Skinburns" – 4:24

Special edition bonus tracks

15. "Merry" (Acoustic) – 3:26
16. "Pretty Awful" – 2:24

== Personnel ==
Magnapop

- Linda Hopper – lead vocals
- David McNair – drums
- Ruthie Morris – guitar, backing vocals
- Shannon Mulvaney – bass guitar

Production staff

- David Collins – remastering at A&M Studios
- Valerie Raimonde – design
- Ruth Leitman – art direction, photography
- Magnapop – production on "Merry" (Acoustic)
- Bob Mould – production
- Jim Wilson – engineering

== Release history ==
The album was initially released on Priority Records in the United States and Play It Again Sam in the United Kingdom, with the Japanese edition published by King; the special edition with bonus tracks was published in The Netherlands by Play It Again Sam.

Region	Date	Label	Format	Catalog
United States	July 5, 1994	Priority	Compact Disc	P2 53909
United States	July 5, 1994	Priority	cassette tape	P4 53909
Europe	July 5, 1994	Play It Again Sam	Compact Disc	450.0251.20 - BIAS 251 CD
Europe	July 5, 1994	Play It Again Sam	cassette tape	450.0521.50 - BIAS 251 MC
The Netherlands	July 5, 1994	Play It Again Sam	LP	450.0251.10 - BIAS 251 LP
Japan	1994	King	Compact Disc	KICP-408
The Netherlands	1994	Play It Again Sam	Compact Disc	450.0251.26 - BIAS 251 CDX†
Spain	1994	Fonomusic	LP	88.2210

†Special edition with bonus tracks
