= Safety Net Records =

American record label

Safety Net Records was founded by Miami Herald music critic Bill Ashton, and is co-owned by Jimmy Johnson. Safety Net released South Florida classics such as The Essentials' "Fast Music in a Slow Town" EP and The Chant's "Two Car Mirage." In 1988, Safety Net released "The Wilderness", an album by Charlie Pickett & the MC3.

According to Greg Baker, "Safety Net, like so many entities of the early 1980s scene, was a co-op project that put music first and money fourth or fifth. In fact, back then there was little of the enmity and competition so common in today's rock scenes, including Miami's. Wimmer and Ashton each had record labels, yet the two often worked together. If Open didn't have the resources to put out a record everyone knew deserved release, Safety Net would. And vice versa. For instance, when Open couldn't release an EP by The Bobs, Safety Net simply slapped on its own label. (The Bobs, with their evocatively clever lyrics and funky arrangements, were a far cry from the better-known soft-rock a cappella group with the same name). Later, the Bobs's Bob Rupe would produce a number of local records and get signed by national labels as a member of two cutting-edge bands."

== Releases ==
- The Essentials - Fast Music in a Slow Town (EP) - 1982. Fast Music in a Slow Town was recorded at Sync Studios and produced by big daddy Charlie Pickett with engineers Andy Clark and Frank Falestra.
- The Chant - Three Sheets to the Wind - 1985.
- The Bobs - In Public (cassette) - 1985. "Several years ago, local musician and producer Jim Johnson had a hunch. This is the result. This eight-song tape captures the now-defunct Bobs at a 1983 concert at a now-defunct (What else is new?) club. Six of the cuts are not available on any other Bobs recordings. The band played everything from country and punk to reggae. The performance is tough and tight, and the production and recording quality is very good. The Bobs should have been at least as popular as Hüsker Dü."
- Charlie Pickett & the MC3 - The Wilderness - 1988. Produced by Peter Buck.
- The Chant - Two Car Mirage - 1989. Produced by The Chant, John Keane and James Klotz. Executive Producer Bill Ashton. Recorded in Atlanta's Channel One Studio. It was released by Safety Net Records, and bears the cutter NET 12. It is also available in CD format, and also includes their debut album, 1985's Three Sheets to the Wind, sans one track.
