= Step Right Up: The Songs of Tom Waits =

Compilation album by Various Artists
- Released: 1995
- Label: Manifesto Records

Professional ratings
Review scores
Source	Rating
Allmusic	3/5 stars

Step Right Up: The Songs of Tom Waits is the title of a tribute album to Tom Waits, released in 1995 by Manifesto Records. The songs are performed by various artists.

== Track listing ==
All songs written by Tom Waits.

1. "Old Shoes" – [06:29] Drugstore
2. "Mockin' Bird" – [04:29] Tindersticks
3. "Better off Without a Wife" – [03:37] Pete Shelley
4. "Red Shoes by the Drugstore" – [02:33] Wedding Present
5. "Step Right Up" – [06:33] Violent Femmes
6. "Downtown" – [04:56] Alex Chilton
7. "Big Joe and Phantom 309" (Tommy Faile) – [04:16] Archers of Loaf
8. "You Can't Unring a Bell" – [05:54] These Immortal Souls
9. "Pasties and a G-String" – [04:40] Jeffrey Lee Pierce
10. "Christmas Card from a Hooker in Minneapolis" – [04:29] Magnapop
11. "Ol' '55" – [03:39] Dave Alvin
12. "Jersey Girl" – [07:29] Pale Saints
13. "Martha" – [03:19] Tim Buckley
14. "Ruby's Arms" – [04:27] Frente!
15. "I Hope That I Don't Fall in Love with You" – [03:37] 10,000 Maniacs
