= Every Grain of Sand =

Song by Bob Dylan

from the album Shot of Love
- Released: August 1981
- Recorded: May 4, 1981
- Genre: Christian rock; soft rock
- Length: 6:12
- Label: Columbia
- Songwriter: Bob Dylan
- Producers: Chuck Plotkin; Bob Dylan

Audio sample
- "Every Grain of Sand": file; help

"Every Grain of Sand" is a song written by Bob Dylan, recorded in Los Angeles in the spring of 1981 and released in August of that year on Dylan's album Shot of Love. It was subsequently included on the compilation Biograph. An early version of the song, recorded in September 1980 and featuring Jennifer Warnes on backing vocal, was released in 1991 on The Bootleg Series Volumes 1–3 (Rare & Unreleased) 1961–1991. As of June 2026, Dylan had performed the song in concert 491 times.

== Background and composition ==
Dylan had, according to his biographer Ian Bell, become a born again Christian in November 1978. "Every Grain of Sand" contains powerful allusions to Jesus, faith, and spirituality (‘In the fury of the moment I can see the Master's hand / In every leaf that trembles, in every grain of sand’). Rolling Stone described it as a "mature update" of Dylan's 1964 song "Chimes of Freedom".

That was an inspired song that came to me. I felt like I was just putting down words that were coming from somewhere else, and I just stuck it out.

— Bob Dylan

Biblical references of Every Grain of Sand include: Cain's "chain of events" - Genesis 4: 1-16 Abraham's seed as sand on the seashore - Genesis 22: 15-18 God's thoughts "more in number than the sand" - Psalm 139: 17-18 The Parable of the Sower - (newborn seed, flowers of indulgence, weeds of yesterday, choked) Mark 4: 13-20 Be of Good Cheer -Mark 6: 47-51 Sparrows/hairs numbered - Matthew 10: 28-31; Luke 12: 6-7.

The song is well known for its haunting imagery, which has been compared to that of William Blake. Although it is filled with numerous biblical references, it may also have been partly inspired by the following lines from Blake's "Auguries of Innocence":

To see a world in a grain of sand
And a heaven in a wild flower,
Hold infinity in the palm of your hand
And eternity in an hour.

== Critical reception ==
"Every Grain of Sand" is "perhaps his most sublime work to date", writes Clinton Heylin, "the summation of a number of attempts to express what the promise of redemption meant to him personally. One of his most intensely personal songs, it also remains one of his most universal. Detailing 'the time of my confession/the hour of my deepest need,' the song marks the conclusion of his evangelical period as a songwriter, something its position at the conclusion of Shot of Love tacitly acknowledges."

Paul Nelson of Rolling Stone called it "the 'Chimes of Freedom' and 'Mr. Tambourine Man' of Bob Dylan's Christian period...it has surety and strength all down the line. Also vulnerability...Dylan's beautifully idiosyncratic harmonica playing has metamorphosed into an archetype that pierces the heart and moistens the eye. And, for once, the lyrics don't let you down. The artist's Christianity is both palpable and comprehensible...For a moment or two, he touches you, and the gates of heaven dissolve into a universality that has nothing to do with most of the LP."

A 2015 Rolling Stone list of the "100 Greatest Bob Dylan Songs" placed it 10th. An article accompanying the list calls it a "spellbinding ballad" that is "equal parts Blakean mysticism and biblical resonance" and quotes U2 singer Bono who compares it to "the great Psalms of David".

Paul Williams in his book Bob Dylan, Performing Artist: The Middle Years, said, "The love in "Every Grain of Sand," though firmly rooted in Dylan's conversion experience and his Bible studies, immediately and obviously reaches beyond its context to communicate a deeply felt devotional spirit based on universal experiences: pain of self-awareness, and sense of wonder or awe at the beauty of the natural world."

Tim Riley described "Every Grain of Sand" as, "a prayer that inhabits the same intuitive zone as 'Blowin' in the Wind' - you'd swear it was a hymn passed down through the ages."

Rock critic Milo Miles wrote, "This is the one Dylan song in ten years...in which he examines a pop-culture paradox (that legendary stars in particular have to believe in ideals greater than themselves) more eloquently than any other performer has."

When Bruce Springsteen inducted Dylan into the Rock 'n' Roll Hall of Fame on January 20, 1988, he also cited "Every Grain Of Sand" as an example of his best work. "Every Grain of Sand" was cited by Elvis Costello on his list of "500 albums essential to a happy life" as possibly Dylan's finest track.

A 2021 Guardian article included it on a list of "80 Bob Dylan songs everyone should know". In 2024 Ultimate Classic Rock critic Michael Gallucci rated it as the 38th greatest soft rock song, saying that it was "Hymn-like in its delivery, with lyrical acuity borrowed from Romantic poets."

== Cover versions ==
The Tucson-based band Giant Sand recorded a cover of this song for their album Swerve, which was released in 1990. It was also covered by Emmylou Harris on her album Wrecking Ball, Barb Jungr on her album Every Grain of Sand: Barb Jungr Sings Bob Dylan, Lucy Kaplansky on the 2011 album A Nod to Bob 2 and Steve Inglis on the 2010 album Slackin' On Dylan. Emmylou Harris and Sheryl Crow performed it in 2003 at the funeral of Johnny Cash. The Blind Boys Of Alabama recorded a cover for their 2013 album I'll Find A Way, Lizz Wright also for her 2017 album Grace. The traditional Iranian musician Salah Aghili recorded a version of the song for the 2013 world music compilation From Another World: A Tribute to Bob Dylan. Nana Mouskouri on her album "Song for liberty" released in April 1982. Chrissie Hynde covered it on her 2021 album: Standing in the Doorway: Chrissie Hynde Sings Bob Dylan.

== In popular culture ==
The song appeared on the soundtrack for the 1998 film Another Day in Paradise and in the premiere episode of Marvel Studios’ Moon Knight (2022). It is also the source of the title of a fictional movie about a Dylanesque singer within Todd Haynes' 2007 film I'm Not There.
