= Slowly, Slowly (Magnapop song) =

1994 song by Magnapop

- The cover to the commercial release of the single is green and the promotional release is red with a close-up on the eyes

Single by Magnapop

from the album Hot Boxing
- A-side: "Slowly, Slowly"
- B-side: "Song #1" "Here It Comes" (Niceley Version) "Puff"
- Released: 1994
- Recorded: August 1993
- Studio: Pedernales Recording (Spicewood, Texas); Bosstown (Atlanta, Georgia) (mixing)
- Genre: Pop punk
- Length: 3:35
- Label: Play It Again Sam
- Songwriter(s): Linda Hopper, Ruthie Morris
- Producer(s): Bob Mould, Ted Niceley

Magnapop singles chronology
""Merry"/"Complicated"" (1992)	"Slowly, Slowly" (1994)	"Lay It Down" (1994)

Audio sample
- The chorus of "Slowly, Slowly" is emblematic of Magnapop's combination of aggressive guitar mixed with pop-influenced harmony vocals.: file; help

"Slowly, Slowly" is a 1994 single by Magnapop from the album Hot Boxing, released by Play It Again Sam Records on CD (catalogue number 450.0257.22 - BIAS 257 CD) and 12" gramophone record (450.0257.30 - BIAS 257), as well as a limited-edition white vinyl version (450.0257.38 - BIAS 257 X.) A promo CD edition was released by Priority Records as DPRO 50804. A recording of the song is also featured on the live album Magnapop Live at Maxwell's 03/09/2005. A music video was created for the song in 1994 and it was featured on the 1995 soundtrack to the film Mad Love.

== Track listing ==
All songs written by Linda Hopper and Ruthie Morris, except where noted

1. "Slowly, Slowly" – 3:35
2. "Song #1" (Ian MacKaye) – 2:21
3. "Here It Comes" (Niceley Version) – 2:40
4. "Puff" – 3:16

== Personnel ==
Magnapop

- Linda Hopper – lead vocals
- David McNair – drums
- Ruthie Morris – lead guitar
- Shannon Mulvaney – bass guitar

Technical staff

- David Collins – remastering at A&M Studios
- Valerie Raimonde – design
- Ruth Leitman – art direction, photography
- Bob Mould – production on "Slowly, Slowly"
- Ted Niceley – production on "Song #1", "Here It Comes" (Niceley Version), and "Puff"
- Jim Wilson – engineering

== Chart performance ==
The single spent seven weeks on the alternative rock chart in the United States, peaking on September 10, 1994, at 25.

Chart (1994)	Peak position
US Modern Rock Tracks	25
