= Mouthfeel (album) =

Studio album by Magnapop
- Released: January 25, 2005
- Recorded: May 2004
- Studio: Zero Return, Atlanta, Georgia, United States
- Genre: Pop-punk, pop rock, power pop
- Length: 30:51
- Language: English
- Label: Daemon
- Producer: Curt Wells

Magnapop chronology
| Rubbing Doesn't Help (1996) | Mouthfeel (2005) | Magnapop Live at Maxwell's 03/09/2005 (2005) |

Professional ratings
Review scores
| Source | Rating |
|---|---|
| AllMusic | 4/5 stars |
| Creative Loafing | (Favorable) |
| PopMatters | 8/10 stars |
| The Washington Post | (Favorable) |

Mouthfeel is the fourth studio album by the pop band Magnapop. It was released in 2005 through Daemon Records, with European distribution through DevilDuck Records. The album was the band's first release since their last record in 1996.

== Track listing ==
All songs written by Linda Hopper and Ruthie Morris, except where noted:

1. "We're Faded" – 2:18
2. "PDX" – 2:11
3. "Pretend I'm There" – 2:35
4. "Satellite" (Hopper, Morris, and Scott Rowe) – 3:05
5. "California" – 3:56
6. "The In-Between" (Hopper, Morris, and Rowe) – 3:18
7. "Elliott" – 2:42
8. "Smile 4u" – 2:21
9. "Think for Yourself" – 3:04
10. "Stick to Me" – 2:48
11. "Pilgrim's Prayer" – 2:28

German edition bonus live tracks

12. "Game of Pricks" (Robert Pollard) – 1:41
13. "I Don't Care" – 2:35
14. "Lay It Down" – 3:02
15. "Open the Door" – 3:13

== Personnel ==
Magnapop

- Brian Fletcher – drums
- Linda Hopper – lead vocals, art direction, photography
- Ruthie Morris – guitar, backing vocals, art direction, photography
- Scott Rowe – bass guitar

Additional personnel

- Susan Bauer Lee – design
- Cole Gerst – illustrations
- John Keane – mastering
- Nick Kimbrell – illustrations
- Jim Marrer – mixing
- Option-G – illustrations
- Curt Wells – production, engineering
