= Geza X =

American musician

Geza Gedeon (born September 28, 1952), professionally known as Geza X, is an American producer. He was a personality in the Los Angeles punk scene in the late 1970s. He is now a producer.

== Early life and career ==
Gedeon was born in Indiana and moved to California when he was a teen. Geza produced records for a number of early California punk bands including the Dead Kennedys, Germs, Redd Kross, Black Flag, The Avengers and The Weirdos. His productions of "Holiday in Cambodia" for Dead Kennedys and "Lexicon Devil" for Germs separated California's punk sound from others at the time with its eccentricity, humor and spunk, making Los Angeles and San Francisco very different from the scenes in New York or London. Record executive Howie Klein, then writing for BAM, a San Francisco music magazine, was quoted as saying "...Geza X is The Only person to capture the West Coast's compelling power and urgency." From 1979 to 1981, Geza contributed to the San Francisco punk zine Damage.

Geza also played guitar, sang, and dealt with most studio issues in his band Geza X and the Mommymen. He is credited as having pioneered the use of the headset microphones now ubiquitous in music. They released one official single and a full-length album You Goddam Kids! on the minor label Final Gear in 1982. The song "Isotope Soap" was also featured on Jello Biafra's Let Them Eat Jellybeans! sampler via Alternative Tentacles, and "We Need More Power" appeared on Posh Boy's Rodney on the ROQ: Volume Two. The "Power Pals" fan club was started after the release of the latter song. It was thought that if enough people joined this fan club they would conquer the impossible and obtain telekinetic powers to reshape history.

In the 1990s, X opened a recording studio, City Lab, with Josie Cotton, and recorded acts like Butt Trumpet. He achieved his greatest mainstream success in 1997, when Meredith Brooks' "Bitch", which he produced at City Lab, spent 30 weeks on the Billboard Hot 100, peaking at number two for six weeks.

Again with Cotton, X designed, built, owned, and operated Satellite Park Recording, in Malibu, California. Satellite Park is the "basement on the hill" Elliott Smith named From a Basement on the Hill after, having done a lot of recording there. Satellite Park closed Jan 1, 2011 after 13 years of Indie and Major-Label recording. Geza is now one of the organizers of The Vortex, a multipurpose community center in Downtown Los Angeles, dedicated to political and social activism.

== See also ==
- Category:Albums produced by Geza X
