= Linda Hopper =

American singer and songwriter

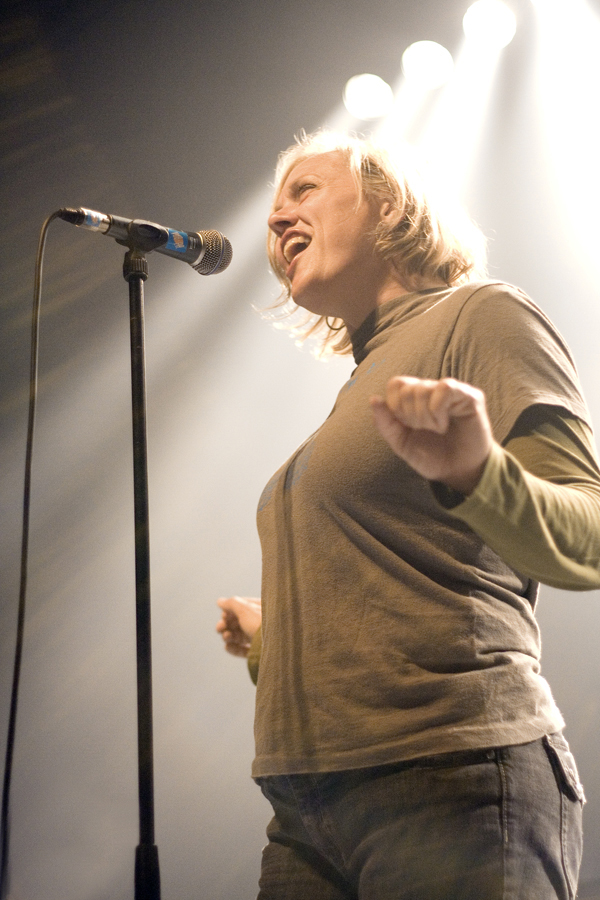
- Hopper sings with Magnapop at Het Depot in Leuven, Belgium on April 21, 2006

Background information
- Born: Linda Elizabeth Hopper; March 14, 1959 (age 67); United States
- Origin: Atlanta, Georgia, United States
- Genres: Power pop; pop punk; pop rock
- Occupations: Musician; songwriter
- Years active: 1982–present
- Labels: Caroline; Collector's Choice Music; DB Records; Daemon; King; Mt. Fuji; Never; PIAS; Priority; Safety Net; Solid
- Website: Official website

Linda Elizabeth Hopper is an American singer and the vocalist for the Atlanta, Georgia-based rock group Magnapop. Her pop punk/power pop vocal style helped to define the band's sound and she has co-written their minor hit singles "Slowly, Slowly" and "Open the Door". Prior to the formation of Magnapop, Hopper was a member of the Athens, Georgia music scene in the early 1980s, which included R.E.M., The B-52s, and her own band Oh-OK.

== Biography ==
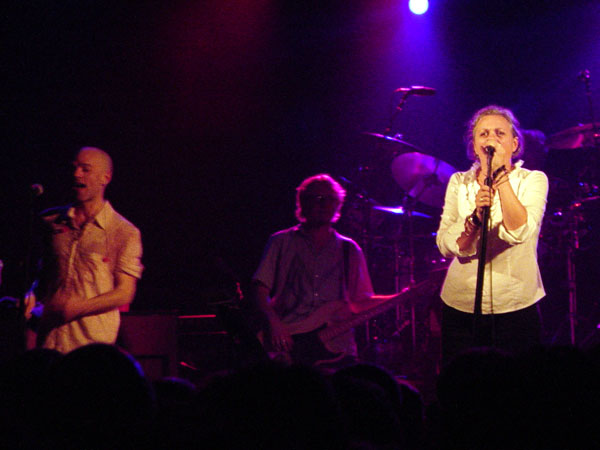
Hopper performing the Magnapop song "Favorite Writer" with R.E.M. in 2003

Hopper is a native of Marietta, Georgia who moved to Athens to attend the University of Georgia to study art in the late 1970s. There, she befriended Michael Stipe in an art design class and she introduced him to her friends. The two became involved in the early local music scene and formed the short-lived experimental music group Tanzplagen along with Stipe's sister Lynda and other local musicians. After a matter of months, the band split up and Michael Stipe formed R.E.M., while Hopper made Oh-OK with Lynda Stipe on bass guitar and drummer David McNair (a later line-up would also include Matthew Sweet.) Oh-OK opened for Stipe's noise music project 1066 Gaggle O'Sound and would go on to record two mini albums before disbanding in 1984, including 1983's Furthermore What, which was produced by Michael Stipe with a cover that he made. She then briefly belonged to a band named Holiday, who released their only EP in 1987.

In 1989, Hopper was introduced to Ruthie Morris—a guitarist who had recently moved from West Palm Beach, Florida to East Atlanta. The two became friends and began writing songs together, forming the core of what would become Magnapop. Michael Stipe saw their first public performance and offered to produce some demos for them in John Keane's Athens studio in December 1990. Their first high-profile show was at the July 1991 New York New Music Seminar along with three other bands that were introduced by Stipe. Their 1992 self-titled first album included four of the 1990 Stipe demos and was released on Caroline Records in the United States.

The band established a following touring through Benelux in the 1990s and had two minor hit singles, but after the 1996 release of Rubbing Doesn't Help, Magnapop found themselves dropped by their record label and unable to record for seven years due to contractual obligations. Hopper and Morris continued to play a few acoustic live shows as a duo into 1999, occasionally with accompaniment (such as Philadelphia bassist Billy Warburton and drummer Lance Crow) and attempted to record an EP for record label Vital Cog with a drum machine as backing, but ended up putting Magnapop on an indefinite hiatus. Hopper moved to Los Angeles and stopped performing live music until the early 2000s, when Hopper, Morris, and a group of Seattle musicians demoed some Hopper/Morris songs.

The band officially re-formed in 2003 with bassist Scott Rowe and drummer Brian Fletcher to tour the European festival circuit and record an album. In The Netherlands, Hopper also performed vocals on R.E.M.'s cover of "Favorite Writer" at two of the group's concerts on June 21 and 22. In 2005, Magnapop released their first album in nine years—Mouthfeel—on Amy Ray's Daemon Records. The re-formed group toured to support the record throughout the United States and the festival circuit in Europe and has continued to perform and record through 2010. The self-released album Chase Park was made available in late 2009.

== Musical style ==
This Family
The chorus of "This Family" includes Hopper's "speak-in-tune" style of singing and the trade-off between her (first vocal) and backing vocalist Ruthie Morris, who leads out of the sample with her punk-influenced guitar playing.

Hopper is known for her pop-influenced vocals and its interaction with Morris' particularly aggressive guitar-playing. Reviewers have called Hopper's singing "speak-in-tune" (College Music Journal) and "bell-voiced" (Billboard.) In addition, the vocal harmony between the two singers has defined the Magnapop's sound, especially on later releases that feature more of Morris' vocals.

== Discography ==
Hopper's non-Magnapop releases include:

Holiday

- Hello, 1987

Oh-OK

- Wow Mini Album, 1982 (DB Records DB63)
- Furthermore What EP, 1983 (DB Records DB69)
- "Random", appearing on the various artists compilation Squares Blot Out the Sun, 1990 (DB Records DB69)
- The Complete Recordings, 2002 (Collector's Choice Music 293)

Songwriting and vocals on all

Tanzplagen

- The Lost Single / Live 40 Watt Club, 1991 (Strangeways Records EFA 11056–10)

Songwriting and vocals on "Living by the Neck", "Meetin", and "Peter Pan"

== See also ==
- Category:Songs written by Linda Hopper
