= Ruthie Morris =

Guitarist and songwriter for alternative rock band Magnapop

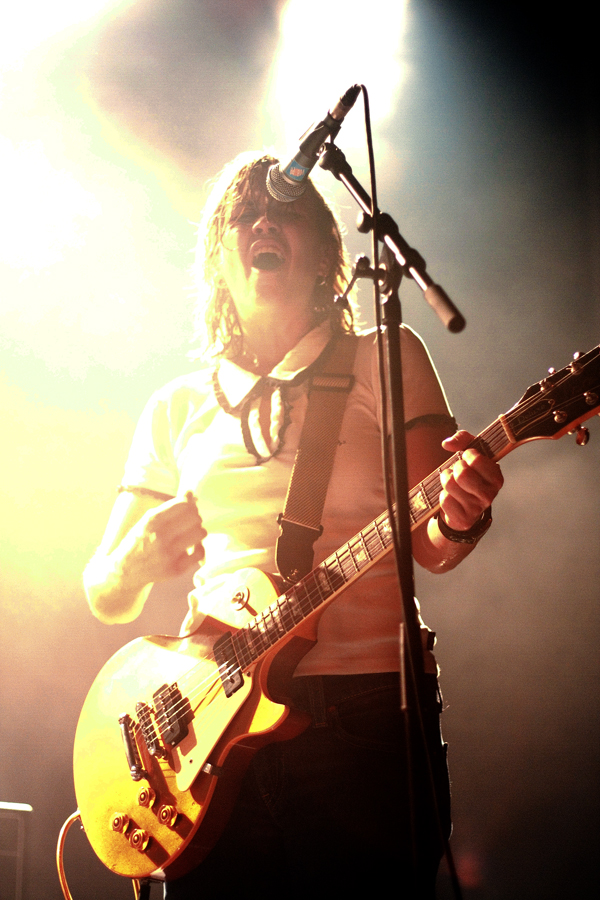
- Morris performing with Magnapop in Belgium on April 21, 2006.

Background information
- Born: Ruth Mary Morris; March 5, 1964 (age 61); West Palm Beach, Florida, U.S.
- Origin: Atlanta, Georgia, U.S.
- Genres: Alternative rock; power pop; pop rock; pop punk
- Occupations: Musician; songwriter
- Instruments: Guitar; vocals
- Years active: 1989–present
- Website: magnapop.com

Ruth Mary Morris (born March 5, 1964) is an American musician who is the guitarist for the rock band Magnapop. Her pop punk/power pop guitar style helped to define the band's sound and she has co-written their minor hit singles "Slowly, Slowly" and "Open the Door".

== History ==
Morris is originally from West Palm Beach, Florida and began playing music there as a member of The Pockets after first learning guitar at the age of 20. In 1989, she relocated to East Atlanta, where she met Linda Hopper—a member of the Athens, Georgia music scene in the late 1970s and early 1980s. The two became friends and began writing songs together, forming the core of Magnapop. Magnapop went on to record four extended plays and three studio albums through the 1990s and released two minor hit singles on the Modern Rock Tracks chart—"Slowly, Slowly" and "Open the Door". The band also toured the music festival circuit and opened for major alternative rock acts such as R.E.M.

After the 1996 release of Rubbing Doesn't Help, Magnapop found themselves dropped by their record label, and unable to record for seven years due to contractual obligations. In this time, Morris moved to Seattle, Washington. In 2004, she played with the one-off group The New Candidates with Curtis Hall and released the 7" single "I'm Coming Down"/"Set It on Fire" on Mt. Fuji Records, with recording and mixing by John Randolph; recording, mixing, vocals, and percussion by Mike Jaworski; and bass guitar by Ben Larson. Hopper, Morris, and a group of Seattle musicians also demoed some Hopper/Morris songs during this period. In 2005, Magnapop released their first album in nine years—Mouthfeel—on Amy Ray's Daemon Records. The re-formed group toured to support the record throughout the United States and the festival circuit in Europe and has continued to perform and record through 2010. The self-released album Chase Park was made available in late 2009.

In the 2009 Georgia floods, Morris lost much of her musical equipment, Magnapop memorabilia, and the first Compact Disc pressing of Chase Park. Atlanta musicians—including former Magnapop bandmate Tim Lee and Amy Ray—threw a benefit concert to assist her in replacing her losses on December 15, 2009.

In 1993, Juliana Hatfield wrote "Ruthless" in honor of Morris after the two had a conversation about Camille Paglia while touring in 1992 ("We're all gushin', but I swear we really mean it, man/We're all sucking up to Ruthie.") It appeared as a B-side on the Juliana Hatfield Three singles "Spin the Bottle" and "My Sister".

== Musical style ==
Open the Door
The chorus of "Open the Door" includes Ruthie Morris' guitar playing, which has been described on this song as "a flowing, chiming, Smiths/Johnny Marr guitar sound" that is uncharacteristic of her usual aggressive guitar playing.

Morris is known for her particularly aggressive guitar-playing and its interaction with Linda Hopper's pop-influenced vocals. Critics have compared her style to punk acts like Ramones as well as softer alternative rock musicians such as Johnny Marr.

== Discography ==
Morris' non-Magnapop releases include:

- Holy Gang – "Free Tyson Free!" from the album Free Tyson Free! (1994)

Sampled guitar

- New Candidates – "I'm Coming Down"/"Set It on Fire" (2004)

Guitar, songwriting, and vocals

== See also ==
- Category:Songs written by Ruthie Morris
