= Volcano Entertainment discography =

This is a list of items that have been released by the American record label Volcano Entertainment.

== General information ==
Volcano Entertainment has released much of its own material, however, it is also responsible for reissuing releases by Zoo Entertainment (its predecessor), Capricorn Records and Scotti Bros. Records.

The Release Date column is reserved for the date which Volcano released their branded version of the release, not the original release date.

The Original Label and Original Release Date columns are for the information on the release that Volcano has reissued.

In some cases (notably with Scotti. Bros reissues), Volcano has reissued something that was already reissued or remastered. In those cases, both dates are put in the "Original Release Date" column.

=== Original Label key ===
For the Original Label column, the following short-forms are used for the labels in the chart below. Any other labels are mentioned in whole.

Label Name	Code
Scotti Bros. Records	SBR
Street Life Records (Scotti Bros. sublabel)	SLR
Zoo Entertainment	ZE
Stress Entertainment (Zoo sublabel)	SE
Capricorn Records	CR

== Catalog Number Scheme ==
Initially, Volcano releases had the catalog number prefix 61422-3XXXX-X where the first 4 Xs are the unique number identifying the release and the last X designates the format. Thus, different formats have the same first four Xs with a distinguishing number at the end. However, there are some cases where different formats have altogether different catalog numbers.

Volcano began using BMG's consolidated 82876-XXXXX-X system along with many of Zomba's other sublabels following the Zomba Media Group's sale to that company.

=== Format Numbers ===
1: 12" vinyl
2: CD
3: VHS
4: Cassette
7: 7" vinyl
9: DVD

== 61422-3XXXX-X era (approx. 1996–2003) ==
Cat. No.	Artist	Title	Format	Release date YYYY-MM-DD	Original Release Date YYYY-MM-DD	Original Label	Notes
61422-30095	Widespread Panic	Panic in the Streets	DVD	2002-11-19			DVD was an original Volcano release VHS was originally on Capricorn
61422-31013	Odds	Neopolitan	CD		1991-09-10	ZE	
61422-31015	Matthew Sweet	Girlfriend	CD	1998	1992-03-10	ZE	
61422-31027	Tool	Opiate	CD, Vinyl		1992-03-10	ZE	
61422-31027	Tool	Undertow	CD, Vinyl		1993-04-06	ZE	
61422-31032	Sonny Landreth	Outward Bound	CD		1992-07-14	ZE	
61422-31053	Odds	Neopolitan	CD		1993	ZE	
61422-31073	Tool	Undertow (clean)	CD		1993-04-06	ZE	
61422-31078	Matthew Sweet	Son of Altered Beast	CD		1994-03-15	ZE	
61422-31087	Tool	Ænima	CD, Vinyl		1996-09-17	ZE	American
61422-31094	Hoodoo Gurus	Crank	CD		1994-09-13	ZE	
61422-31113	20 Fingers	20 Fingers	CD		1995-04-16	ZE	
61422-31123	Hoodoo Gurus	In Blue Cave	CD		1996-08	ZE	
61422-31128	Dogstar	Quattro Formaggi	CD		1996-07-15	ZE	
61422-31129	Little Feat	Live from Neon Park	CD	2000-09-04	1996-06-18	ZE	
61422-31130	Matthew Sweet	Blue Sky on Mars	CD		1997-03-25	ZE	
61422-31133	Dogstar	Our Little Visionary	CD	1997-10-15	1996-09-17	ZE	Original was released in Japan only
61422-31141	Lusk	Free Mars	CD		1996-08-13	Zoo/Volcano	This release was branded with both "Zoo" and "Volcano" logos.
61422-31142	Akinyele	Put It in Your Mouth	Vinyl		1996-08-13	SE	
61422-31144	Tool	Ænima	CD		1996-10-01	ZE	Europe and Australasia
61422-31145	Tool	Ænima	Vinyl		1996-09-17	ZE	
61422-31148	Size 14	Size 14	CD	1997-07-27			
61422-31152	Various	Mojave	CD	1997-08-12			
61422-31153	Akinyele	Aktapuss	CD, vinyl	1999-10-12			
61422-31154	Matthew Sweet	In Reverse	CD	1999-10-09			
61422-31155	Various	That '70s Album (Rockin')	CD	1999-09-28			
61422-31156	Various	That '70s Album (Jammin')	CD	1999-09-28			
61422-31157	Matthew Sweet	Time Capsule: Best of 90/00	CD, Cassette	2000-09-26			
61422-31158	Tool	Salival	CD/VHS	2000-12-10			
61422-31159	Tool	Salival	CD/DVD	2000-12-10			
61422-31160	Tool	Lateralus	CD, vinyl, cassette	2001-05-15			
61422-31161	Tool	Lateralus (clean)	CD, cassette	2001-05-15			
61422-31162	Peach GB	Giving Birth to a Stone	CD	2002	2000-09-26 (this version); 1994 (original)	Vile Beat Records	Originally on Mad Minute Records
61422-32001	John Cafferty & the Beaver Brown Band	Eddie and the Cruisers: Original Motion Picture Soundtrack	CD	1999-03	1990-12-13 (this version); 1983-09-23 (original)	SBR	
61422-32002	John Cafferty & the Beaver Brown Band	Eddie and the Cruisers II: Original Motion Picture Soundtrack	CD	1999-03	1990-12-13 (this version); 1989-08-18 (original)	SBR	
61422-32003	"Weird Al" Yankovic	"Weird Al" Yankovic	CD, cassette	1999-03	1991 (this version); 1983 (original)	SBR	
61422-32004	"Weird Al" Yankovic	In 3-D	CD, cassette	1999-03	1991 (this version); 1984 (original)	SBR	
61422-32005	"Weird Al" Yankovic	Dare to Be Stupid	CD, cassette	1999-03	1991 (this version); 1985 (original)	SBR	
61422-32006	"Weird Al" Yankovic	Polka Party!	CD, cassette	1999-03	1991 (this version); 1986 (original)	SBR	
61422-32007	"Weird Al" Yankovic	Even Worse	CD, cassette	1999-03	1991 (this version); 1988 (original)	SBR	
61422-32008	"Weird Al" Yankovic	"Weird Al" Yankovic's Greatest Hits	CD, cassette	1999-03	1991 (this version); 1989 (original)	SBR	
61422-32010	Survivor	Vital Signs	CD	1999-03	1991 (this version); 1984 (original)	SBR	
61422-32011	Survivor	Eye of the Tiger	CD	1999-03	1991 (this version); 1984 (original)	SBR	
61422-32013	"Weird Al" Yankovic	UHF – Original Motion Picture Soundtrack and Other Stuff	CD, cassette	1999-03	1992-03-10 (this version); 1989-07-21 (original)	SBR	
61422-32014	Various	Rocky IV – Original Motion Picture Soundtrack	CD	1999-03	1992-03-10 (this version); 1985-11-27 (original)	SBR	
61422-32015	Various	The Transformers: The Movie (Original Motion Picture Soundtrack)	CD	1999-03	1992-03-10 (this version); 1986-08-08 (original)	SBR	
61422-32016	"Weird Al" Yankovic	Off the Deep End	CD, cassette	1999-03	1992-04-14	SBR	
61422-32017	James Brown	The Greatest Hits of the Fourth Decade	CD	1999-03	1992-04-14	SBR	
61422-32018	Various	There Is Love: The Wedding Songs	CD	1999-03	1992-04-14	SBR	
61422-32019	Survivor	Greatest Hits	CD	1999-03	1993-06-22	SBR	
61422-32020	"Weird Al" Yankovic	Alapalooza	CD, cassette	1999-03	1993-10-05	SBR	
61422-32021	"Weird Al" Yankovic	The Food Album	CD, cassette	1999-03	1993-06-22	SBR	
61422-32024	"Weird Al" Yankovic	Permanent Record: Al in the Box	CD	1999-03	1994-09-27	SBR	
61422-32025	Various	Your Perfect Wedding	CD	1999-03	1994-08-30	SBR	
61422-32026	"Weird Al" Yankovic	Greatest Hits Volume II	CD	1999-03	1994-10-25	SBR	
61422-32027	Various	Stars and Stripes Forever	CD	1999-03	1995-05-23	SBR	
61422-32028	James Brown	Live at the Apollo 1995	CD	1999-03	1995-07-18	SBR	
61422-32029	"Weird Al" Yankovic	The TV Album	CD, cassette	1999-03	1995-11-07	SBR	
61422-32030	"Weird Al" Yankovic	Bad Hair Day	CD, cassette	1999-03	1996-03-12	SBR	
61422-32036	To Kool Chris	It's Time 2 Party!	CD	1999-03	1998-02-24	SBR	
61422-32037	Leif Garrett	The Leif Garrett Collection	CD	1999-03	1998-01-13	SBR	
61422-32038	Various	Revenge of the Nerds: Original Motion Picture Soundtrack	CD			SBR	
61422-32040	Various	Stars and Stripes Forever Volume II	CD			SBR	
61422-32042	"Weird Al" Yankovic	The "Weird Al" Yankovic Video Library	VHS			SBR	
61422-32043	"Weird Al" Yankovic	Bad Hair Day: The Videos	VHS			SBR	
61422-32044	James Brown	Gravity	CD		1986-09	SBR	
61422-32045	James Brown	I'm Real	CD			SBR	
61422-32047	Survivor	When Seconds Count	CD			SBR	
61422-32048	Various	Cobra: Original Motion Picture Soundtrack	CD	1999-02-23	1992	SBR	
61422-32049	David Cassidy	Didn't You Used To Be...	CD			SBR	
61422-32050	Electric Light Orchestra Part Two	Performs ELO's Greatest Hits Live	CD			SBR	
61422-32051	John Cafferty & The Beaver Brown Band	Tough All Over	CD			SBR	
61422-32053	John Cafferty & The Beaver Brown Band	Roadhouse	CD			SBR	
61422-32061	Young Dubliners	Breathe	CD			SBR	
61422-32075	The Nylons	Hits of the 60's: A Cappella Style	CD	1998	1997-05-27	SBR	
61422-32078	Various	The Search is Over: Favorite Power Ballads	CD	1998	1997-07-15	SBR	
61422-32081	James Horner	Another 48 Hrs.: Original Motion Picture Soundtrack	CD	1998	1995-04-16	SBR	
61422-32083	Electric Light Orchestra Part Two	Electric Light Orchestra Part Two	CD	1998	1991-06-11	SBR	
61422-32097	Trevor Jones	Cliffhanger: Original Motion Picture Soundtrack	CD	1998	1993-05-25	SBR	
61422-32114	Various	Working For A Living	CD	1998	1997-08-19	SBR	
61422-32117	Jerry Goldsmith	Rambo III: Original Motion Picture Soundtrack	CD	1998	1992-03-10 (this version); 1988 (original)	SBR	
61422-32118	"Weird Al" Yankovic	Running with Scissors	CD, Cassette	1999-06-27			
61422-32119	"Weird Al" Yankovic	Alapalooza: The Videos	VHS	1998-09-01	1994-02-02	SBR	
61422-32121	"Weird Al" Yankovic	Live!	VHS, DVD	1999-11-23 (VHS); 2000-04-18 (DVD)			
61422-32122	311	311	CD	2001	1995-07-25	CR	
61422-32124	311	Music	CD	2001	1993-03-09	CR	
61422-32132	Lynyrd Skynyrd	Endangered Species	CD	2001	1994-08-09	CR	
61422-32145	Widespread Panic	Widespread Panic	CD	2001	1991-07-23	CR	
61422-32146	Widespread Panic	Everyday	CD	2001	1993-03-23	CR	
61422-32152	Gov't Mule	Live... With a Little Help from Our Friends	CD	2001-02-05	1999-11-16	CR	
61422-32161	Cake	Motorcade of Generosity	CD	2001-02-05	1994-02-07	CR	
61422-32183	Galactic	We Love 'Em Tonight: Live at Tipitina's	CD	2001-07-10			
61422-32184	311	From Chaos	CD, vinyl	2001-06-19			
61422-32186	Survivor	Survivor	CD	2001-09-25	1979	SBR	
61422-32187	Survivor	Premonition	CD	2001-09-25	1981	SBR	
61422-32188	Survivor	Caught in the Game	CD	2001-09-25	1983	SBR	
61422-32189	Survivor	Too Hot to Sleep	CD	2001-09-25	1988	SBR	
61422-32190	2 Skinnee J's	Volumizer	CD	2002-03-19		CR	
61422-32191	Various	Y Tu Mamá También: The Soundtrack to the Film by Alfonso Cuaró	CD, cassette	2002-03-05			
61422-32193	Galactic	Vintage Reserve	CD, cassette	2003-04-15			
61422-32194	"Weird Al" Yankovic	Poodle Hat	CD, cassette	2003-05-20			
61422-32420	Galactic	Late for the Future	CD, cassette	2001	2000-04-04	Polygram	
61422-32867	Cake	Fashion Nugget	CD	2001-02-01	1996-09-17	CR	Canadian
61422-33009	Tool	Opiate	CD		1992-03-10	ZE	Canadian
61422-33010	Tool	Undertow	CD		1993-04-06	ZE	Canadian
61422-33011	Matthew Sweet	In Reverse	CD	1999-10-09			Canadian
61422-33012	Various	That '70s Album (Rockin')	CD				Canadian
61422-33013	Various	That '70s Album (Jammin')	CD				Canadian
61422-33017	Tool	Lateralus	CD		2001-05-15		Canadian
61422-34020	"Weird Al" Yankovic	Poodle Hat	CD				Canadian
61422-34228	Cake	Fashion Nugget	CD	2001-02-05	1996-09-17	CR	US
61422-34266	Akinyele	Love Me For Free	Vinyl		1996-12-16	ZE	
61422-34266	Lusk	Backworlds	7"	1997			
61422-34270	The Interpreters	In Rememberance (sic) of that Fine Fine Evening...	CD, 7"	1997			
61422-34272	The O'Jays	What's Stopping You	CD, vinyl, cassette	1997-06-03			
61422-34274	Akinyele	Thug Ness	Vinyl	1997-07-21			
61422-34274	"Weird Al" Yankovic	The Saga Begins	CD	2000-01-25			
61422-34280	"Weird Al" Yankovic	It's All About the Pentiums	CD	1999-08-09			
61422-34281	Akinyele	Take a Lick	CD	1999-08-17			
61422-34282	Akinyele	Take a Lick	Vinyl	1999-08-17			
61422-36645	311	Soundsystem	CD	2001	1999-10-12	CR	
61422-37223	Matthew Sweet	Untitled Single	CD	1997			
61422-38092	Cake	Prolonging the Magic	CD	2001-04-24		CR	Canadian
61422-38521	Galactic	Coolin' Off	CD	2001	1998 (this version); 1996 (original)	CR	Originally on Fog City Records
61422-38689	John Lee Hooker	The Healer	CD	2001-02-01	1999 (this version); 1989 (original)	CR	
61422-38842	Galactic	Crazyhorse Mongoose	CD	2001	1998	CR	
