= Time Capsule: The Best of Matthew Sweet 90/00 =

Compilation album by Matthew Sweet
- Released: September 26, 2000
- Recorded: 1990–2000
- Genre: Alternative rock
- Label: Volcano Records

Matthew Sweet chronology
In Reverse (1999)	Time Capsule: The Best of Matthew Sweet 90/00 (2000)	To Understand: The Early Recordings of Matthew Sweet (2002)

Professional ratings
Review scores
Source	Rating
AllMusic	4.5/5 stars
Entertainment Weekly	A−
The New Rolling Stone Album Guide	3/5 stars

Time Capsule: The Best of Matthew Sweet 90/00 is a compilation album by American alternative rock musician Matthew Sweet. It was released on September 26, 2000 via Volcano Entertainment. It contains two new songs: "Ready" and "So Far".

The model on the album's front and back covers is actress Tuesday Weld, reprising her appearance on the cover of Sweet's 1991 breakthrough album Girfriend.

== Track listing ==
All songs written by Matthew Sweet.

1. "Divine Intervention" - 5:37 (Girlfriend)
2. "I've Been Waiting" - 3:36 (Girlfriend)
3. "Girlfriend" - 3:40 (Girlfriend)
4. "You Don't Love Me" - 5:21 (Girlfriend)
5. "Time Capsule" - 3:56 (Altered Beast)
6. "The Ugly Truth" - 3:18 (Altered Beast)
7. "Devil With the Green Eyes" [remix] - 4:41 (Son of Altered Beast)
8. "Someone to Pull the Trigger" -3:55 (Altered Beast)
9. "Sick of Myself" - 3:38 (100% Fun)
10. "We're the Same" - 3:03 (100% Fun)
11. "Where You Get Love" - 3:35 (Blue Sky on Mars)
12. "Until You Break" - 4:50 (Blue Sky on Mars)
13. "Behind the Smile" - 2:23 (Blue Sky on Mars)
14. "If Time Permits" - 3:03 (In Reverse)
15. "What Matters" - 4:13 (In Reverse)
16. "Hide" - 4:02 (In Reverse)
17. "Ready" - 3:57 (new song)
18. "So Far" - 3:17 (new song)
