= Basic (Robert Quine and Fred Maher album) =

Studio album by Robert Quine and Fred Maher
- Released: July 1984
- Recorded: December 1983 – May 1984 in New York City, New York, United States
- Genre: Avant-garde
- Length: 49:47
- Label: E.G.
- Producer: Fred Maher; Robert Quine

Robert Quine chronology
Escape (1981)	Basic (1984)

Basic is a collaboration album by American musicians Robert Quine and Fred Maher, released in July 1984 by E.G. Records. Produced by the duo in Quine's living room, the record followed their tenure in Lou Reed's backing band, and provided Quine with a different working environment from the underground music scene of New York City, with which he had become disenchanted.

The record features ten instrumentals built around electric guitars, bass guitars and programmed drums. Simplicity was key to the recording, which was taped using a four-track recorder, with an emphasis on improvisation, texture, color and concise guitar and drum parts. The beats, largely programmed by Maher, are polyrhytmic in Latin and African styles, while Quine's guitar lines favour drones, inflection and a jagged phrasing. The latter used the album to incorporate a wide array of influences, including styles of blues, minimalism, psychedelia and country, and musicians such as Miles Davis, Scotty Moore and the Stooges. The ambient music of Brian Eno was also a large influence on the recording, particularly in its simplicity and use of analog delay and tape echo.

On release, Quine described Basic as the only recording of his which he enjoyed. The album praised by some music critics for its originality in vision, while others did not enjoy it. The album was later an inspiration on the Philadelphia-based guitarist Chris Forsyth, who recorded the album This Is BASIC (2024) in tribute to it. Basic was remastered and re-released in 1996 by Virgin Records.

== Background ==
Robert Quine and Fred Maher were figures on the avant-new wave and punk funk scenes in New York City, and these roots are evident on Basic. Both had been members of Richard Hell and the Voidoids, before leaving to join Lou Reed's backing band, featuring together on Reed's album Live in Italy (1984) and striking a friendship. Though Quine was still touring with Reed by the recording of Basic, he completed it as his first project after leaving Reed's band. The decision to leave left him without "a decent living at playing music" but he worked on projects like Basic until a similar opportunity occurred again. The album marked a change of environment for Quine, who had become disenchanted with New York's underground music scene and the egos of its personalities. The guitarist had earlier collaborated with Jody Harris on an album, Escape (1981), which Quine taped on his four-track recorder; Quine says that the genesis for Basic was similar, as someone he met at E.G. Records through Brian Eno asked him to make another record; he told her "Someone's got to come over and pressure me to do it." The musician reflected in an interview with Perfect Sound Forever that he only set out to make records in this period if they were to be "self-indulgent" records for himself, saying "I want to do it on my own terms."

According to Quine, the "key difference" between Escape and Basic is that, whereas Escape was heavily influenced by Miles Davis, Basic was inspired by much of Eno's ambient work, especially the textures of Ambient 4: On Land (1982). The guitarist had met Eno in 1978 and intended to collaborate on one of his rock albums before the latter abandoned the project and initiated his ambient direction. Quine nonetheless said that the experience allowed him to experience Eno's studio approach, which strongly affected him. "What he taught me about echo and sound and approaching recording was amazing. I'd have a digital delay, an analog delay, and a tape echo with the guitar running through them, and he'd start playing with them and come up with outrageous things. One thing he taught me was that analog delays and cheap tape echoes approximate the sound of a natural echo more closely than digital delays, which are too clean. See, when a natural echo bounces back, there's going to be all kinds of high-end loss. Things like that are what intrigue me right now."

== Recording ==
Quine and Maher produced Basic together, with engineering by Mario Salvati. The album was recorded in the living room of Quine's New York home – as befits the basic style of the music – from December 1983 to May 1984, and many tracks appearing on the final album are either first or second takes, though it is not always apparent whether it is Quine or Maher playing a guitar part. Quine had previously recorded Escape in his living room, and retained the location because "if someone covers over and you have a fruitless day, you haven't wasted any money. That happened plenty of times. One day, something'll happen and I'll go into a trance."

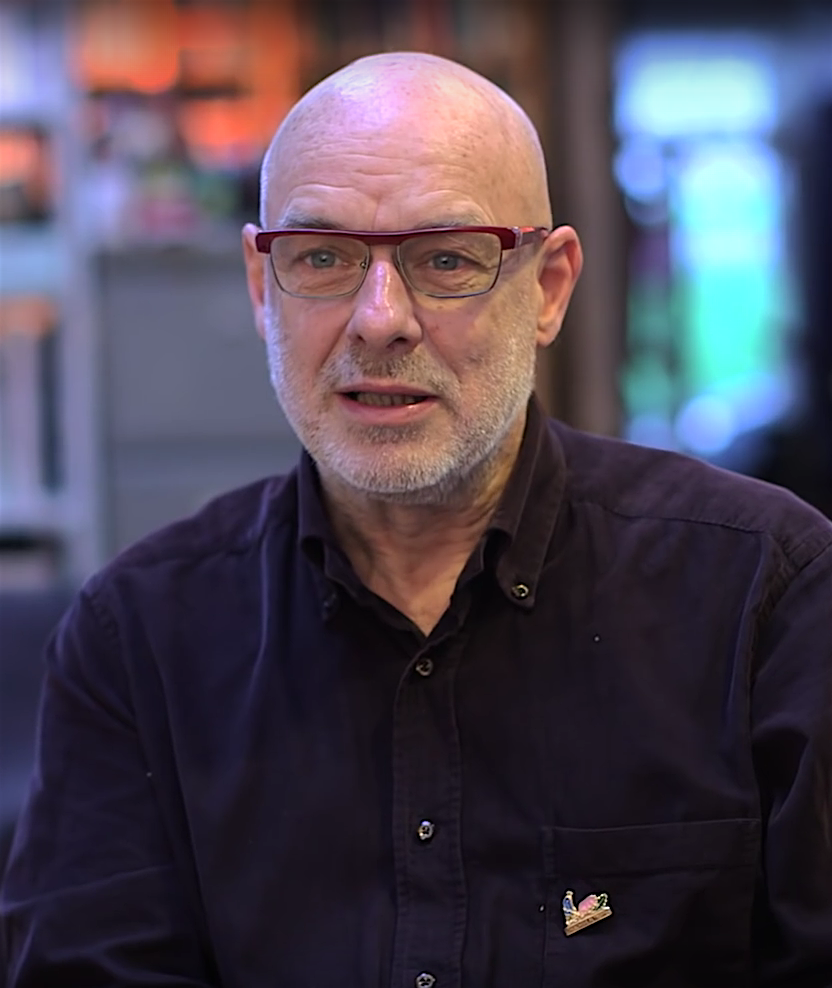
The recording of Basic was inspired in part by Brian Eno (pictured in 2015).

The instrumentation consists of electric guitars, bass guitars and programmed drums. Quine described the general recording process of the pieces as often initiating when he thought of specific drum beats to relay to Maher, which the pair would then record the basic tracks for, containing "drum machine, Fred on bass and sometimes guitar, and me. Then we might do an overdub pass, and that would be it. The way things fit together would be just as much a surprise to me as to anybody, which is nice, but scary." Although Basic is a guitar-based album, Maher was less experienced than Quine in this regard, having only played guitar for three years; instead, he had been a drummer for twelve years. Quine used the recording to "put all [his] influences" into a project, and utilised 16-seconds delays, and a four-track Teac Portastudio, the latter of which the guitarist admired as "there's no planning, no mapping things out, no nest of cables. You can pretty much just do it. That way, if the music works, it really works — and if it doesn't work, it really doesn't work. That's how I like it."

To achieve the sounds he desired, Quine drew heavily on Eno's approaches to echo and delay. The influence of Eno was also reflected in the simplicity of the recording, with Quine deciding that, for many of the tracks on Basic, adding a guitar solo on top would be distracting: "That's why I called it Basic — they're the basic tracks. Even though it sounds like a lot of guitars on 'Bandage Bait', for instance, that was just two tracks, live." Specifically, the title emerged when the duo were building the tracks, doing the drum programming and 'ambient things'; for "Stray", Quine said he initially contributed a guitar solo, "but then I listened the next day and decided to leave it alone. Even if they don't sound anything like Eno, the Eno influence is what caused me to leave a lot of those tracks alone. They're basic tracks with the textures already there." The completed recording was mixed at Sorcerer Sound.

== Composition ==
=== Musical style ===
Basic is an album of highly improvised instrumentals centred on guitar, bass and drums. The structurally simple pieces are built around Maher's programmed, electronic rhythms and grooves, which roll while Quine contributes multitracked guitars and repetitive rhythm patterns, defining the inner rhythms with what John Diliberto describes as "slow, droning textures, casual picking, and exuberant slides." The guitar lines are economical and the drum machines are programmed with simplicity and clarity. According to Crispin Sartwell, "Quine responds passively to the rhythm tracks, preferring inflection and coloring to melody." A reviewer for CMJ New Music Report writes that, as with other "interpretive guitarists/avantists" like Robert Fripp, Adrian Belew, Andy Summers and Phil Manzanera, the "jagged, minimalist phrasing" of Quine's guitar work "has resoundingly a strong ring to it (akin to Frippertronics)", which gets "splatted, improvised and woven" around the programmed polyrhythms, which are in Latin and African styles. Music critic Mark Fleischmann notes the "pro forma mechanized rhythm patterns" layered with embroidered guitar riffs.

According to Diliberto, Quine frequently merges "several divergent styles within a single piece", writing: "Blues, country & western, psychedelia, minimalist loops, and slide guitar course through Basic in a synchronous guitar carnival." The album changes mood and color between tracks; several of them are drone-based, while some are esoteric, avant-garde pieces, whereas others have been compared to guitar jams from the late 1960s San Francisco music scene. Mistakes are left on the album to "retain the spontaneity of what was structured just a minute or two before the recording". Quine commented that Basic contains all his influences, "everything I know", and that as such the album has "some concept behind [it]". He explained, "On Basic, the drums are too loud and this and that but that's the way I wanted it. It had the Miles influence, the Velvet Underground influence, the Stooges influence, the ambient thing." His jazz orientations are also present, as evident in the complicated overlaps.

=== Tracks ===
An example of the musical variety within certain tracks, "Pickup" features dissonance over a droning background, in addition to unusual guitar bending. According to Quine, the track's 'mutated riff' derives from Scotty Moore's playing on Elvis Presley's version of "Milkcow Blues Boogie" (1955) (later featured on 1976's The Sun Sessions), which Quine has "broken down", while the chords behind it were derived from the Byrds. Diliberto comments that the track's desert feel resembles "a Hugo Montenegro score with lazy, detuned guitar slides playing off Quine's laconic leads. He's casual to the point of off-handedness, yet there's an intensity and conciseness to his playing born from his new wave days." "Bluffer" is paced with a double-speed rhythm that elicits "a restrained feedback rave-up", and contains an untraditional guitar solo. Quine and Maher believed that the extra guitar solo in "Stray" obfuscated its overall rhythmic texture. Another example of wide variety within certain tracks, "Summer Storm" features a vague Irish feel before transforming into a droning piece.

"'65" features gentle Stratocaster playing with heavy delay, and was described by Quine as the result of listening to Miles Davis' "He Loved Him Madly" (1974) for "thousands of hours — I'm not exaggerating. The way things in '65' are floating, the way the guitars hover and barely resolve, then go to another place, the way it's spliced together — that's the feel I got from Miles." Quine considered it his favourite track on the album, and "one of the best things I've ever done in my life", adding that it "reflects how I feel about music with that Lester Young thing with the sadness." "Bandage Bait", as with "Fala" and "'65", showcases Quine's distinctive stylized guitar work. Sartwell deems "Dark Place" to be "an exercise in mere noise."

"Despair" has been described as "an acid-blues against a Frippertronic drone and electro-beat", and contains a Frank Zappa-esque, wah-wah-style guitar sound. Discussing the track's name and abrupt ending, Quine noted: "I was pushing this Systech overdrive pedal — a very strange fuzz box that has an EQ control to get these nasal sounds — through an Electro-Harmonix Memory Man delay and into a [Tristech] Tube Cube, which is basically a direct box with a feature that says 'overdrive,' but actually tunes in natural harmonics on top, almost like an [Aphex] Aural Exciter." The guitarist was bemused by his playing and abandoned the piece to answer the telephone which he could hear through his headphones. Maher returned the next day and convinced him the song was worthy of including on the album. "Village" features a languid tune contrasting with a juggernaut rhythm, and its intro has been dubbed an example of "Hawaiian Ambient".

== Release ==
Released in July 1984, Basic was one of two albums – the other being Hans-Joachim Roedelius' Geschenk des Augenblicks – Gift of the Moment – to be released on E.G. Records since they began a new distribution deal with the Cartel network, in order to bring their album catalogue to a wider array of specialist shops. After its release, Quine called it the only recording of his that he could bear to listen to, later saying: "If people don't appreciate the damn thing, I have no interest in banging my head against the wall." Marcia Resnick contributed photography to the album sleeve. The album was remastered by Simon Heyworth and released as a CD by Virgin and Charisma Records on July 1, 1996.

== Critical reception ==
Professional ratings
Review scores
Source	Rating
AllMusic	4.5/5 stars
DownBeat	3.5/5 stars
Record Mirror	2/3 stars
The Village Voice	A−
Wisconsin State Journal	3/5 stars

According to writer Bill Milkowski in 1986, both Escape and Basic "have been heralded by critics for their inventiveness and overall vision." Nonetheless, Matthew Blackwell of Pitchfork reflects: "Few people understood Basic when it came out and even fewer liked it."

Reviewing Basic for New Musical Express, Cynthia Rose praised Quine's and Maher's shared affinities, adding that despite its intricate overlaps and polished sound, the album shows "musicians who listened to each other and reacted in straightforwardly musical terms. Some of those terms are as venerable as the electric guitar itself, but others are stylish, of-the-moment inventions." She adds that despite the energetic, tense sound, the album "works up a powerful nervous sweat", using a "Lower East Side lingua franca I'd recommend. In Modern Recording, Bob Grossweiner described Basic as "a tone poem of colors, textures and layers of sound that is an antithesis to commerciality yet aesthetically pleasing, simply because some record label is more interested in an artistic statement than sales." He also praised the sonic qualities as "excellent" for a home recording.

Wisconsin State Journal reviewer James Henke remarked that Quine used a wide array of guitar effects to "create some atmospheric instrumental music that's at times as jarring as it is beautiful." Reviewers for CMJ New Music Report opined that the best tracks spotlight "the distinctive resiliency of Quine's stylized guitar" and asserted that listeners of the album will "discover that much can happen with very little." Record Mirror deemed it to be "instrumental wallpaper esoterica" completely unlike Quine's work with the Voidoids and added: "If Eno had used real instruments instead of synthesizers for his Ambient projects it might have sounded something like this." In The Village Voice, Robert Christgau deemed Basic to be as "tough and weird" as Brian Eno's collaboration with Jon Hassell, Fourth World, Vol. 1: Possible Musics (1980), adding that while it forgoes that album's "generalized ambient hold" by featuring a separate mood and color on each track, Basic is nonetheless "the avant-garde equivalent of the great album Duane Eddy never made."

Reviewing the album for High Fidelity, Sartwell praised the tracks for being "detailed, pleasing, even ravishing" and hailed Quine's concise guitar lines for their "flashes of incisiveness and wit", but adds that despite its distinctive sound, Basic is also "static and at times monotonous. Quine has a tendency to drone that goes unchecked here, and Maher sometimes imposes a metronomic lockstep that is anything but pleasing." In his review for DownBeat, Diliberto believed the album succeeds because of "what's happening beneath and between" the rhythms, championing how Quine "orchestrates in cinemascope" with his varied, multitracked guitar work. However, Diliberto noted that while the rhythm machines are "imaginatively programmed", they get "left on automatic pilot", sacrificing any strong sense of interaction between Maher and Quine, adding that, often, "the juggernaut rhythms pound some beautifully languid tunes into bruised submission. Sometimes it seems like Quine's off painting landscapes while Maher is steamrolling the highways through them. But even this can't subvert the cinematic journeys of Basic."

In a negative review for The Vancouver Sun, Frank Rutter described Basic as "an album of guitar and drum duets that might interest some musicians but it sounded monotonous to me", believing the problem could lay with its originality. Montreal newspaper The Gazette included Basic in their list of the 45 best albums of 1984. Retrospectively, AllMusic's David Szatmary deems Basic to be a "studied, tempered showcase" for Quine's "tasty guitar licks" and Maher's able backings. In Trouser Press, Fleischmann named it "a mesmerizing no-frills celebration of the electric guitar", adding: "Don't look for memorable tunes or even clever tricks — this is a player's album, amazingly pure, though not so simple."

== Legacy ==
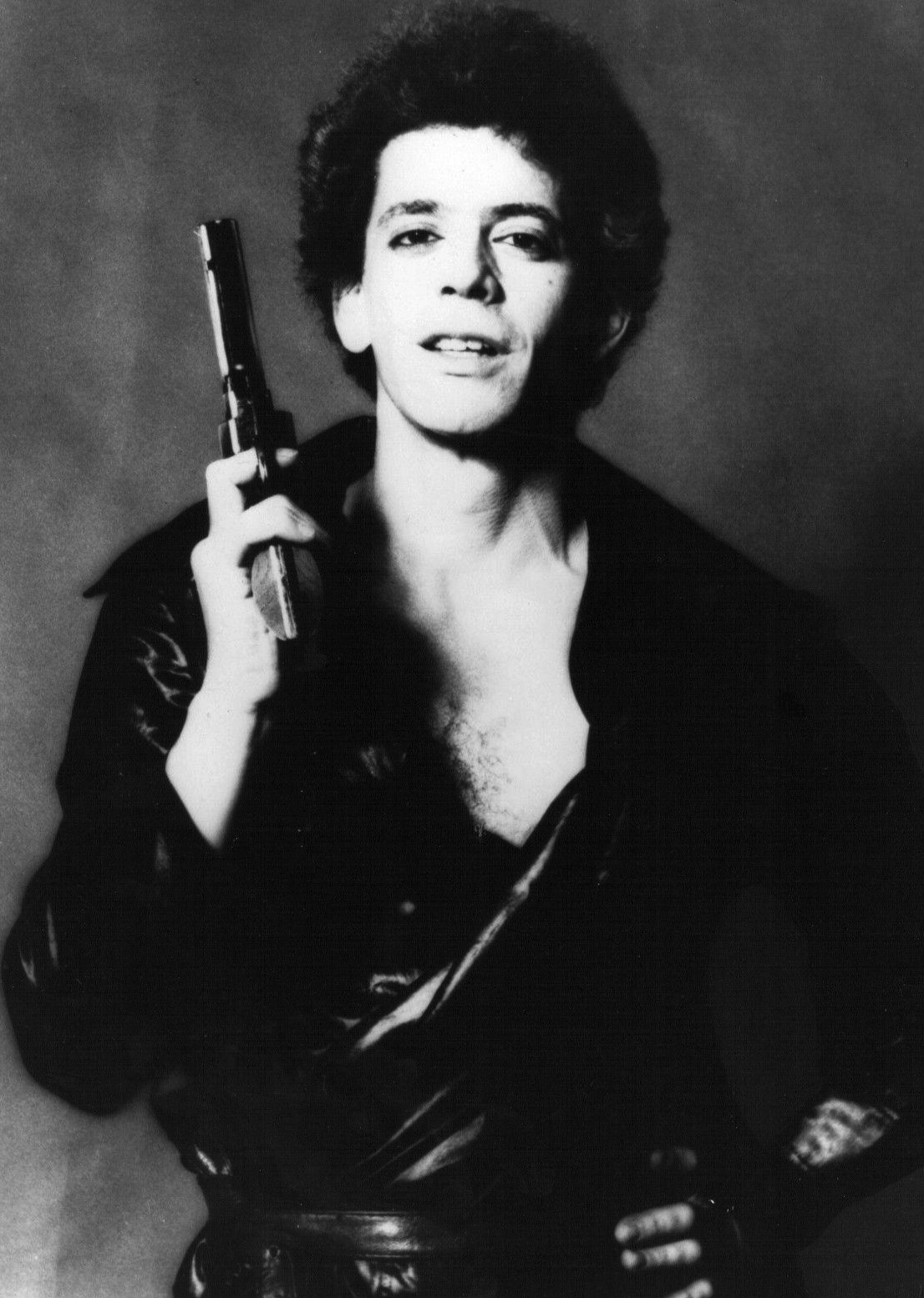
In 1984, Lou Reed named Basic among his favourite albums.

Basic was one of several mid-1980s albums recorded by collaborative duos working with drum machines and incorporating heavy overdubbing, alongside Fred Frith's and Henry Kaiser's Who Needs Enemies? (1983), Andy Summers' and Robert Fripp's Bewitched (1984) and Bill Frisell's and Vernon Reid's Smash & Scatteration (1985); Milkowski believes that Quine and Maher's project "had the distinct advantage" over the other albums because of Maher's skills as a drummer as well as guitarist. Quine and Maher subsequently worked on other projects together in the 1990s, collaborating on albums by Lloyd Cole, and Suzanne Rhatigan. Lou Reed described Basic as one of his current favourite albums in a 1984 interview in The Pittsburgh Press. Philadelphia guitarist Chris Forsyth has been influenced by the album, particularly on "Techno Top" from All Time Present (2019) and the album This Is BASIC (2024), the latter a tribute to Basic recorded with fellow guitarist Mick Millevoi and Natural Information Society percussionist Mikel Patrick Avery. Forsyth considers Basic to be comparable to landmark albums by Davis, Eno and Joni Mitchell.

Gene Santoro, writing in a 1986 DownBeat article, commented that Basic remained the best to hear Quine's multiple influences collide. Also in 1986, Guitar Player called it "a stunning, varicolored musical tapestry from Robert's encyclopedic influences". However, in Pitchfork, Blackwell writes that although the album's sounds – its mix of "programmed drums, ambient drift, and indulgent guitar explorations" – were outré in 1984, they "quickly became dated." In 1997, Quine commented on the album's unpopularity: "People say 'you should put five or six records a year'. Just ask them 'What's your favorite track off Basic?' and they just look at me. There's very few people who like those records."

== Track listing ==
All tracks written by Fred Maher and Robert Quine.

Side one

1. "Pickup" – 5:18
2. "Bluffer" – 5:48
3. "Fala" – 3:53
4. "Stray" – 3:49
5. "Summer Storm" – 4:04

Side two

1. "'65" – 6:00
2. "Bandage Bait" – 6:11
3. "Dark Place" – 2:34
4. "Despair" – 4:18
5. "Village" – 7:42

== Personnel ==
Adapted from the liner notes of Basic

- Robert Quine – guitar, bass guitar, drum machine, production
- Fred Maher – guitar, bass guitar, drum machine, production
- Mario Salvati – mixing
- Greg Calbi – mastering
- Marcia Resnick – photography, design
