= Valley Lodge =

Valley Lodge may refer to:

Places

- Arkansas Valley Lodge No. 21, Prince Hall Masons, Wichita, Kansas, listed on the National Register of Historic Places (NRHP)
- Valley Lodge (Baldwin, Maine), a historic house, NRHP-listed
- Odd Fellows Valley Lodge No. 189 Building, Bay City, Michigan, NRHP-listed

Other

- Valley Lodge (band)
  - Valley Lodge (album)
