= Tomato (musician) =

American musician (born 1969)

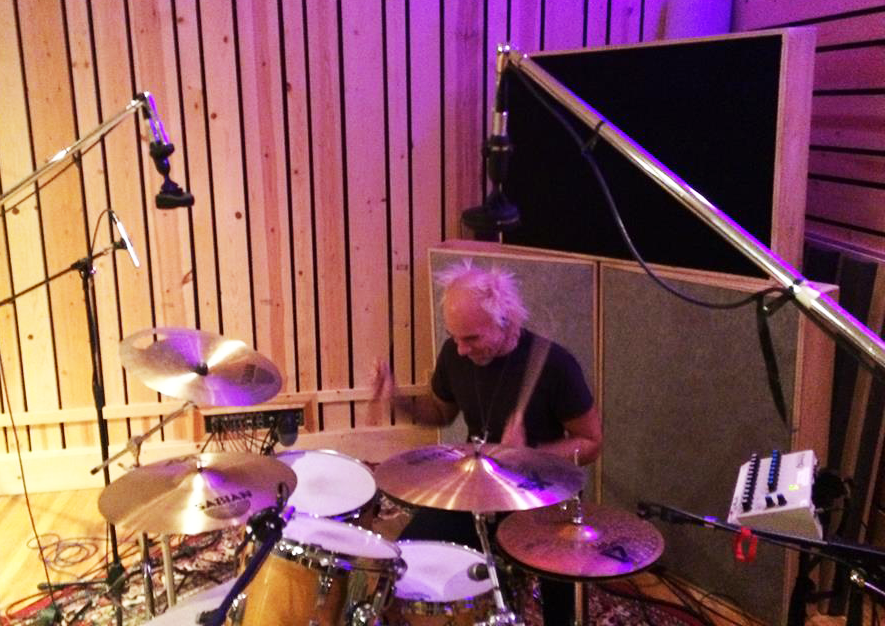
- Tomato performing at Harfenist Spin Studios in 2015

Background information
- Also known as: Tomato11
- Born: Chris Harfenist; August 17, 1969 (age 56); United States
- Genres: Alternative rock
- Occupations: Drummer, singer, songwriter
- Years active: 1998 - present
- Labels: RCA Records; Hybrid Recordings; Chocodog Records; Steven Records
- Spouse: Lori Harfenist

Tomato (born Chris Harfenist August 17, 1969) is an American musician who is best known for being the lead singer and drummer for the alternative rock band Sound of Urchin. Tomato was born in New York City, grew up in Rockland County, New York and resides in Brooklyn, New York. He also plays drums in The Moistboyz as well as Dave Dreiwitz from Ween's "Crescent Moon". Tomato was mentored by Gary Chester, author of Modern Drummer publication's drum book "The New Breed". Tomato has played drums for Ween, as well as for Ellen Foley and the Dirty Old Men, and recorded drums with Tenacious D for the Comedy Central Crank Yankers version of "The Friendship Song". Tomato also appeared on an episode of the Nickelodeon kids' show The Naked Brothers Band (TV series) as a guest drummer along with Questlove and Claude Coleman, Jr. Tomato is also married to internet celebrity Lori Harfenist, host of The Resident YouTube series.

In 2009, in addition to playing with Sound of Urchin, Tomato opened his own after school music program in New York City entitled "Tomato's House Of Rock" [THOR]. Previously Tomato was the music director for the NYC branch of the Paul Green School of Rock.

On April 30, 2010, the formation of DiamondSnake was announced. The heavy metal band's members include Tomato as well as Moby, Dave Hill (Valley Lodge) and Phil Costello (Satanicide, Valley Lodge).

In April 2012, Tomato opened a second branch of Tomato's House Of Rock in Cobble Hill, Brooklyn, New York. As stated in the Village Voice: "New York City is a bastion of educational institutions, but one of its most innovative educators doesn't even have a teaching certificate. What he does have is a lifetime of experience as a rock musician, a passion for imparting real-world skills to kids, and two schools—one in Hell's Kitchen and one in Brooklyn. He goes by Tomato. His school: Tomato's House of Rock, or THOR."

In Fall 2012, the first season of the Louder Education web series debuted on the Metal Injection website, with Tomato and Alex Skolnick as hosts.

== Bands ==
- Sound of Urchin
- Moistboyz
- Crescent Moon
- DiamondSnake

== Discography ==
=== Early pre-official SOU 4-track albums (1994-1998) ===
Year	Title	Label
1994	Four Fours From A Calendar Fan	Steven Records (originally released on Mighty Monster as cassette only)
1995	Springtime Makes Me Feel	Steven Records
1996	Approval – Cob 9	Steven Records
1997	Earth Blanket	Steven Records
1998	Willow For Gasoline Alley	Steven Records

=== Official SOU Studio albums (1998–present) ===
Year	Title	Label
1998	All That And A Brandy Alexander	Steven Records
2000	The Orange E.P.	RCA Records
2001	The Jack And Diane E.P.	RCA Records
2002	You Are The Best	RCA Records
2002	Blame Canada – Live In Toronto	RCA Records promo only
2005	The Diamond	Hybrid Recordings
2008	Rejoice CD-Only release	Self-Release To Fans Only
2014	Black Castle Vinyl-Only Release	Baby Gas Mask Records
2015	The WoozyFly Sessions	Baby Gas Mask Records
2017	The Diamond Deluxe	Steven Records
2017	Jack And Diane Deluxe	Steven Records
2019	Rejoice Official Extended Release	Steven Records/Baby Gas Mask Records
2019	Rock n' Roll Is True E.P.	Steven Records
2019	Black Castle Official Extended Release	Steven Records/Baby Gas Mask Records
2019	The Crypt E.P.	Steven Records

=== Moistboyz ===
Year	Title	Label
2010	Live Jihad	Moistboyz
