= Lori Harfenist =

- Harfenist on RT in 2012
- Born: United States
- Other name: The Resident
- Occupations: Internet personality, media personality, YouTuber, author, commentator
- Known for: Russia Today (RT)
- Spouse: Tomato
- Website: theresident.net

Lori Harfenist is an American internet celebrity, media personality, YouTuber, author and commentator and host of the YouTube series The Resident.

She has been producing and hosting The Resident for the internet and television since the early 2000s, The Resident began as a public access television show in 2001.

Harfenist has been featured on CNN, Fox News and Greg Gutfeld's radio show, in The New York Times and Russia Today (RT).

In April 2016, Harfenist published her debut book, a post-apocalyptic, science fiction novel, I, Human.

== Russia Today (RT) ==
Harfenist became the subject of controversy in 2015 after posting to the Russian state television network Russia Today (RT) website a three-minute satirical video entitled "Obvi-Illuminati", claiming United States presidential candidate Hillary Clinton was actually a candidate for the Illuminati. The video inferred the triangular logo used by the technology company Groundwork, which was employed by the 2016 presidential campaign of Hillary Clinton, and was actually an Illuminati logo. Harfenist also remarked that Groundwork had a parent company with a Hebrew name, Harfenist jokingly said, "Not only do they have an Illuminati logo, they also have backers who speak Hebrew."

RT took down the video following it being misunderstood by certain viewers. Tablet magazine later uploaded a version of the video to YouTube, calling it antisemitic. Harfenist denied that the video was antisemitic and informed BuzzFeed News that she was an independent contractor and not an employee of RT. She was quoted as saying, "I'm not a reporter, I'm not a journalist, I'm just someone who makes funny videos and most of them are very stupid, and because RT is so political, this is being taken as something that it’s not," adding, "It’s ridiculous to try to make this a nefarious propaganda thing." An RT spokesperson stated, "It was a satirical video, and clearly made in jest – but apparently not clearly enough. We took it down because some people misinterpreted it and we wanted to avoid further confusion."

Harfenist described herself in 2015 as always being an American who was anti-establishment and that the Russian owned RT is one news outlet that allows her to be that. She said, "RT has been vilified in the American media, and I’ve taken a lot of heat for that. I’ve had 'friends' end 'friendships' because they simply couldn’t understand how I could work for such a villainous country. So stupid. Clearly they were never friends and have their heads somewhere else," adding, "RT has been great to me. They let me do what I want and pay me for it."

In 2017, CNN's Jake Tapper posted on Twitter that he was being targeted by RT for being an outspoken critic of United States President Donald Trump. Harfenist had spoken about Tapper in an RT video, first praising him for his handling of a pair of doctored conservative attacks on him, the first being a Twitter post, the other a video, she then went on to say if those who watch CNN should keep taking the network seriously when Tapper, one of CNN's biggest names, continues to get into fights on Twitter. Harfenist said, "Like, he actually gets into bratty fights with anonymous people who could be 12-year-olds for all he knows. And then he retweets fake tweets of himself. This is supposed to be one of CNN's 'serious newsmen.'" Harfenist called the right-wing memes attempting to disparage Tapper ridiculous and then saying, "The stuff he really gets into on Twitter is even more ridiculous." Retaliating on Twitter, Tapper wrote, "How interesting that Russia's government funded propaganda channel is targeting me. Why would that be?" In a second Twitter response Tapper took aim at Russian President Vladimir Putin, writing, "While cracking down on freedom/human rights, Putin has amassed a fortune estimated to be worth $200 billion."

== Personal life ==
Harfenist graduated from Pace University with a Bachelor of Arts in communications. She is married to musician Tomato, lead singer and drummer of the alternative rock band Sound of Urchin.
