= Escape (Jody Harris and Robert Quine album) =

Studio album by Jody Harris/Robert Quine
- Released: 1981
- Recorded: September 1979–July 1980
- Studio: Robert Quine's apartment, New York City
- Genre: No wave
- Length: 46:10
- Label: Infidelity
- Producer: Jody Harris, Robert Quine

Robert Quine chronology
Escape (1981)	Basic (1984)

Escape is a studio album by guitarists Jody Harris and Robert Quine, released in 1981 through the label Infidelity.

== Track listing ==
All tracks are written by Jody Harris and Robert Quine.

Side one
No.	Title	Length
1.	"Flagpole Jitters"	12:30
2.	"Don't Throw That Knife"	7:48

Side two
No.	Title	Length
1.	"Up in Daisy's Penthouse"	5:44
2.	"Termites of 1938"	9:06
3.	"Pardon My Clutch"	11:02

== Personnel ==
- Jody Harris – guitar, bass guitar, percussion, production
- Myers/Kesel – design
- Robert Quine – guitar, bass guitar, percussion, production
- Marcia Resnick – photography
