= Semester at Sea (album) =

Studio album by Valley Lodge
- Released: April 3, 2009
- Genre: Power pop
- Length: 34:35
- Label: Explosive Industries, Powerpop Academy

Valley Lodge chronology
Valley Lodge (2005)	Semester at Sea (2009)	Use Your Weapons (2013)

Semester at Sea is the second studio album by the American power pop band Valley Lodge, released on April 3, 2009 by Explosive Industries. It was the first new studio recording by the band since their eponymous debut album, which was released in 2005.

To coincide with the Japanese re-release of Use Your Weapons by Powerpop Academy in late 2013, a limited-edition version of Semester at Sea was given out as a bonus for those who had purchased Use Your Weapons at the Shinjuku Tower Records store.

The album includes a cover of Bob Welch's 1972 song "Sentimental Lady", which first appeared on the Fleetwood Mac album Bare Trees.

== Track listing ==
1. "Break Your Heart" – 2:37
2. "The Door" – 4:00
3. "When the Rain Comes" – 3:51
4. "Baby, It's a Shame" – 3:22
5. "Barricade" – 2:59
6. "If You Love Me" – 2:45
7. "Comin' Around" – 3:15
8. "My Baby" – 2:39
9. "Sentimental Lady" – 3:02
10. "Slow Dancin' (Romancin')" – 2:49
11. "Lose Your Man" – 3:10

== Personnel ==
- Dave Hill – vocals, guitar
- John Kimbrough – vocals, guitar
- Phil Costello – vocals, bass guitar
- Rob Pfeiffer – drums
