= Use Your Weapons =

Studio album by Valley Lodge
- Released: September 3, 2013
- Genre: Power pop
- Length: 33:06
- Label: Explosive Industries, Powerpop Academy

Valley Lodge chronology
Semester at Sea (2009)	Use Your Weapons (2013)

Use Your Weapons is the third studio album by the American power pop band Valley Lodge. The album was released on September 3, 2013 by the record label Explosive Industries. It was re-released in Japan on November 20, 2013 by Powerpop Academy with two bonus tracks.

== Track listings ==
No.	Title	Length
1.	"Go"	3:47
2.	"Sweet Elizabeth"	3:20
3.	"Kiss Me, I'm Drunk"	3:32
4.	"Pretty Thing"	4:04
5.	"Make Up Your Mind"	3:06
6.	"Waiting in the Rain"	2:20
7.	"Gimme Gimme"	3:32
8.	"Restless Heart"	3:07
9.	"Are You Okay?"	2:55
10.	"Blind"	3:19

== Japanese bonus tracks ==
No.	Title	Length
11.	"I Don't Know A Thing About Love"	2:56
12.	"Tonight If I Can Sleep"	3:28

=== Notes ===
The song 'Go' features as the theme music on the HBO show Last Week Tonight with John Oliver.
