= Valley Lodge (band) =

American power pop band

- Origin: Brooklyn, New York
- Genre: Power pop
- Years active: 2005–present
- Labels: D-Text Records, Explosive Industries, Powerpop Academy
- Members: Dave Hill; John Kimbrough; Rob Pfeiffer; Phil Costello; Eddie Eyeball
- Website: valleylodgehq.com

Valley Lodge is an American power pop band from New York City. Its members are John Kimbrough, Dave Hill, bass player/singer Phil Costello and drummer Rob Pfeiffer.

== Band history ==
Valley Lodge came together when John Kimbrough, former singer-guitarist for Minnesota power pop band Walt Mink, met up with comedian/musician Dave Hill (formerly a member of bands such as Cobra Verde, and Sons of Elvis) to compare the home demos they were working on.

Joined by bass player/singer Phil Costello (Satanicide) and drummer Rob Pfeiffer (Sense Field), and inspired by bands such as Cheap Trick, Raspberries, Thin Lizzy and Big Star, they released their eponymous debut album in 2005. The album proved particularly popular in Japan, even getting a re-release with bonus tracks in 2008. The band went on to tour there in March 2009.

The band released their second album, Semester at Sea, on April 21, 2009, containing ten new songs by the band and a cover of Bob Welch's 1970s hit, "Sentimental Lady". At that time, Eddie Eyeball (2 Skinnee J's) joined the band on bass guitar/backing vocals, and Phil Costello switched to guitar.

On October 19, 2018, the band released their fourth album, Fog Machine on Tee Pee Records.

On February 15, 2024, the band released "I Wrote a Song," the first single from their fifth album, Shadows in Paradise, with a music video featuring actor/artist Olive Hui from the band Late Cambrian. It was followed in April by "Daylights." Shadows in Paradise was released on April 19, 2024. The album was produced by Tom Beaujour (Nada Surf, Juliana Hatfield), who would then replace John Kimbrough as the band's second guitarist.

=== In the media ===
Valley Lodge's songs "Over It" and "All of My Loving" were featured in episodes of the sitcom Cougar Town. The band's song "Coming Around" was also featured on the sitcom Raising Hope. Their song "The Door" was used in a commercial for the GMC Sierra truck. "All of My Loving" is the theme song for Dave Hill's podcast, Dave Hill's Podcasting Incident. Recently, "All of My Loving" was also featured on a Sonic commercial for their hot dogs.

Valley Lodge's third album, Use Your Weapons, was released on September 3, 2013. A video for the first single "Go" was filmed in Los Angeles in July 2013, and directed by Tim Fornara.

In February 2011, "Naked City" was used as song for the in-game radio station RoadRock on Test Drive Unlimited 2.

In April 2014, "Go" became the theme song for Last Week Tonight with John Oliver on HBO. In November 2015, the band appeared on Last Week Tonight to play "Go" live, as a way to close the show's second-season finale.

== Discography ==
- Valley Lodge (2005)
- Semester at Sea (2009)
- Use Your Weapons (2013)
- Fog Machine (2018)
- Shadows in Paradise (2024)

== Members ==
=== Current ===
- Dave Hill – vocals, guitar
- Rob Pfeiffer – drums
- Eddie Eyeball – bass guitar, vocals
- Tom Beaujour - guitar, vocals
- Phil Costello – vocals, guitar

=== Former ===
- John Kimbrough – vocals, guitar
