= Sound of Urchin =

American rock band

The Sound of Urchin
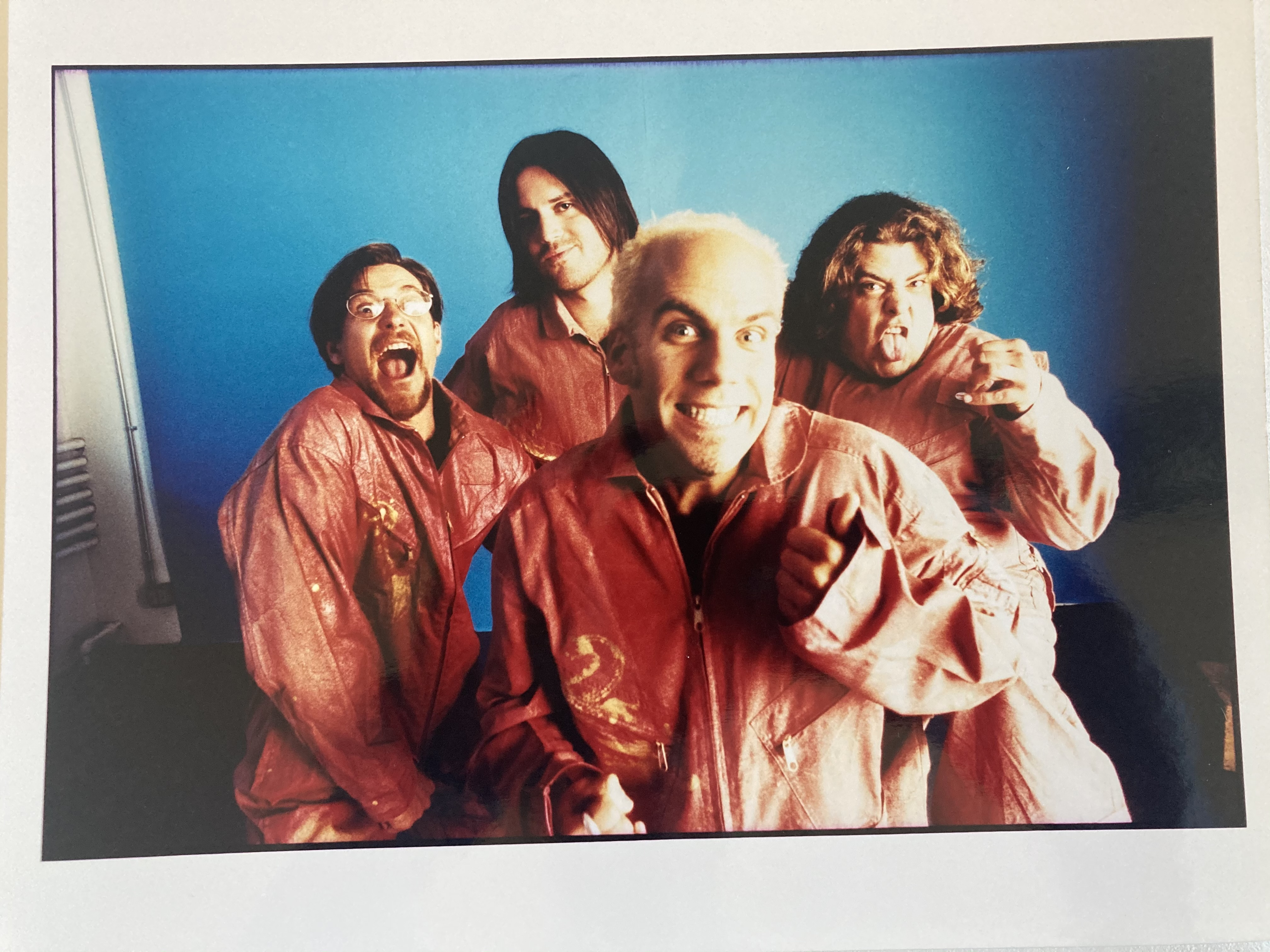
- Sound of Urchin in 2000

Background information
- Origin: Brooklyn, New York; New Hope, Pennsylvania
- Genres: Alternative rock Experimental rock Heavy metal Arena rock Outsider music
- Years active: 1998–present
- Labels: RCA, Hybrid, Steven
- Members: Tomato (Chris Harfenist); Reverend B-ILL (Bill Fowler); Matt Holloman; Brian Ellingham
- Website: soundofurchin.com

The Sound of Urchin (Sound Of Urchin / SOU / TSOU / Urchin) is a musically diverse "outsider arena-rock" band from Brooklyn, New York, and New Hope, Pennsylvania. SOU is known for its eclectic songs, for energetic, spontaneous live shows, and for its heavy touring schedule.

== Band history ==
The Sound of Urchin's debut EP was released on lead-singer/drummer Tomato’s own independent label, Steven Records.

After further developing their style and sound, they signed to major label RCA Records and began working with Dean Ween of Ween. From 2000 to 2002, the band released two E.P.’s, The Orange E.P. (produced by Dean Ween) and the Jack And Diane E.P. (produced by Keith Cleversley of Flaming Lips and Hum fame), and their first full-length album, You Are The Best (produced by Keith Cleversley), on RCA Records. In 2002, the band made a video for their song "Scary Skull Eyes". It was directed by Lorin Finkelstein and featured on MTV2’s 120 Minutes.

In 2005, The Sound of Urchin's second full-length album The Diamond was released on Hybrid Recordings, and produced by Fountains Of Wayne's Adam Schlesinger, and mixed by Chris Shaw. The independent label is led by former A&M Records label head Al Cafaro and legendary concert promoter John Scher. SOU performed their best-known song from 2005, "There Are People In The Clouds", before nationwide audiences on CBS' The Late Late Show with Craig Ferguson. The album also includes cameos by Twisted Sister's Jay Jay French and Smashing Pumpkins' James Iha.

In 2007 SOU released the "Rejoice" album, their 3rd full-length release, as a fans-only CD, to those who attended the Rejoice US Tour. It was produced by Tomato and mixed by Josh Wilbur. And features the lineup that included Tomato on vocals/drums, B-ILL and Robbie “Seahag” Mangano on lead guitars, and Michael Davidson on bass. Rejoice also features vocal legend Ellen Foley (Meatloaf, The Clash) on the song “The Rooster Says Good Morning”.

2014 saw the vinyl-only release of the 4th full length Urchin album, "Black Castle", on Tucson AZ's Baby Gas Mask Records. Black Castle was produced by Tomato and showcases a more experimental studio/home-recording hybrid sound.

In 2015, Urchin released the full length "The WoozyFly Sessions" album, which were live-in-the-studio recordings of live show staples of the Rejoice-era line-up.

2017 saw the re-release of both "The Diamond" album as "The Diamond Deluxe", and the "Jack And Diane E.P." as "Jack And Diane Deluxe", as extended albums with unreleased recordings from each era as bonus tracks.

2019 saw the official release of the "Rejoice" album on Tomato's Steven Records, with the bonus “Rock n’ Roll is True E.P." as extended tracks; and also saw the official release of the "Black Castle" album on Tomato's Steven Records in 2019, with the bonus “The Crypt E.P." as extended tracks.

== Touring history and affiliations ==
The Sound of Urchin have performed alongside bands from a diverse range of rock subgenres, including Tenacious D, Ween, Dio/Deep Purple/Scorpions, Cracker, Mike Watt, Slightly Stoopid, Fishbone, The North Mississippi Allstars, The Urge, SR-71, Trik Turner, Bargain Music, The Ziggens, as well as sharing stages with Public Enemy, Twisted Sister, Slash's Snakepit, Dick Dale, Butthole Surfers, Everclear, Project/Object, Vernon Reid, Lit, 2 Skinnee J's, Cobra Verde, and Local H.

Urchin has had a long affiliation with the band Ween; Dean Ween has been a mentor to the band and produced their first major label release The Orange E.P., Tomato and B-ILL play in Dean Ween and Guy Heller's Moistboyz (featured on the "Live Jihad" DVD release) and have played with Ween, Dean Ween's Tenderloin and toured with the Dean Ween Group in 2018. B-ILL also played guitar on Ween's “The Mollusk” album, and Tomato plays drums with Ween's bassist Dave Dreiwitz, as a duo called Crescent Moon.

They have also collaborated with Tenacious D; Urchin was the opening act on their 2001 tour, and Tomato played drums with them for their 2002 Comedy Central Crank Yankers recording of “Friendship”.

== Members ==
=== Current members ===
- Tomato (Chris Harfenist) – drums, lead vocal
- Reverend B-ILL (Bill Fowler) – lead guitar, main backup vocal

=== Side members ===
- Black Sebabbitt (Jack Krause) – co-writer, character vocals
- Mr. Richard Rickles (Wayne Price) – tambourine, dancer
- Jah Rob (Rob Marcario) - artwork
- Johnny Stees (Jason Pietropaulo) - Greek runs, tour manager, ruling the night

=== Live members ===
- Jordan Shapiro - keyboard
- Chris Shepherd - lead guitar
- Conor Kinsman – bass
- Matt Holloman - lead guitar
- Brian Ellingham - bass

=== Past members ===
- Doo Doo Brown (Chris Huetz) – bass, backup vocal
- Hollywood Scotty Choc (Scott Heydt) – lead guitar, backup vocal
- Barbie Smooth (Mike Huetz) – producer, guitar
- Seahag (Robbie Mangano) - lead guitar, bass, backup vocal
- Michael Davidson – bass
- Josh Musto - guitar, backup vocal
- Karina Rykman - guitar, bass, keyboards

== Discography ==
=== Early pre-official SOU 4-track albums (1994–1998) ===
Year	Title	Label
1994	Four Fours From A Calendar Fan	Steven Records (originally released on Mighty Monster as cassette only)
1995	Springtime Makes Me Feel	Steven Records
1996	Approval – Cob 9	Steven Records
1997	Earth Blanket	Steven Records
1998	Willow For Gasoline Alley	Steven Records

=== Official SOU studio albums (1998–present) ===
Year	Title	Label
1998	All That And A Brandy Alexander	Steven Records
2000	The Orange E.P.	RCA Records
2001	The Jack And Diane E.P.	RCA Records
2002	You Are The Best	RCA Records
2002	Blame Canada – Live In Toronto	RCA Records promo only
2005	The Diamond	Hybrid Recordings
2008	Rejoice CD-Only release	Self-Release To Fans Only
2014	Black Castle Vinyl-Only Release	Baby Gas Mask Records
2015	The WoozyFly Sessions	Baby Gas Mask Records
2017	The Diamond Deluxe	Steven Records
2017	Jack And Diane Deluxe	Steven Records
2019	Rejoice Official Extended Release	Steven Records/Baby Gas Mask Records
2019	Rock n' Roll Is True E.P.	Steven Records
2019	Black Castle Official Extended Release	Steven Records/Baby Gas Mask Records
2019	The Crypt E.P.	Steven Records
