= Different Times =

Different Times may refer to:

- Different Times (musical), a 1972 musical by Michael Brown
- Different Times: Lou Reed in the '70s
- Different Times (Five O'Clock Heroes album), 2011
