= III (Moistboyz album) =

Moistboyz III

Studio album by Moistboyz
- Released: September 3, 2002
- Genre: Rock
- Length: 29:02
- Labels: Ipecac Recordings (CD) (IPC-033)

Moistboyz chronology
Moistboyz II (1996)	Moistboyz III (2002)	Moistboyz IV (2005)

Professional ratings
Review scores
Source	Rating
Allmusic	4/5 stars
Pitchfork	5.6/10

Moistboyz III (also referred to as simply III) is the second studio album by American hard rock band Moistboyz. It was released in 2002 by Ipecac Recordings. Exclaim! wrote that "each track is a laser guided guitar riff masterpiece."

== Track listing ==
All tracks are written by Moistboyz.

Moistboyz III Track listing
No.	Title	Length
1.	"Shitheel"	2:13
2.	"I Am the Reaper"	2:15
3.	"In the Valley of the Sun"	3:15
4.	"The Tweaker"	3:15
5.	"The Spike"	3:09
6.	"Five Time Loser"	3:21
7.	"Great American Zero"	2:21
8.	"I'm Gonna Kick Your Ass"	1:54
9.	"Black Train"	3:32
10.	"The Walker"	3:41
Total length:		29:02
