= A Night with Lou Reed =

Video by Lou Reed
- Released: 1984
- Recorded: February 28, 1983
- Venue: The Bottom Line, New York, NY
- Length: 60 minutes
- Label: RCA Video Productions

A Night with Lou Reed is a video by Lou Reed. It is drawn from the same tour as the album Live in Italy, which was released the following year.

The video is an intimate visual record of Reed's sold-out performance at The Bottom Line in New York City in 1983. For Reed, whose career began in Greenwich Village when he founded The Velvet Underground, this was a homecoming concert.

However, five numbers are missing: "Betrayed", "Sally Can't Dance", "Some Kinda Love/Sister Ray" and "Heroin". The 2000 DVD release is missing Reed's between-song repartee (for example his quoting of the "feeling lucky punk" speech from the Dirty Harry movies), while the 1984 RCA/Columbia Pictures VHS release, and the 1988 version broadcast on British TV, did include these.

== Track listing ==
All tracks by Lou Reed

1. "Sweet Jane"
2. "I'm Waiting for the Man"
3. "Martial Law"
4. "Don't Talk to Me about Work"
5. "Women"
6. "Waves of Fear"
7. "Walk on the Wild Side"
8. "Turn Out the Light"
9. "New Age"
10. "Kill Your Sons"
11. "Satellite of Love"
12. "White Light/White Heat"
13. "Rock & Roll"

== Personnel ==
- Lou Reed – guitar, vocals
- Robert Quine – guitar
- Fernando Saunders – bass
- Fred Maher – drums
- Clark Santee – director
- Boggs, Bill - producer
- Baker, Robert - producer
