= Moistboyz =

American rock band

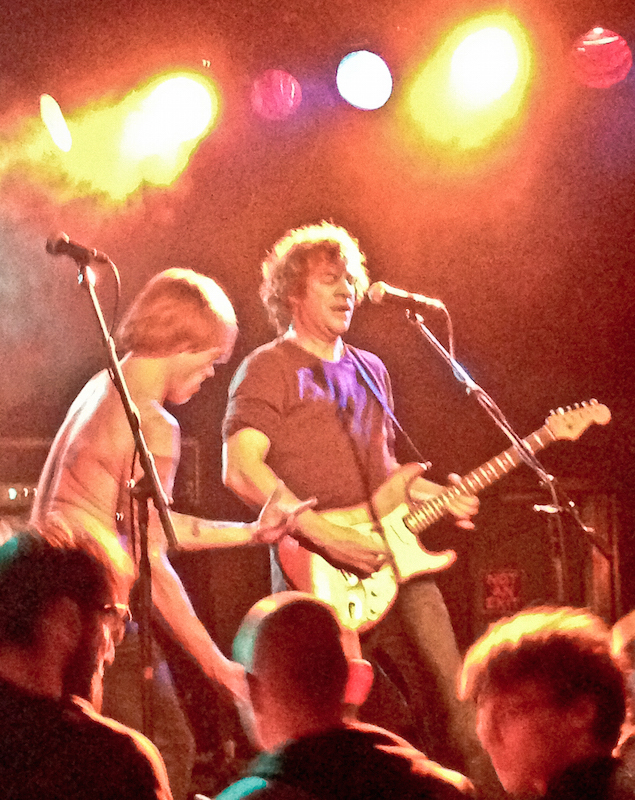
- Moistboyz performing in 2014

Background information
- Origin: New Hope, Pennsylvania, U.S.
- Genres: Rock, hard rock, punk rock, heavy metal, lo-fi
- Years active: 1991–present
- Labels: Grand Royal, Sanctuary, Chocodog, Schnitzel Records, Neverman Records
- Spinoff of: Ween; False Front
- Members: Dickie Moist: Mickey Moist
- Website: moistboyz.com

Moistboyz is an American hard rock band formed in New Hope, Pennsylvania in 1991 by Guy Heller and Mickey Melchiondo. Moistboyz music is typically fast-paced punk/metal, combining stream-of-consciousness lyrics with aggressive rock guitar riffs.

As in Melchiondo's band Ween, both he and Heller assume aliases: Mickey Moist and Dickie Moist.

== History ==
Melchiondo and Heller met when they were both 14. However, they didn't develop a musical partnership until 7 years later. While Melchiondo's other band Ween was working on their third album Pure Guava, Heller's band False Front was working out of the same farm house studio. During times when Melchiondo's Ween bandmate wasn't around, he and Heller would make music on their own. Describing the early sessions for recording with Heller, Melchiondo said “We started doing this really aggressive music and it was really getting us off, and we were really doing so much of it that we had enough to fill up a tape.” These sessions would result in the creation of the first Moistboyz record.

Moistboyz have released five studio records starting with the 1994 EP Moistboyz. A full-length album, Moistboyz II, followed in 1996. Recorded by Heller (vocals/lyrics) and Melchiondo (guitar/music) using drum machine and a lo-fi sensibility, both records were originally released on the Beastie Boys label, Grand Royal. In 2005, these first two records were combined and released as one album, Moistboyz I+II on Sanctuary Records, now on Chocodog Records.

In 2002, Moistboyz III was released on Mike Patton's label, Ipecac Records. This is the first Moistboyz record to feature songs with real drums, performed by Lou Croschetti.

Moistboyz IV was released in 2005 on Sanctuary Records. The album was mixed by Chris Shaw, features Claude Coleman, Jr. on drums, and bass by producer Andrew Weiss on "Fuck You". This album is significantly more politically charged than prior records: for example, the opening song, I Don't Give A Fuck Where The Eagle Flies is a direct response to John Ashcroft's song Let the Eagle Soar.

In 2013, the band announced they would release their 4th album, Moistboyz V, which was released on Heller and Melchiondo's label, Neverman Records, distributed by MVD Audio. Recording started in late 2012 in New Hope, PA and finished in Lago Vista, TX in early 2013. Melchiondo stated that this album was originally going to be made concurrently with his solo debut "The Deaner Album", but after a few weeks of working on both he decided to focus his energy on Moistboyz V instead and complete his solo album later.

Moistboyz V was produced and engineered by Melchiondo, and mixed by Stephen Haas. The album covers multiple musical styles, such as the southern rock-influenced Down on the Farm and the alt ballad "My Time to Die". Guest musicians include Chuck Treece (drums) on "Protect and Serve", "Medusa", "Garbageman" and Joe Kramer (guitar) on "Protect and Serve", "Chickendick", "Down on the Farm" and "My Time to Die".

== Members ==
- Guy Heller (Dickie Moist) – Lead Vocals
- Michael Melchiondo, Jr. (Mickey Moist) – Lead Guitar, Bass

=== Current touring members ===
- Stephen Haas
- Nick Oliveri
- Hoss Wright

=== Previous touring members ===
- Claude Coleman Jr.
- Dave Dreiwitz
- Bill Fowler
- Chris Harfenist
- Jeff Pinkus

== Discography ==
Albums

- Moistboyz (1994)
- Moistboyz II (1996)
- Moistboyz III (2002)
- Moistboyz IV (2005)
- Live Jihad (2006)
- Moistboyz V (2013)

Singles

- O.G. Simpson (1994)
- Second-Hand Smoker (1995)
- 1.0 (Fuck No) / Secondhand Smoker (2006)
- Paperboy / Angle To See (Split with Hello=Fire) (2013)
