= Valley Lodge (album) =

Studio album by Valley Lodge
- Released: August 16, 2005
- Genre: Power pop
- Length: 41:27
- Label: D-Text Records, Powerpop Academy

Valley Lodge chronology
Valley Lodge (2005)	Semester at Sea (2009)

Valley Lodge is the debut studio album by the American power pop band Valley Lodge. It was first released on August 1, 2005, on the band's official Bandcamp page as a purely digital album, then was released on August 16, 2005, by the record label D-Text Records and received a physical release on CD. It was re-released in Japan on September 26, 2008, by Powerpop Academy with three bonus tracks.

== Track listing ==
No.	Title	Length
1.	"Every Little Thing"	3:14
2.	"Sold"	3:20
3.	"If It Takes All Night"	4:33
4.	"All Of My Loving"	2:49
5.	"Over It"	3:11
6.	"Hey"	2:43
7.	"Naked City"	3:00
8.	"Twenty-first Century Man"	3:52
9.	"Hanging On"	4:13
10.	"Cruel"	3:23
11.	"That Song"	3:38
12.	"Planetarium"	4:04

== Japanese bonus tracks ==
No.	Title	Length
13.	"Comin' Round"	3:15
14.	"My Baby"	2:39
15.	"Barricade"	2:59

== Personnel ==
- Dave Hill - vocals, guitar
- John Kimbrough - vocals, guitar, additional instruments
- Phil Costello - vocals, bass guitar
- Rob Pfeiffer - drums
- Candice Belanoff - bass guitar
- Pete Kohl - backing vocals, additional percussion
- Ian Pai - additional percussion

== Notes ==
There is confusion as to the intended spelling of the 8th track on the album, "21st Centrury Man". On digital releases such as on Apple Music and Spotify it is spelt "Centrury", but on the Bandcamp release and physical CD release it is spelt "Century".

The track "All Of My Loving" received a music video, which features naked people as furniture. The music video was directed by longtime friends and collaborators Dave Hill and Rory Scovel, and was produced by Margaux Ravis.

The track "Naked City" was present on the 2011 videogame Test Drive Unlimited 2.

All of the bonus tracks on the Japanese re-release are present on their next album, Semester at Sea.
