= SuperMercado! =

Studio album by 2 Skinnee J's
- Released: 14 April 1998
- Genre: Hardcore rap
- Length: 42:50
- Label: Capricorn

2 Skinnee J's chronology
Riot Nrrrd (1998)	SuperMercado! (1998)	(718) (1998)

Professional ratings
Review scores
Source	Rating
AllMusic	4/5 stars
The Baltimore Sun	2.5/4 stars
The A.V. Club	Favorable link

SuperMercado! is an album by 2 Skinnee J's; it was released in 1998. A music video was made for the single, "Riot Nrrrd."

== Critical reception ==
The Washington Post thought that "J. Guevera and Special J, the New York City septet's frontmen, are extremely clever wordsmiths drawn to both cosmic themes and street scenes." The Baltimore Sun opined that "the raps themselves are heavy with references to disco-era pop culture ... funky and melodic tracks such as 'Riot Nrrrd', 'Wild Kingdom' and 'The Best' stand out from others that are at least entertaining if not so inspired."

AllMusic wrote that "occasionally, the group's kitschy pop culture references grate, but on the whole, the album is an impressive collection of hardcore rap that finds the middle ground between Public Enemy and Cypress Hill."

== Track listing ==
No.	Title	Length
1.	"Pluto"	3:20
2.	"Wild Kingdom"	3:49
3.	"The Best"	4:03
4.	"Ball Point Man"	3:00
5.	"In the Clutches of the Diabolical Sgt. Stiletto"	4:01
6.	"The Whammy"	3:08
7.	"You're a Champion"	3:55
8.	"(718)"	3:33
9.	"The Good, the Bad, & the Skinnee"	3:12
10.	"Riot Nrrrd"	3:58
11.	"Organic Machine"	3:58
12.	"Mindtrick"	3:06
Total length:		42:50
