= Girlfriend (Matthew Sweet song) =

Song by Matthew Sweet

Single by Matthew Sweet

from the album Girlfriend
- Released: 1991
- Genre: Rock; power pop
- Length: 3:40
- Label: Zoo Entertainment
- Songwriter: Matthew Sweet

Matthew Sweet singles chronology
"Divine Intervention" (1991)	"Girlfriend" (1991)	"I've Been Waiting" (1992)

"Girlfriend" is a 1991 song by American power pop musician Matthew Sweet, released as the lead single from his third album, Girlfriend. The song reached No. 4 on the Modern Rock Tracks chart and No. 10 on the Mainstream Rock Tracks chart in Billboard magazine.

== Background ==
"Girlfriend" was inspired by Sweet's divorce from his first wife, which occurred during the lead-up to the album's recording. Sweet recalled:

I got married when I was really young—19—and we were married for six years. By 1989, we'd moved out to Princeton, N.J., from New York City, so we could rent a whole house. It was awesome for me because I could do music without bothering anyone. The house was built in 1780, right on the edge of the Princeton Battlefield. I'd ride my bike in the backwoods all through there. But my wife at the time was restless. She felt like there was something she wanted to do. So she got some money from her dad and moved back to New York—got an apartment there. We hadn't really broken up, exactly, although we weren't getting along. It wasn't, like, a positive thing.

In July 2017, Sweet told WXRT radio in Chicago that a friend and musician on the album, Lloyd Cole, convinced him that it was a good song worthy of the album. Cole also helped inspire the song's title. He explained, "Matthew kept talking about 'good friend.' He'd just been recently separated from his wife, and I don't think he wanted to address the issue straight-on and say "girlfriend." And I said, 'For God's sake, just call it 'Girlfriend.''"

== Release ==
"Girlfriend" was released as the debut single from the album. Sweet recalled, "At the time, 'Girlfriend' wasn't an important song to me. It was just kind of a ditty. But if you were an artist at that time trying to sign to a label, they always used the track that's nothing like you as the single. It was actually my manager, Russell, who became obsessed that it could be on rock radio. And he really trumpeted that all through the thing."

In 1991, the music video for the song (directed by Frank Drucker) used clips from the anime film Space Adventure Cobra: The Movie.

The song has been used in the Britney Spears film Crossroads (2002) and the music video game Guitar Hero II (2006).

== Personnel ==
- Matthew Sweet – vocals, bass guitar, guitar
- Robert Quine – lead guitar
- Greg Leisz – guitar
- Fred Maher – drums

== Charts ==
Chart performance for "Girlfriend"
Chart (1992)	Peak position
Australia (ARIA)	71
US Alternative Airplay (Billboard)	4
US Mainstream Rock (Billboard)	10
