= Robert Quine =

American guitarist (1942–2004)

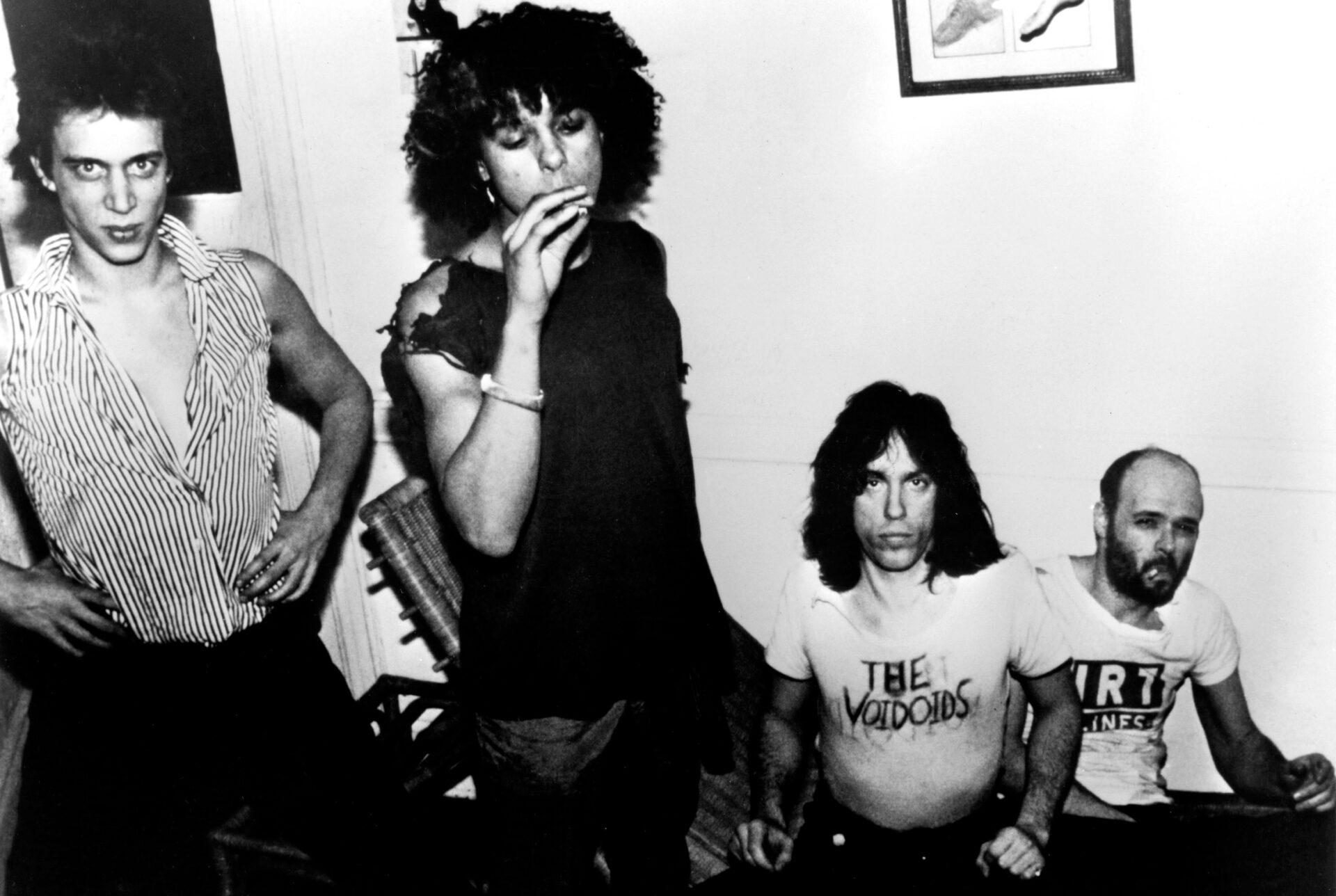
- Quine (right) as part of Richard Hell and the Voidoids in 1977

Background information
- Born: Robert Wolfe Quine; December 30, 1942; Akron, Ohio, U.S.
- Died: May 31, 2004 (aged 61) New York City, U.S.
- Genre: Rock
- Occupation: Musician
- Instrument: Electric guitar
- Years active: 1975–2004
- Labels: Sire; RCA; Infidelity; Lust/Unlust; Zoo Entertainment; Red Star; Tzadik
- Formerly of: Richard Hell and the Voidoids

Robert Wolfe Quine (December 30, 1942 – May 31, 2004) was an American guitarist. A native of Akron, Ohio, Quine worked with a wide range of musicians as a session musician. Critic Mark Deming wrote that "Quine's eclectic style embraced influences from jazz, rock, and blues players of all stripes, and his thoughtful technique and uncompromising approach led to rewarding collaborations with a number of visionary musicians."

His collaborators included Richard Hell & the Voidoids, Lou Reed (notably on The Blue Mask), Brian Eno, John Zorn, Ikue Mori, Marc Ribot, Marianne Faithfull (Strange Weather), Lloyd Cole, Matthew Sweet and Tom Waits.

Lester Bangs wrote that he was a "pivotal figure" and "the first guitarist to take the breakthroughs of early Lou Reed and James Williamson and work through them to a new, individual vocabulary, driven into odd places by obsessive attention to On the Corner-era Miles Davis." Quine was ranked 80th by Rolling Stone magazine's David Fricke in his list of "100 Greatest Guitarists".

== Early life ==
Quine was born in Akron, Ohio, the son of Rosalie (née Cohen) and Robert Cloyd Quine. He was a nephew of philosopher Willard Van Orman Quine. After graduating from Earlham College in 1965, Quine earned a law degree "out of inertia" from Washington University in St. Louis in 1968. Although he never practiced law and failed the California bar exam on several occasions, Quine wrote tax law textbooks for Englewood Cliffs, New Jersey–based publisher Prentice Hall for three years after moving to New York City in 1971 by virtue of his admission to the Missouri bar in 1969. Quine also enrolled at the Berklee School of Music at an indeterminate point without taking a degree.

== Career ==
In 1969, Quine made a series of cassette recordings of the Velvet Underground performing live in St. Louis and San Francisco, where he lived between late 1969 and 1971. These saw official release in 2001 by Polydor Records, titled Bootleg Series Volume 1: The Quine Tapes. In the liner notes, Quine writes: "I got a lot of pleasure and inspiration from these performances. As a guitar player, they were an important element in shaping what musical direction I wanted to take." While in St. Louis, he performed in a band called Bruce's Farm that specialized in Byrds covers.

Throughout his San Francisco years (coinciding with his attempts to pass the California bar exam), Quine "sort of began to come up with my own style," often performing under the influence of LSD; nevertheless, he disdained such psychedelic rock groups as Jefferson Airplane and the Grateful Dead. During this period, his influences included John Coltrane's Ascension (1966), Elvis Presley's singles for Sun Records, Fats Domino, Bo Diddley, James Burton, Mickey Baker and Little Richard. Upon moving to New York, he began to gravitate toward a new array of influences, including the 1972-1975 electric oeuvre of Miles Davis (especially the guitar sounds on 1972's On the Corner and 1975's Agharta), The Stooges' Raw Power (1973) and Brian Eno.

After leaving Prentice Hall to focus on his musical career in the mid-1970s, he worked at the Greenwich Village bookstore Cinemabilia with Richard Hell and Tom Verlaine, the co-founders of the influential punk band Television. Later, Hell invited him to join his new band The Voidoids. Hell's two Voidoid albums feature Quine's distinctive guitar work; guitarist Marc Ribot once said about Quine that "in terms of punk rock guitar soloing, [Quine] could definitely be called the inventor," while critic Ira Robbins describes his work as "stunning and underrated".

After The Voidoids broke up, Quine recorded with Lydia Lunch, Jody Harris and Material. From September 1979 to July 1980, Quine and Harris recorded various guitar improvisations with a drum machine. In 1981, some of those experiments were released as the Harris/Quine album, Escape. With Material bandmate Fred Maher, Quine recorded his only other solo album, Basic, released in 1984.

In the early 1980s, Lou Reed drafted Quine to join his group. He appeared on The Blue Mask (1982), widely regarded as one of Reed's best albums. The Reed-Quine guitar work crafted interlocking duels that blur the lines between rhythm and leads. Reed's 1983 album Legendary Hearts featured most of the same group, but Quine eventually quit due to tensions with Reed, exacerbated when Reed mixed down or entirely removed most of Quine's guitar parts on Legendary Hearts. Quine claimed that when he got his advance copy of the album, he was so disgusted by this, he smashed the cassette into "smithereens" with a hammer. Reed persuaded Quine to rejoin for a world tour, which is documented on the video A Night with Lou Reed (1983) and the album Live in Italy (1984); Quine disliked touring, but agreed to the tour for financial reasons. He ended his partnership with Reed for good in 1984.

Although Quine frequently collaborated with Eno from the late 1970s to the mid-1980s (coinciding with the producer's residency in New York), "almost none of [their work] ever came out." In a 1997 interview with Perfect Sound Forever, he claimed to have introduced Eno to "He Loved Him Madly," a thirty-two minute 1974 Miles Davis song that Eno has cited as a pivotal influence in his development of ambient music.

Throughout the 1980s, Quine made appearances as a session player on records by Tom Waits, John Zorn, Marianne Faithfull and Scritti Politti. In the late 1980s and early 1990s, Quine began collaborations with a few musicians who would introduce him to new audiences, and who would raise his profile a bit. Saxophonist/composer John Zorn hired Quine for several experimental projects. He appeared on They Might Be Giants' 1994 album John Henry, and he also worked with pop songwriters/singers Lloyd Cole and Matthew Sweet during this period. Sweet's biggest hit song, "Girlfriend," is anchored by Quine's frenetic, squealing guitar work.

== Death ==
After the death of his wife Alice in August 2003, Quine died by suicide due to a heroin overdose in his New York home on May 31, 2004.

== Discography ==
=== Solo ===
- Escape (with Jody Harris) (1981)
- Basic (with Fred Maher) (1984)
- Come Together: Guitar Tribute to the Beatles, Vol. 2 (with Jody Harris) (1995)

=== Richard Hell and the Voidoids ===
- Blank Generation (1977)
- Destiny Street (1982)
- R.I.P.: The ROIR Sessions (1984)
- Funhunt (Live at CBGB & Max's) (1990)
- Oh (2000)

He is also featured in the 1980 film Blank Generation.

=== Richard Hell ===
- Time (2002)

=== Lou Reed ===
- The Blue Mask (1982)
- Legendary Hearts (1983)
- Live in Italy (1984)
- Between Thought and Expression: The Lou Reed Anthology (1992)

=== Matthew Sweet ===
- Earth (1989)
- Girlfriend (1991)
- Altered Beast (1993)
- Son of Altered Beast (1994)
- 100% Fun (1995)

=== Lloyd Cole ===
- Lloyd Cole (1990)
- Don't Get Weird on Me Babe (1991)
- Love Story (1995)
- Etc. (2001)

=== Material ===
- Temporary Music (1981)
- Red Tracks (1985)
- Secret Life (1998)
- Best of Material (1999)

=== John Zorn ===
- The Big Gundown (Elektra/Nonesuch, 1984)
- Spillane (Elekra/Nonesuch, 1986)
- Filmworks 1986-1990 (Toys Factory, 1992)
- Filmworks III: 1990-1995 (Toys Factory, 1996)
- Filmworks V: Tears of Ecstasy (Tzadik, 1996)
- Filmworks IV: S&M + More (Tzadik, 1997)
- Filmworks VII: Cynical Hysterie Hour (Tzadik, 1997)
- Great Jewish Music: Burt Bacharach (Tzadik, 1997)
- The Bribe (Tzadik, 1998)
- Godard/Spillane (Tzadik, 1999)
- Taboo & Exile (Tzadik, 1999)

=== Other artists ===
- Let It Blurt – Lester Bangs (1977)
- Queen of Siam – Lydia Lunch (1979)
- Off White – James White & the Blacks (1979)
- Get Crazy – film soundtrack (1983)
- Rain Dogs – Tom Waits (1985)
- Cupid & Psyche 85 – Scritti Politti (1985)
- Dirtdish – Wiseblood (1986)
- Strange Weather – Marianne Faithfull (1987)
- Quilt – The Shams (1991)
- Dim Stars – Dim Stars (1992)
- Nerve Net – Brian Eno (1992)
- To Hell With Love – Suzanne Rhatigan (1992)
- Weird Nightmare: Meditations on Mingus – Hal Willner (1992)
- Bedbugs – The Odds (1993)
- I Don't Like Myself – Sion (1993)
- John Henry – They Might Be Giants (1994)
- El Abrazo Del Erizo Mikel Erentxun (1995)
- Love is Wild... Life is Violent... – Katy Clements (1996)
- Don't Tell Me – Eddie Skuller (1996)
- Valdun—Voices of Rumantsch- Corin Curschellas (1997)
- Painted Desert – Ikue Mori (with Marc Ribot) (1997)
- Vibe of Life – Reiss (1998)
- Cold Tube – Kazuyoshi Saito (2000)
- Singles: Individually Wrapped – The Odds (2000)
- Songs – Sion (2000)
- Michael Maxwell – Michael Maxwell (2000)
- dust! – Dusty Wright (2000)
- Presents Beyond Cyberpunk – Wayne Kramer (2001)
- Bait and Switch – Andre Williams (2001)
- Bootleg Series Volume 1: The Quine Tapes – The Velvet Underground (2001) (Recorded by Quine, though he did not play on it himself.)
- Lustro – Michael DuClos (2002)
- Cross-Eyed and Bow-Legged – Tom Clark and the High Action Boys (2002)
- The Good, the Bad, and the Ugly – Sonny Vincent (2003)
- Nowhere Land – Kazuyoshi Saito (2003)
- Lys Guillorn – Lys Guillorn (2003)
