= 100% Fun =

Studio album by Matthew Sweet
- Released: Vinyl: February 28, 1995; CD, Cassette: March 14, 1995
- Genre: Alternative rock
- Length: 41:06
- Label: Zoo Entertainment
- Producer: Brendan O'Brien

Matthew Sweet chronology
Son of Altered Beast (1994)	100% Fun (1995)	Blue Sky on Mars (1997)

Singles from 100% Fun
- 1. "We're the Same" Released: 1995; 2. "Sick of Myself" Released: 1995

100% Fun is the fifth album by alternative rock musician Matthew Sweet. It was released on Zoo Entertainment in 1995.

== Release ==
Professional ratings
Review scores
Source	Rating
AllMusic	4.5/5 stars
Chicago Tribune	3/4 stars
Entertainment Weekly	B+
The Guardian	4/4 stars
NME	6/10
Q	4/5 stars
Rolling Stone	4/5 stars
Select	4/5
Spin	8/10
The Village Voice	B+

The album was met with moderate commercial success and favorable reviews. The single "Sick of Myself" reached #2 on the Billboard Modern Rock chart and appeared on the top 100 pop song charts of the day. Critic David Browne of Entertainment Weekly, who included 100% Fun on his year's-best list, wrote in his review that it "makes you feel as if a good pop hook can solve any crisis." The title of the album was derived from Kurt Cobain's 1994 suicide note.

== Reissue ==
In 2018, independent vinyl reissue label Intervention Records announced that it would be releasing Artist-Approved 2 LP Expanded Editions of 100% Fun, Altered Beast, and Girlfriend. The three albums will also be released on CD/SACD. Intervention also announced a first time on vinyl reissue of Son of Altered Beast.

== In popular culture ==
The song "Sick of Myself" was covered by Bowling for Soup on their album Bowling for Soup Goes to the Movies. In 2005, indie rock band Death Cab For Cutie also performed a cover of the song for NPR's World Cafe.

"Everything Changes" was featured in the 1995 film The Babysitters Club. It came on during a tense moment in the film, when 13-year-old Stacy has to come to grips with her diabetes, as well as get over the 18-year-old she has a crush on. The song plays dramatically after she has lied to her crush about being 18.

"Sick of Myself" appeared on an episode of Hindsight, as well as an episode of 'Your Friends & Neighbors'.

== Track listing ==
All tracks are written by Matthew Sweet

No.	Title	Length
1.	"Sick of Myself"	3:38
2.	"Not When I Need It"	3:27
3.	"We're the Same"	3:03
4.	"Giving It Back"	3:28
5.	"Everything Changes"	3:49
6.	"Lost My Mind"	4:43
7.	"Come to Love"	2:26
8.	"Walk Out"	3:24
9.	"I Almost Forgot"	2:54
10.	"Super Baby"	3:15
11.	"Get Older"	2:46
12.	"Smog Moon"	4:13

Japanese CD Bonus Tracks
No.	Title	Length
13.	"Sense of Adventure"	4:36
14.	"Slowly"	3:34

== Personnel ==
- Matthew Sweet – vocals, electric rhythm guitar (1–8, 10–12), electric bass, acoustic piano (2, 9, 11), electric lead guitar (3, 11), acoustic guitar (3, 8, 9), electric 12-string rhythm guitar (3), theremin (6), electric piano (9), mini synthesizer (11), RMI electric piano (11), electric harpsichord (11)
- Brendan O'Brien – electric rhythm guitar, (1, 10) electric lead guitar (2), acoustic piano (4, 5, 12), electric piano (5), Mellotron (6, 10), clavinet (7), harpsichord (8), acoustic guitar (8), slide guitar (8)
- Richard Lloyd – electric lead guitar (1, 4–6, 8), electric rhythm guitar (11)
- Robert Quine – electric lead guitar (2, 6, 10) electric rhythm guitar (3, 7, 9)
- Greg Leisz – lap steel guitar (2, 12), pedal steel guitar (5, 9), mandolin (8)
- Ric Menck – drums (1, 3, 6, 9, 12)
- Stuart Johnson – drums (2, 4, 5, 7, 8, 10, 11)

=== Production ===
- Scott Byron – A&R
- Bud Scoppa – A&R
- Brendan O'Brien – producer, mixing
- Nick Didia – engineer
- Caram Costanzo – second engineer
- Lee Hammond – art direction
- Bob Ludwig – mastering at Gateway Mastering (Portland, Maine)
- Matthew Sweet – cover photography
- Jeff Bender – photography
- Russell Carter Artist Management Ltd. – management

== Charts ==
Chart performance for 100% Fun
Chart (1995)	Peak position
Australian Albums (ARIA)	75
Canada Albums (RPM)	41
US Billboard 200	65
