= Live in Italy (Lou Reed album) =

Live album by Lou Reed
- Released: January 1984
- Recorded: September 7, 1983, Verona; September 10, 1983, Rome
- Genre: Rock
- Length: 75:19
- Label: RCA Records

Lou Reed chronology
Legendary Hearts (1983)	Live in Italy (1984)	New Sensations (1984)

Lou Reed chronology
Different Times: Lou Reed in the '70s (1996)	Live in Concert (1996; reissue)	Ecstasy (2000)

Live In Italy is an album by American musician Lou Reed recorded live over two nights in September 1983 (on the 7th in Verona and on the 10th, at the ruins of Circus Maximus, in Rome) using the Rolling Stones Mobile Unit. It was issued on vinyl only in Germany, the United Kingdom and Japan. At the time, Reed and his band were on a world tour to promote the album Legendary Hearts. A live video, A Night with Lou Reed, filmed at a New York concert, was also released to coincide with the album. The video omitted the songs "Betrayed", "Sally Can't Dance", "Average Guy" and "Some Kinda Love"/"Sister Ray" from the 10th show, while adding "Don't Talk to Me About Work", "Women", "Turn Out the Light" and "New Age" from the 7th.

In 1996, the album was reissued under the title Live in Concert.

== Reception ==
Professional ratings
Review scores
Source	Rating
AllMusic	4.5/5 stars
Chicago Tribune	4/4 stars
The Philadelphia Inquirer	5/5 stars
The Village Voice	B+

From contemporary reviews, the NME wondered why the majority of the songs came from Reed's Velvet Underground years, asking if it was, "because in Robert Quine, Lou Reed has at last found another simpatico guitarist, and he's just delighted to spar with him on "Sister Ray" and all those other great old songs which, frustratingly, just haven't been played right for years?" Ken Tucker of The Philadelphia Inquirer gave Live in Italy a five out of five star rating, declaring it "a wonderful encapsulation of Reed's career" finding Reed's vocals "tart and witty" and that "his phrasing loses very little subtlety in this huge-arena context." Tucker also praised Robert Quine who "delivers some of the finest, roughest, most caustic rock guitar playing I've ever heard."

== Track listing ==
All songs written by Lou Reed except as indicated.

=== Side one ===
1. "Sweet Jane" (3:46)
2. "I'm Waiting for My Man" (4:00)
3. "Martial Law" (4:06)
4. "Satellite of Love" (5:06)

=== Side two ===
1. "Kill Your Sons" (5:35)
2. "Betrayed" (3:05)
3. "Sally Can't Dance" (3:24)
4. "Waves of Fear" (3:16)
5. "Average Guy" (2:54)

=== Side three ===
1. "White Light/White Heat" (3:10)
2. "Some Kinda Love / Sister Ray" (Reed, John Cale, Sterling Morrison, Maureen Tucker) (15:30)

=== Side four ===
1. "Walk on the Wild Side" (4:28)
2. "Heroin" (8:34)
3. "Rock & Roll" (6:10)

== Personnel ==
Credits are adapted from the album's liner notes.

- Lou Reed – vocals, guitar
- Fred Maher – drums
- Robert Quine – guitar
- Fernando Saunders – bass guitar

Production

- Pietro Di Silvestro – artwork
- Rossella Antonelli – cover artwork
- Fabio Berruti – Artwork, Graphic Design
- Piero Nannucci – mastering and cutting engineering, RCA Studios, Rome
- Guido Harari – Photography
- Luciano Viti – photography
- Antonio La Rosa – remastering
- Toshikazu Ohtaka – liner notes
- Carlo Basile – executive coordinator, RCA Italiana
