= Systech Corporation =

- Type: Private Limited
- Industry: Industrial Automation
- Founded: 1981
- Headquarters: San Diego, California.
- Key people: D. Mark Fowler (CEO), L. Vaughn Watts, Jr.

Systech Corporation (Systech) is a California corporation founded in 1981 and headquartered in San Diego, California.

== Product lines ==
Systech Corporation designs and manufactures a variety of network conversion gateways, device servers and switch products for Internet Protocol (IP) communications and in existing non-IP based systems and networks. The product lines also include payment gateways, dial to IP converters, cellular gateways, remote access and management software, remote access software and control automation software.

The SysLINK M2Mgateway was awarded M2M Evolution Magazine's 2014 Evolution Product of the Year, issued to Industry Innovators. The SysLINK Gateway is able to communicate and bridge a wide variety of protocols and standards while providing local intelligence to analyze, filter and take action.

SysSCRIPT enables customers to interconnect Industrial IoT devices without the need for software development teams. SysSCRIPT enabled Systech to win the Best Gateway Strategy Award in IoT Evolution's Eighth "Battle of the Platforms" on August 17, 2015.

== Markets ==
The product lines serve the Internet of Things (IoT) market with particular emphasis on the Machine to Machine (M2M) submarket and the larger Industrial Internet of Things (IIOT) submarket. Over 350,000 Systech devices are installed worldwide.

== Interoperability ==
Systech is a member of the Open Connectivity Foundation (OCF) whose objective is connecting the 25+ billion Internet of Things (IoT) devices across multiple platforms and Operating Systems using a common, interoperable approach that includes security. A recent World Economic Forum report notes the Lack of Interoperability or Standards is the greatest barrier inhibiting business from adopting the Industrial Internet (of Things) along with Security.

Systech was an early adopter when it completed certification of the SysLINK M2M Gateway as ThingWorx Ready as part of the ThingWorx Partner Program before PTC acquired ThingWorx.

== Notable people ==
- D. Mark Fowler is President and CEO of Systech. Previously Fowler was a Board Member of Amistar, President and General Manager of ITT's Business Systems Group and Vice President of ITT's Information Systems Division. In 1983, he co-founded, as Chairman and President, Zaisan a Venture Capital funded manufacturer of integrated voice / personal computer workstations. Fowler started his technical career at Texas Instruments (TI), leaving after 12-years. Fowler supervised the 1981 program wherein the original LCD-based notebook computer was conceived and developed into a working prototype (T.O.P.S.) which became the forerunner for the TI Pro-Lite portable computer. TI's portable / notebook computer line was sold to Acer in 1997.
- L. Vaughn Watts, Jr., former Technical Fellow at both Texas Instruments (TI) and Dell has developed a deep relationship with Systech and is author or co-author of a number of patent applications on Systech's behalf. Watts is author or co-author of over 15 patents for TI and Dell.
