= Volumizer (album) =

Studio album by 2 Skinnee J's
- Released: April 2002
- Genre: Hip hop
- Length: 46:29
- Label: Volcano Entertainment
- Producers: Mickey Petralia, Michael Bradford

2 Skinnee J's chronology
Stockholm Love (2000)	Volumizer (2002)	Live Bootleg! (2001)

Professional ratings
Review scores
Source	Rating
Allmusic	4/5 stars

Volumizer is 2 Skinnee J's second major-label album. It was originally completed and set to be released on September 12, 2000, through Capricorn Records. However, once Capricorn was absorbed by Volcano Records, Volumizer was shelved. The album was finally released in April 2002. Songs from the original track listing cut (including original single "Stockholm Love," which was released on CD singles in 2000), and new songs added.

The song "3 Minutes" was used as the entrance theme for former WWE tag team 3-Minute Warning, a team consisting of wrestlers Matt "Rosey" Anoa'i and Eddie "Jamal" Fatu. A music video was shot for the song and single, "Grown Up," featuring comedian Andy Dick. Following poor album sales, 2 Skinnee J's were dropped from Volcano Records.

== Track listing ==
No.	Title	Length
1.	"Horns of Destruction"	3:53
2.	"3 Minutes"	4:32
3.	"Grown Up"	3:57
4.	"Girl With the World in Her Eyes"	4:13
5.	"Big Beat Evangelists"	3:25
6.	"Brew Ha Ha!"	3:40
7.	"Lost and Found"	3:35
8.	"Pass the Buck"	2:32
9.	"Lemon Drop"	3:06
10.	"Sugar & Candy"	4:13
11.	"Loud Neighbor"	3:54
12.	"Coming Home"	5:24
Total length:		46:29

Original
No.	Title	Length
1.	"Horns of Destruction"	3:53
2.	"3 Minutes"	4:32
3.	"Girl With the World in Her Eyes"	4:13
4.	"Stockholm Love"	3:18
5.	"Big Beat Evangelists"	3:25
6.	"Brew Ha Ha!"	3:40
7.	"Pass the Buck"	2:32
8.	"Secret Frequency"	3:12
9.	"Sugar & Candy"	4:13
10.	"Loud Neighbor"	3:54
11.	"Coming Home"	5:24

Japanese edition
No.	Title	Length
1.	"Horns of Destruction"	3:53
2.	"3 Minutes"	4:32
3.	"Grown Up"	3:57
4.	"Girl With the World in Her Eyes"	4:13
5.	"Big Beat Evangelists"	3:25
6.	"Brew Ha Ha!"	3:40
7.	"Lost and Found"	3:35
8.	"Pass the Buck"	2:32
9.	"Lemon Drop"	3:06
10.	"Sugar & Candy"	4:13
11.	"Loud Neighbor"	3:54
12.	"Coming Home"	5:24
13.	"Stockholm Love"	3:18
14.	"Secret Frequency"	3:12
