= In Reverse =

Studio album by Matthew Sweet
- Released: October 12, 1999
- Recorded: May – June 1999
- Studios: Cello Studios (Hollywood, California)
- Genre: Alternative rock
- Length: 55:26
- Label: Volcano Records
- Producers: Matthew Sweet; Greg Leisz; Fred Maher; Jim Scott

Matthew Sweet chronology
Blue Sky on Mars (1997)	In Reverse (1999)	Time Capsule: Best of 90/00 (2000)

Professional ratings
Review scores
Source	Rating
Allmusic	4/5 stars
Rolling Stone	3.5/5 stars
The A.V. Club	(favorable)

In Reverse is the seventh album by alternative rock musician Matthew Sweet. It was released on Volcano Entertainment in 1999.

== Cover ==
The upside-down cover of the album features an oil painting by artist Margaret Keane, and the liner notes are in reverse.

== Release ==
The album was met with little commercial success, but with very favorable reviews. Rolling Stone wrote that the "songs are such perfect little valentines that the production just brings them larger to life". Entertainment Weekly gave the album an A−, noting the "intriguing side trips into forests of thick guitar chords". CMJ wrote that the songs "transcend museum-quality affectation and exude a multitude of bittersweet charms.". Critic Stephen Thompson of The A.V. Club wrote that In Reverse "finds [Sweet] once again at his best", adding that "its 14 tracks are uniformly strong, with muscular rockers ("Split Personality," "Write Your Own Song") competing for attention with smooth, lush, sugary fare ("If Time Permits," the knockout ballads "Trade Places" and "Worse To Live"). Stephen Thomas Erlewine, of Allmusic, praised the record's "cavernous reverb", and wrote that "this rich music is a personal interpretation of lush chamber pop and psychedelia, giving a musical counterpart for lovely melancholy songs of heartbreak and disillusion". Jerry McCulley of Amazon.com wrote, "Epic in scope and harmonically intoxicating," adding, "this is an album by an artist measuring the distance between his reach and his grasp, his good sense and self-indulgence, his confidence growing with every back-to-the future track."

== Details ==
The song "Faith in You" was featured in the film Drive Me Crazy. For the nine minute thirty-seven seconds closing song "Thunderstorm", Sweet combined three bass guitar lines and other selections, such as "If Time Permits", hint of sound/song reversal as implied in the album's title.

== Track listing ==
All tracks are written by Matthew Sweet.

CD
No.	Title	Length
1.	"Millennium Blues"	2:52
2.	"If Time Permits"	3:03
3.	"Beware My Love"	3:51
4.	"Faith in You"	3:32
5.	"Hide"	4:02
6.	"Future Shock"	3:22
7.	"Split Personality"	4:19
8.	"I Should Never Have Let You Know"	2:48
9.	"Trade Places"	2:57
10.	"What Matters"	4:13
11.	"Write Your Own Song"	3:03
12.	"Worse to Live"	5:04
13.	"Untitled"	2:43
14.	"Thunderstorm"	9:37
Total length:		55:26

=== Bonus tracks ===
UK release
No.	Title	Length
15.	"Thunderstorm (demo)"	2:32
16.	"Even from My Eyes (demo)"	2:13
17.	"Yes (demo)"	2:57
18.	"Day in the Sun (demo)"	3:35
Total length:		66:43

== Personnel ==
- Matthew Sweet – vocals, electric guitar (1–4, 6–8, 10, 11, 14, 15), bass (1, 3, 6, 7, 9–11, 13–15), synthesizers (3), acoustic guitar (3, 14, 15) percussion (4), acoustic piano (5, 12), electric 12-string guitar (6, 10), electric baritone guitar (7), 12-string acoustic guitar (10, 14, 15), organ (14, 15)
- Greg Kurstin – organ (1, 8, 12, 14), tack piano (2, 5, 14), electric harpsichord (14)
- John Ginty – acoustic piano (2, 8, 11, 14), electric piano (10), tack piano (12), organ (14), electric harpsichord solo (14)
- Brian Kehew – organ (2), tack piano (8), electric harpsichord (8, 12, 14), electric piano (14)
- Pamelia Kurstin – theremin (2, 3, 5, 8, 12, 14)
- Jamie Muhoberac – Roland Jupiter-8 (6), organ (6), acoustic piano (9), electric piano (9)
- Greg Leisz – electric guitar (1, 9, 12), 12-string acoustic guitar (2), electric lead guitar (2, 8), acoustic guitar (5, 6, 8, 13, 14), pedal steel guitar (5, 13), electric 12-string rhythm guitar (6), electric 12-string guitar (9), electric lead 12-string guitars (10), lap steel guitar (14)
- Paul Chastain – acoustic guitar (2, 8, 12, 14)
- Rick Cunha – acoustic guitar (2, 8, 12, 14)
- Peter Phillips – electric guitar (2, 8, 12, 14), electric lead guitar (3, 4, 6, 7, 11, 14), electric rhythm guitar (3)
- Carol Kaye – electric bass (2, 8, 12, 14), bass (5)
- Tony Marsico – acoustic bass (2, 8, 12, 14)
- Ric Menck – drums (1–4, 7–14), percussion (10)
- Fred Maher – drums (2, 14), percussion (4, 9, 10, 13)
- Jim Keltner – drums (5), percussion (5)
- Victor Bisetti – percussion (2, 8, 12, 14)
- Don Heffington – percussion (2, 8, 12, 14)
- Bruce Fowler – trombone (1, 12, 14), euphonium (12, 14)
- Walt Fowler – trumpet (1, 12), flugelhorn (12, 14)

=== Production ===
- Greg Leisz – producer
- Fred Maher – producer
- Matthew Sweet – producer
- Jim Scott – producer, engineer, mixing
- Mike Scotella – second engineer
- Bob Ludwig – mastering at Gateway Mastering (Portland, Maine)
- Nick Gamma – art direction, design
- Elizabeth Moore – set design
- Johnny Buzzerio – photography
- Margaret Keane – cover painting
- Christine Ehrlich – stylist
- Miriam Vukich – stylist
- Russell Carter Artist Management Ltd. – management
