= Sons of Elvis =

- Origin: Cleveland, Ohio
- Genres: Alternative rock; post-grunge
- Years active: 1988–1995
- Label: Priority Records

Sons of Elvis was an alternative rock group active in the early 1990s, best known for their hit single, "Formaldehyde".

== History ==
Sons of Elvis was formed by musicians from Cleveland, Ohio. After winning some local airplay in Cleveland and building a small following, they relocated to New York City so that three of the members could attend college, at Fordham University in the Bronx. While there, two of the members also wrote a well received weekly music column, Ear Wax, for Fordham's alternative newspaper, The Paper. After a bidding war, they signed to small independent record label American Empire to release Glodean, but the label went out of business quickly after signing them. Priority Records then picked up the group and released the Mrs. White disc (consisting mainly of tracks from Glodean) before re-releasing Glodean in 1995. Lead single "Formaldehyde" received airplay at radio and on MTV, and was also featured on the soundtrack of the feature film Higher Learning, by director John Singleton. Glodean peaked at No. 23 on Billboard's Top Heatseekers chart in 1995.

== Discography ==
- Mrs. White (Priority Records, 1994)
- Glodean (Priority, 1995)

== Members ==
- John Borland (vocals)
- Tim Parnin (guitar)
- Dave Hill (bass, guitar)
- Pat Casa (drums)
