= Altered Beast (album) =

Studio album by Matthew Sweet
- Released: 13 July 1993
- Recorded: January – February 1993
- Studio: The Sound Factory (Hollywood, California); The Village Recorder (Los Angeles, California); Maida Vale Studios (London, UK)
- Genre: Alternative rock, power pop
- Length: 57:32
- Label: Zoo Entertainment
- Producer: Richard Dashut and Matthew Sweet

Matthew Sweet chronology
Girlfriend (1991)	Altered Beast (1993)	Son of Altered Beast (1994)

Singles from Altered Beast
- 1. "The Ugly Truth" Released: 1993; 2. "Time Capsule" Released: 1993; 3. "Devil with the Green Eyes" Released: 1993 (Europe only)

Professional ratings
Review scores
Source	Rating
Allmusic	4/5 stars
Christgau's Consumer Guide	(3-star Honorable Mention)
Entertainment Weekly	A−
Rolling Stone	3/5 stars

Altered Beast is the fourth album by alternative rock musician Matthew Sweet. It was released on Zoo Entertainment in 1993.

== Recording ==
Some of the album's guest musicians include: drummers Mick Fleetwood, Jody Stephens, and Pete Thomas; guitarists Richard Lloyd, Robert Quine, and Ivan Julian; keyboardist Nicky Hopkins,; and violinist Byron Berline. The track "Intro" is a clip from the Malcolm McDowell film Caligula.

The title of the album is borrowed from the arcade game Altered Beast. Sweet told Spin magazine that the title meant "whatever is inside you that someday might explode, and maybe you don't know it's there", which he found similar to the game, in which "you have to find these little power-up things, and when you eat them you become the Altered Beast, this other creature that's really powerful and violent". The cover of the album, produced in five different colored versions (yellow, blue, green, orange and purple), features a dinosaur logo. Originally, Sweet wanted to use the logo of the Japanese delivery company Yamato Transport on the cover, but was denied permission; Sweet has described the dinosaur design as a "consolation prize".

== Release ==
Initial responses to the record were mixed, with Rolling Stone writing that it had "inspiring moments; the problem is finding them." AllMusic agreed that the album is "all over the place", yet noted that "it takes a bit of time for all of it to make sense, but after a few listens, it falls together."

== Reissue ==
In 2018, independent vinyl reissue label Intervention Records announced that it would be releasing Artist-Approved 2 LP Expanded Editions of 100% Fun, Altered Beast, and Girlfriend. The three albums will also be released on CD/SACD. Intervention also announced a first time on vinyl reissue of Son of Altered Beast.

== Track listing ==
All songs written by Matthew Sweet; with the exception of Track 8, "Intro" excerpts from the movie "Caligula".

1. "Dinosaur Act" - 4:05
2. "Devil with the Green Eyes" - 4:43
3. "The Ugly Truth" - 3:18
4. "Time Capsule" - 3:56
5. "Someone to Pull the Trigger" - 3:55
6. "Knowing People" - 4:25
7. "Life Without You" - 2:18
8. "Intro" - 0:46
9. "Ugly Truth Rock" - 2:58
10. "Do It Again" - 3:33
11. "In Too Deep" - 3:54
12. "Reaching Out" - 4:00
13. "Falling" - 4:50
14. "What Do You Know?" - 4:27
15. "Evergreen" - 4:23 (5:50 track length includes a hidden outro track)

== Personnel ==
- Matthew Sweet – vocals, electric guitars (1–7, 9–14), 12-string bass (1, 6), dinosaur noises (1), acoustic guitars (2–5, 7, 10, 11, 13–15), bass guitar (2–5, 7, 9–14), baritone guitar (12)
- Nicky Hopkins – acoustic piano (10–12, 15)
- Robert Quine – lead guitar (1–4, 10, 12, 14), rhythm guitars (7), electric guitars (15)
- Ivan Julian – lead guitar (5, 7)
- Richard Lloyd – lead guitar (6, 9, 11, 13)
- Greg Leisz – lap steel guitar (2), acoustic guitar (14), National duolian (14), pedal steel guitar (15)
- Ric Menck – drums (1, 3, 10, 11)
- Pete Thomas – drums (2, 4, 5, 14)
- Ron Pangborn – drums (6, 9)
- Jody Stephens – drums (7)
- Mick Fleetwood – drums (12)
- Fred Maher – drums (13)
- Byron Berline – fiddle (3)

=== Production ===
- Scott Byron – A&R
- Richard Dashut – producer
- Matthew Sweet – producer, arrangements, mixing
- Lloyd Puckitt – recording, mixing
- Barry Goldberg – additional engineer
- Tom Nellan – additional engineer
- Chris Littell – additional engineer
- Stephen Marcussen – mastering at Precision Mastering (Hollywood, California)
- Lee Hammond – art direction
- E.J. Camp – photography
- Art Shoji – typography
- Russell Carter Artist Management Ltd. – management

== Music videos ==
1. *The Ugly Truth", directed by Matthew Sweet
2. *Time Capsule", directed by Douglas Gayeton (Satellite Films)

== Charts ==
Chart performance for Altered Beast
Chart (1993)	Peak position
Australian Albums (ARIA)	54
New Zealand Albums (RMNZ)	50
US Billboard 200	75
