= Girlfriend (Matthew Sweet album) =

Studio album by Matthew Sweet
- Released: October 22, 1991
- Recorded: 1990
- Studios: Axis Studios and Battery Studios (New York City, New York)
- Genres: Power pop; alternative rock
- Length: 60:19
- Label: Zoo Entertainment
- Producers: Fred Maher; Matthew Sweet

Matthew Sweet chronology
Earth (1989)	Girlfriend (1991)	Altered Beast (1993)

Singles from Girlfriend
- 1. "Divine Intervention" Released: 1991; 2. "Girlfriend" Released: 1992; 3. "I've Been Waiting" Released: 1992

Girlfriend is the third studio album by American alternative rock musician Matthew Sweet. It was released on October 22, 1991, by Zoo Entertainment. The album was a commercial and critical breakthrough for Sweet, eventually being certified gold by the RIAA.

The record features contributions from guitarists Robert Quine and Richard Lloyd, and was preceded by the title track, which became a top-five hit on the Modern Rock Tracks chart. Retrospectively, the album has been praised as a landmark of 1990s power pop; Paste ranked it at number 61 on its list of "The 90 Best Albums of the 1990s".

== Recording ==
Sweet recorded Girlfriend in 1990, following his divorce. He later said to Rolling Stone, "It's funny how the album ended up showing everything I needed to feel. Everything I needed as an antidote is there." He told Entertainment Weekly, "People say, 'This is your big breakup record – will you still be able to write good songs?' I'm sure I'll be just as depressed at some other point in my life."

The album includes guitar contributions from Richard Lloyd, formerly of the band Television, and Robert Quine. Michael Azerrad of Rolling Stone wrote of the sound: "Equal parts anguish and elation, the heavily autobiographical Girlfriend plays Sweet's impeccable pop sense of noisy, passionate guitar work, recalling the Beatles' Revolver, early Neil Young and Television."

The album's production style was very stripped down and sparse, with wide stereo separation and no reverb used on any tracks. On some tracks, notably "Divine Intervention," the drums were highly compressed and panned completely to one side of the stereo spectrum, in a move reminiscent of George Martin and the Beatles. The individual musicians' tracks were recorded whole in a few takes, with the notable exception of Quine's lead parts, which were pieced together from multiple takes. According to album engineer Jim Rondinelli, "Bob would get something going in the first couple of takes, and then he’d get really down on himself and go through this incredible self-loathing. On the fourth or fifth take, all this additional fire and anger would come out, and he’d take it out on his instrument. Then he’d be emotionally and physically exhausted."

== Album details ==
The cover of the album features a photograph of actress Tuesday Weld from the late 1950s. Originally called Nothing Lasts, the album was re-titled following objections to the title from Weld.

The music video for the title track (which aired on heavy rotation on MTV, MuchMusic and Night Tracks) featured clips from the anime film Space Adventure Cobra: The Movie, mainly featuring the character Jane Royal. The video for another one of the album's singles, "I've Been Waiting", used clips of the Urusei Yatsura character Lum.

"Evangeline"
29-second sample

The tracks "Evangeline" and "Your Sweet Voice" were both followed by the sound of a vinyl outgroove and a phonograph needle lifting off a record, which was meant to signify the end of each side of the album as though it were an LP (thus making the final three songs on the album to be, conceptually, considered bonus tracks). The song "Winona" was named after actress Winona Ryder, while "Evangeline" is sung from the point of view of Johnny Six from the comic book Evangeline.

== Release ==
Professional ratings
Review scores
Source	Rating
AllMusic	5/5 stars
Chicago Sun-Times	3.5/4 stars
Chicago Tribune	3/4 stars
Entertainment Weekly	A
NME	6/10
Q	4/5 stars
Rolling Stone	4/5 stars
Select	4/5
Spin Alternative Record Guide	9/10
The Village Voice	A−

Released in October 1991, Girlfriend is Sweet's most commercially and critically successful album to date, with The A.V. Club labeling it the best power pop album of the 1990s. The album peaked at No. 100 on the Billboard 200 album chart. The Village Voice, on their Pazz & Jop critics' poll, listed Girlfriend as the No. 7 best album of 1991. The title track hit No. 4 on the Billboard Modern Rock Tracks chart and No. 10 on the Billboard Mainstream Rock chart. "Divine Intervention" hit No. 23 on the Modern Rock chart. Slant Magazine included the album on their 2003 list of 50 Essential Pop Albums.

In 2006, the album was remastered and released under the "Legacy Edition" label, with three bonus tracks (originally released on the "Girlfriend" single, subtitled "the superdeformed CD", and also available on the Japanese version of the album), plus a second disc of home demos, live versions and session recordings called Goodfriend. Subtitled "Another Take on 'Girlfriend'", Goodfriend was a promotional CD partly distributed through Sweet's fan club, and was not commercially released until the Legacy Edition. "Goodfriend" was the original name of the title track, but after early listeners universally misheard the lyric, Sweet changed the title to "Girlfriend".

In 2014, the album received a vinyl release on the Plain Recordings label. (This was not the first release in LP format, however. Classic Records' "Rock the House" label issued it on vinyl, as did BMG in the US in the 1990s.) The single 12-inch vinyl disc featured the first 12 songs, with six songs on each side. The vinyl sound effects were not added like they were on the CD.

== Reissue ==
In 2018, independent vinyl reissue label Intervention Records announced that it would be releasing artist-approved 2 LP expanded editions of 100% Fun, Altered Beast, and Girlfriend; the three albums will also be released on CD/SACD. Intervention also announced a first time on vinyl reissue of Son of Altered Beast.

== Theatrical production ==
A theatrical production entitled Girlfriend, inspired by Sweet's album, debuted in 2010 at the Berkeley Repertory Theatre in Berkeley, California. The play was written by Todd Almond with songs from the album Girlfriend as well as subsequent Matthew Sweet albums.

== Track listing ==
=== Original release ===
All tracks are written by Matthew Sweet. Credit adapted from the original CD liner notes.

No.	Title	Lead guitar	Length
1.	"Divine Intervention"	Richard Lloyd	5:37
2.	"I've Been Waiting"	Lloyd	3:36
3.	"Girlfriend"	Robert Quine	3:40
4.	"Looking at the Sun"	Quine	4:16
5.	"Winona"	Quine	4:59
6.	"Evangeline"	Lloyd	4:45
7.	"Day for Night"	Quine	2:55
8.	"Thought I Knew You"	Matthew Sweet	2:57
9.	"You Don't Love Me"	Quine	5:21
10.	"I Wanted to Tell You"	Quine	4:30
11.	"Don't Go"	Quine	3:24
12.	"Your Sweet Voice"	Sweet	3:54
13.	"Does She Talk?"	Quine	3:27
14.	"Holy War"	Quine	3:25
15.	"Nothing Lasts"	Quine	3:33
Total length:			60:19

Legacy Edition bonus tracks
No.	Title	Length
16.	"Good Friend" (demo)	3:36
17.	"Superdeformed" (demo)	4:09
18.	"Teenage Female" (demo)	3:54
Total length:		71:58

=== Goodfriend ===
Goodfriend promotional album cover

All tracks are written by Matthew Sweet, except where noted.

No.	Title	Writer(s)	Length
1.	"Divine Intervention" (acoustic)		3:05
2.	"Girlfriend"		2:52
3.	"Day for Night" (live)		3:21
4.	"Thought I Knew You" (live)		3:57
5.	"Looking at the Sun" (acoustic)		4:15
6.	"Does She Talk?" (live)		4:23
7.	"You Don't Love Me" (live)		6:47
8.	"Someone to Pull the Trigger"		3:53
9.	"I've Been Waiting" (live)		3:45
10.	"Winona" (acoustic)		4:30
11.	"Girlfriend" (live)		4:05
12.	"Cortez the Killer" (live)	Neil Young	6:28
13.	"Isolation" (acoustic)	John Lennon	3:01
Total length:			54:22

== Personnel ==
- Matthew Sweet – all vocals (1–12, 14), acoustic piano (1), electric rhythm guitar (1–4, 6, 7, 10–14), bass (1–7, 9–14), acoustic rhythm guitar (2–5, 8–11), electric guitar intro (6), acoustic lead guitar (8), electric lead guitar (12), vocals (13, 15, acoustic guitar (15), vocals and guitars [bonus tracks] (16–18)
- Richard Lloyd – electric lead guitar (1, 2, 6), electric rhythm guitar (7), guitars [bonus track] (16)
- Robert Quine – electric lead guitar (3–5, 7, 9–11, 13–15), electric rhythm guitar (4)
- Lloyd Cole – electric rhythm guitar (4, 11, 12), acoustic rhythm guitar (8), electric tremolo guitar (11), guitars [bonus track] (16)
- Greg Leisz – lap steel guitar (3), pedal steel guitar (5, 9, 12)
- Andy McCulla – guitars [bonus track] (18)
- Ric Menck – drums (1, 2, 4, 11–13)
- Fred Maher – drums (3, 5–7, 9, 10, 14), acoustic rhythm guitar (13)

Musicians (Disc 2)

- Matthew Sweet – vocals, acoustic piano, guitars, bass
- Ivan Julian – guitars
- Amy Ray – guitars (12), vocals (12)
- Emily Saliers – guitars (12)
- Brad Jones – bass (3, 4, 6, 7, 11, 12), vocals (3, 4, 6, 7, 11, 12)
- Paul Chastain – bass (9), vocals (9)
- Pete Thomas – drums (2, 8)
- Ron Pangborn – drums (3, 4, 6, 7, 11, 12)
- Ric Menck – drums (9)
- Scarlet Rivera – violin (4, 12)
- Jane Scarpantoni – cello (7, 12)

=== Production ===
- Fred Maher – producer
- Matthew Sweet – producer
- Jim Rondinelli – recording, mixing
- John Parthum – recording assistant, mix assistant
- Dana Vicek – recording assistant, mix assistant
- Scott Hull – editing, assembling
- Bob Ludwig – mastering
- Masterdisk (New York, NY) – editing and mastering location
- Emily Morrison – project assistant
- Lee Hammond – art direction
- Dorrie Cheng – design
- Michael Lavine – photography
- Ken Galante – cover photography
- Russell Carter Artist Management, Ltd. – management

Legacy Edition

- Darren Salmeri – reissue producer
- Steve Berkowitz – A&R
- Jeremy Holiday – A&R coordinator
- Joseph M. Palamaccio – mastering
- Lisa Buckner – project director
- Rob Carter – art direction, design
- Michael Lavine – photography
- Bud Scoppa – liner notes

Original "Goodfriend" credits (Disc 2)

- Fred Maher – producer
- Matthew Sweet – producer
- Simon Askew – producer (2, 8)
- Scott Byron – A&R
- Bud Scoppa – A&R
- Adam Askew – engineer (2–8)
- Biff Dawes – engineer (3, 4, 6, 7, 11, 12)
- John Walsh – engineer (9)
- Jim Duncan – mixing (3, 4, 6, 7, 11, 12)
- Jeff Park – mixing (3, 4, 6, 7, 11, 12)
- Jim Rondinelli – mixing (9)
- Emily Morrison – project assistant
- Barry Levine – design concept

== Charts ==
Chart performance for Girlfriend
Chart (1992)	Peak position
Australian Albums (ARIA)	82
US Billboard 200	100
