= Blue Sky on Mars =

Studio album by Matthew Sweet
- Released: March 25, 1997
- Recorded: October 1996
- Studios: Southern Tracks (Atlanta, Georgia); Sunset Sound (Hollywood, California)
- Genre: Alternative rock
- Length: 36:29
- Label: Zoo Entertainment
- Producers: Brendan O'Brien, Matthew Sweet

Matthew Sweet chronology
100% Fun (1995)	Blue Sky on Mars (1997)	In Reverse (1999)

Singles from Blue Sky on Mars
- 1. "Where You Get Love" Released: 1997

Professional ratings
Review scores
Source	Rating
Allmusic	2.5/5 stars
Chicago Tribune	2/4 stars
Christgau's Consumer Guide	(neither)
Entertainment Weekly	B
Los Angeles Times	2.5/4 stars
Rolling Stone	2/5 stars
The Rolling Stone Album Guide	2.5/5 stars

Blue Sky on Mars is the sixth album by alternative rock musician Matthew Sweet. It was released on Zoo Entertainment in 1997.

== Cover ==
The cover of the album features an image by Viking 1, the first spacecraft to land on Mars; the album's liner notes include additional imagery of the planet's landscape as taken by the spacecraft on July 20, 1976. The text on the cover was done by fantastic artist Roger Dean, best known for his work on album covers for bands such as Yes. The album's title comes from the tour in the film Total Recall.

== Release ==
It was the second last release by Zoo Entertainment (with the final being Lusk's Free Mars), as the label was absorbed into Volcano Entertainment in 1997. The album was met with little commercial success, but favorable reviews. Critic Jim Farber of Entertainment Weekly gave the album a "B", writing that it "matched his usual sugary melodies to denser production, hinting at everything from the Beach Boys to '80s new wave", and adding that "[Sweet's] power pop still has the knack". The A.V. Club wrote that the album contained "nice, sugary three-minute pop singles that instantly lodge themselves in your cranium", adding that it is "a slight but worthy addition to his terrific catalog".

== Details ==
The song "Hollow" was featured in the film The Game, and "Come to California" was featured in the film Nancy Drew.

== Track listing ==
All songs written by Matthew Sweet except "Back To You" written by Ric Menck and Matthew Sweet.

1. "Come to California" - 3:31
2. "Back to You" - 3:10
3. "Where You Get Love" - 3:35
4. "Hollow" - 4:03
5. "Behind the Smile" - 2:23
6. "Until You Break" - 4:50
7. "Over It" - 1:37
8. "Heaven and Earth" - 2:32
9. "All Over My Head" - 3:04
10. "Into Your Drug" - 2:39
11. "Make Believe" - 1:50
12. "Missing Time" - 3:15

Japanese bonus tracks

13. "If It's Happening You'll Know" - 3:10
14. "Close Inside" - 4:32
15. "Final Hour" - 3:37

== Personnel ==
- Matthew Sweet – vocals, guitars, bass (1–11, 13–15), theremin (2, 12), synthesizers (4, 6–8), acoustic piano (6), keyboards (12, 15)
- Brendan O'Brien – acoustic piano (1, 7), keyboards (2, 11, 14, 15), synthesizers (3, 4), E-bow guitar (4), Mellotron (5, 10), guitars (5, 8, 13), electric harpsichord (6), drums (6), organ (13)
- Tony Marsico – bass (12)
- Ric Menck – drums (1, 4, 7, 9, 15)
- Stuart Johnson – drums (2, 3, 5, 8, 10–14)

=== Production ===
- Brendan O'Brien – producer, mixing
- Matthew Sweet – producer, arrangements
- Nick DiDia – engineer (1–11, 13–15)
- Caram Costanzo – second engineer (1–11, 13–15)
- David Schiffman – recording (12)
- Larry Malchose – recording assistant (12)
- Bob Ludwig – mastering at Gateway Mastering (Portland, Maine)
- Stephanie Hughes – project coordinator
- Martyn Dean – design
- Roger Dean – lettering
- Jeff Bender – photography
- NASA/JPL – Mars photography
- Russell Carter and Cathy Lyons – management

== Charts ==
Chart performance for Blue Sky on Mars
Chart (1997)	Peak position
US Billboard 200	66
