= Marcia Resnick =

American photographer (1950–2025)

- Born: November 21, 1950; Brooklyn, New York City, U.S.
- Died: June 18, 2025 (aged 74); New York City, U.S.
- Education: Cooper Union, New York University, California Institute of the Arts
- Known for: Photography
- Website: marciaresnick.com

Marcia Aylene Resnick (November 21, 1950 – June 18, 2025) was an American photographer, author, and graphic artist. She was born and lived in New York City.

== Publications and exhibitions ==
Resnick's book of photographs and text, Punks, Poets, and Provocateurs:New York City Bad Boys, 1977-1982, published November 10, 2015, has an Afterword written by Anthony Haden-Guest, and a contribution by Victor Bockris. An earlier book, published in 1978 by Resnick Re-visions, once out of print was reissued in 2019 by the Swiss publisher Edition Patrick Frey.

In 2016, the exhibition Marcia Resnick, Conception: Vintage Photographs 1974-1976 was shown at Deborah Bell Photographs gallery and reviewed by L'oeil de la photographie (the Eye of Photography magazine). Then in 2023 the Deborah Bell Gallery mounted another exhbiton of Resnick's work Marcia Resnick: Ahead of Her Time. The latter exhibiton was the fifth of Renick's work at the gallery

In 2024-2025, her works were included in the National Gallery of Art's exhibition, The '70s Lens: Reimagining Documentary Photography and related online feature 12 Documentary Photographers Who Changed the Way We See the World.

== Photographic subjects ==
Her photographs of musicians of the rock milieu appear on their album covers. Among the subjects of her photographs are John Belushi, David Byrne, Iggy Pop, John Lydon, Mick Jagger, Andy Warhol, Johnny Thunders, William Burroughs, and Allen Ginsberg.

== Education, teaching, and journalism ==
Resnick studied at Cooper Union and New York University before going to graduate school at The California Institute of the Arts, where she studied with John Baldessari and Allen Kaprow. Back in New York, she taught at Queens College and NYU and worked for SoHo Weekly News and New York Magazine.

== Personal life and death ==
Resnick married MC5 guitarist Wayne Kramer in 1982, but they divorced a year later.

Resnick died from lung cancer at a hospice in Manhattan, New York City, on June 18, 2025, at the age of 74.
