= Dave Hill (comedian) =

American comedian (born 1970)

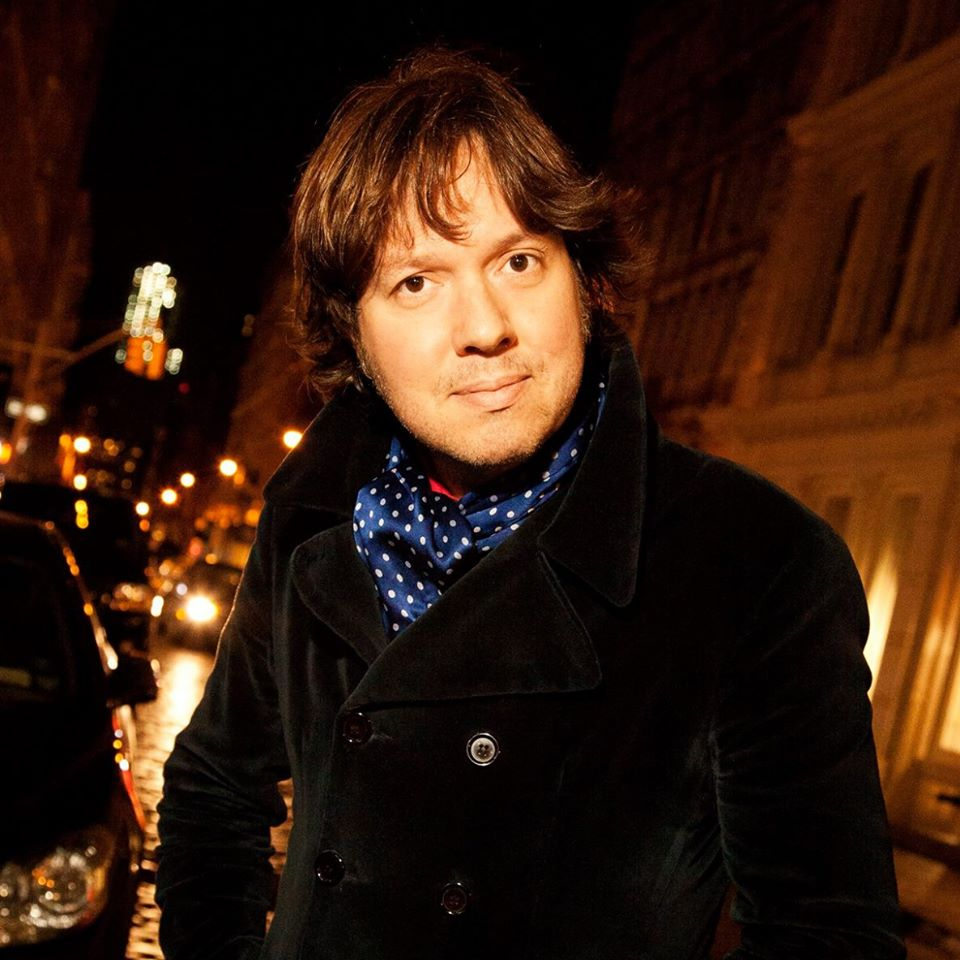
- Hill in 2016
- Born: 1970 (age 55–56); Cleveland, Ohio, U.S.
- Occupations: Comedian, radio host, writer, musician, actor
- Website: davehillonline.com

Dave Hill (born 1970) is an American comedian, radio host, writer, musician and actor originally from Cleveland, Ohio. He is the host of The Dave Hill Goodtime Hour, a weekly livestream and podcast part of the Maximum Fun network. In 2007 Variety named Hill one of their "10 Comics to Watch".

== Career ==
=== Comedy ===
In May 2019, Hill was permanently banned from Twitter after he repeatedly responded to attacks from Trump supporters with jokes about having consensual sexual intercourse with their mothers and, in some cases, their fathers.

In August 2024, Phish featured Hill as part of a stand up comedy special at their Mondegreen music festival camping weekend in Dover, Delaware. Performing at the Leigh Fordham Hall, named for the longtime Phish crew member, with Rory Scovel and Gianmarco Soresi also featured.

=== Music ===
Hill wrote the theme song for Last Week Tonight with John Oliver, "Go", performed by his band Valley Lodge.

In 2016, Hill formed a psychedelic rock band with Chris Reifert called Painted Doll. The band's self-titled debut album was released on Tee Pee Records on February 16, 2018.

Hill was a member of the 1990s alternative band Sons of Elvis, which he formed with friends while a student at Fordham University. The band signed with Priority Records shortly after graduation and released a debut full-length album Glodean in 1995 as well as a limited edition disc titled Mrs. White, featuring live recordings and several tracks from Glodean. The lead single from Glodean, "Formaldehyde", received airplay at radio and on MTV, and was also featured on the soundtrack of the feature film Higher Learning, by director John Singleton. The band also performed two songs live on The Jon Stewart Show in 1995.

Hill also played bass for Cleveland-based rock band Cobra Verde, bass for Lucy Wainwright Roche and former Faith No More singer Chuck Mosley. He has also played guitar with Walter Schreifels' solo band and with Diamondsnake, a hard rock band also featuring Moby, Tomato, and Phil Costello. Hill is the creator and sole member of the semi-fictional Norwegian black metal band Witch Taint and currently fronts the power pop band Valley Lodge, both with Phil Costello.

Hill provided a guitar solo for the song, "Cave My Head Full of Dreams,” from the Brooklyn band Late Cambrian, which was released in February 2024.

=== Podcast and radio ===
In March 2019, Hill launched a second podcast, Dave Hill: History Fluffer, with TV producer Jim Biederman, comedian Jodi Lennon, and producer Chris Gersbeck. The show places Hill throughout different time periods while Biederman and Lennon question his claims.
