= 2 Skinnee J's =

American hip hop band

- 2 Skinnee J's, 1998

Background information
- Origin: Brooklyn, New York, US
- Genres: Nerdcore; rap rock; alternative rock
- Years active: 1991–2003, 2008–present
- Labels: Capricorn; Volcano; Dolphins vs. Unicorns
- Members: Special J (Joel E. Johnson); J Guevara (Noah David Julian Green); Andy Action (Andrew E. Markham); Eddie Eyeball (Edward M. Cisneros); Lance Rockworthy (Lance M. Fanguy); Stevie Spice (Stephen Sumners Light); A.J. "Stumpy" Johnson (Adam Johnson)
- Past members: Rabbi J-Slim (Jason Milligan); Joey Viturbo (Joseph A. Schwartz); J. Jonah Jameson (Alan Diggs); A. Mays (John M. Moraski); Mikey B (Mike Boyko); King Vitamin (Sammy Buonaugurio); DJ Casper (Mitch Wells); Capital R (Rob Wofford); D. Summerz (Daniel Summers)
- Website: 2sj.com

2 Skinnee J's (alternatively spelled Two Skinnee J's or Too Skinnee J's) is an American hip hop band from Brooklyn, New York, whose music has been categorized as nerdcore and rap rock. The band was founded in 1991 by Special J (vocals), Rabbi J-Slim (vocals), Joey Viturbo (guitar), Sammy B (bass guitar), DJ Casper (keyboards), and Andy Action (drums). With numerous line-up changes, the band was active through the 1990s until 2003, when they officially disbanded. The group recorded several demos, 2 EPs, and 3 studio albums; SuperMercado! on Capricorn Records, Volumizer on Volcano Records, and Sexy Karate on Dolphins vs. Unicorns. The band went through several key membership changes before its breaking up in 2003. However, they briefly reunited for reunion tours in 2005, 2008, 2010 and 2012.

== History ==
2 Skinnee J's formed in 1991 at Columbia University in New York City. The original line-up was Special J and Rabbi J-Slim (vocals), Joey Viturbo (guitar), Sammy B (bass), DJ Casper (keyboards), and Andy Action (drums). Their first independent release was on cassette, titled 6 Songs for 5 Bucks. They attracted a fan following through heavy touring in their early years. A second cassette release entitled American Heroes, was released in 1994 with the band titled "Too Skinnee J's". Several personnel changes saw original rapper J-Slim bass player Sammy B and guitarist Joey Viturbo part with the band; whilst J Guevara (formerly of Canadian ska band Me Mom and Morgentaler) and Stevie Spice (of Connecticut ska band Spicy Gribblets) were recruited. Former bassist Sammy B rejoined the band in 1995 as a guitarist and using the name King Vitamin.

They started to break into the mainstream in 1998 after signing with Capricorn and releasing SuperMercado!, which found airplay on modern-rock radio stations. 2 Skinnee J's performed at Woodstock '99 and later criticized the event. Relations soured with Capricorn and the label delayed release of the second album on 2 Skinnee J's two-album contract, Volumizer, produced by Mickey Petralia, for two years after it was recorded. The label folded and the band's contract was bought by Volcano Records. When the album was officially released in 2002, many critics refused to review it again as they had reviewed a pre-release version years earlier. Rockworthy says the delay and its fallout, which left the band without a label, were a major problem and contributed to their decision to break up in 2003. Sexy Karate was released on indie label Dolphins vs Unicorn that year, before their farewell tour in 2003. They returned for a "Five Nights of Fury" tour in 2005 and another five-show reunion tour in 2008.

In 2009, the band website announced the September premier of Get In The Van, a film shot during the 2008 reunion tour.

Special J, Eddie Eyeball, Lance Rockworthy and Andy Action got together for the band's next reunion tour. Billed as "acoustically-charged, tell-all brawls," the tour had seven dates between February 12 and April 16, 2010. These shows were held at small, intimate venues, and featured heavy audience participation, through Q&A sessions and singalongs. In between acoustic versions of selections from their entire catalog of songs, each band member told stories about how songs were written, life on the road and the evolution of the band. J Guevara was scheduled to join the band for two of the April shows, and several hints were dropped about plans for a "full-on electric" tour to follow in summer 2010.

== Members ==
Timeline

== Discography ==
=== Albums ===
- SuperMercado! (1998)
- Volumizer (2002)
- Sexy Karate (2003)

=== EPs ===
- 6 Songs for 5 Bucks (1993)
- American Heroes (1994)
- Return of the New & Improved (1995)
- Sing, Earthboy, Sing! (1997)

=== Live and compilations ===
- Live at Lakewood Amphitheatre 09/18/1999
- Live At the Blue Note 11/14/2000
- 718: Live Farewell Extravaganza
- Enter the Gold Hat: Sexy Karate Live!
- The Good, The Bad & The Serious!
- The Big Green Book
