= Son of Altered Beast =

EP by Matthew Sweet
- Released: March 14, 1994
- Recorded: October 9, 1993–January 17, 1994
- Genre: Alternative rock
- Length: 28:36
- Label: Zoo Entertainment

Matthew Sweet chronology
Altered Beast (1993)	Son of Altered Beast (1994)	100% Fun (1995)

Professional ratings
Review scores
Source	Rating
AllMusic	3/5 stars
Christgau's Consumer Guide	A−
Entertainment Weekly	B+

Son of Altered Beast is an EP by alternative rock musician Matthew Sweet. Released following Altered Beast in 1994 by Zoo Entertainment, it contains live and alternate versions of various Sweet songs.

In 2018, independent vinyl reissue label Intervention Records announced a first time on vinyl reissue of Son of Altered Beast. This release was later canceled in 2019. On April 10, 2021, Intervention Records announced that it will be releasing both Hybrid SACD and vinyl remasters. Both will be cut from the original master tape and artist approved.

== Track listing ==
All songs written by Matthew Sweet, except where noted.

1. "Devil with the Green Eyes" (remix) - 4:41
2. "Superdeformed" (live) - 3:39
3. "Someone to Pull the Trigger" (live) - 4:20
4. "Knowing People" (live) - 4:36
5. "I Wanted to Tell You" (live) - 4:33
6. "Don't Cry No Tears" (live) (Neil Young) - 2:51
7. "Ultrasuede" (studio outtake) - 3:56
