= Cruel Smile =

Compilation album by Elvis Costello and the Imposters
- Released: 1 October 2002
- Genre: Rock
- Length: 70:54
- Label: Island
- Producers: Elvis Costello, Cíaran Cahil, Leo Pearson, Kieran Lynch, Kevin Killen

Elvis Costello chronology
When I Was Cruel (2002)	Cruel Smile (2002)	North (2003)

Elvis Costello and the Imposters chronology
When I Was Cruel (2002)	Cruel Smile (2002)	The Delivery Man (2004)

Professional ratings
Review scores
Source	Rating
Allmusic	1/5 stars
Pitchfork Media	(7.5/10)

Cruel Smile is a compilation album by Elvis Costello released in 2002. Though it is credited as "Elvis Costello and the Imposters", the Imposters only appear on five tracks. It consists of B-sides and leftover material from the When I Was Cruel sessions. Cruel Smile received two Grammy award nominations at the 2003 Grammys in the categories Best Rock Album and Best Alternative Music Album.

== Track listing ==
All tracks are written by Elvis Costello, unless otherwise indicated.

No.	Title	Writer(s)	Length
1.	"Smile" (New York studio version, Japan-only single)	Charlie Chaplin; Geoff Parsons; John Turner	3:05
2.	"When I Was Cruel (No. 1)" (B-side to "Tear Off Your Own Head (It's A Doll Revolution)")		4:16
3.	"Almost Blue" (Live in Sydney, recorded 13 July 2002)		5:04
4.	"15 Petals" (Live in Sydney, recorded 13 July 2002)		5:35
5.	"Spooky Girlfriend" (Live at KFOG, recorded 22 May 2002)		4:42
6.	"Honeyhouse" (Cruel No. 2)		5:07
7.	"Revolution Doll" (From the CD single of "Tear Off Your Own Head (It's A Doll Revolution)")		3:44
8.	"Peroxide Side (Blunt Cut)" (B-side to "45")		3:48
9.	"Oh Well" (From UK & Japan editions of When I Was Cruel)	Costello; K "Q-Tip" Fareed	2:52
10.	"The Imposter vs. the Floodtide (Dust & Petals)" (From the CD single of "Tear Off Your Own Head (It's A Doll Revolution)")		3:58
11.	"Watching the Detectives" / "My Funny Valentine" (live in Tokyo, recorded 5 July 2002)	Costello /: Richard Rogers; Lorenz Hart	7:09
12.	"Dust" (Live in Melbourne, recorded 17 July 2002)		6:39
13.	"Uncomplicated" (Live in Tokyo, recorded 28 June 2002)		4:46
14.	"Smile" (Paris studio version, B-side to "Smile")	Chaplin; Parsons; Turner	3:32
15.	"Soul for Hire" (Hidden track, live in Tokyo, recorded 28 June 2002)		6:36
Total length:			70:54

== Personnel ==
- Elvis Costello - vocals, orchestration
- Steve Averill – design
- Elena Barere – concertmaster
- Joey Baron – drums
- Ciáran Cahil – producer, mixing
- Greg Cohen – bass
- Anthony Coleman – piano
- Jill Dell'Abate – music coordinator
- Enrico DiCecco – violin
- Jesse Dylan – photography
- Phil Edwards – engineer
- Davey Faragher – bass guitar
- Barry Finclair – violin
- Kevin Killen – producer
- Jeanne LeBlanc – cello
- Vince Lionti – viola
- Richard Locker – cello
- Kieran Lynch – producer, mixing
- Roy Nathanson – alto saxophone
- Steve Nieve – piano, keyboards, string ensemble
- Leo Pearson – producer, mixing
- Renaud Pion – clarinet, soprano saxophone, Cor Anglais
- Marc Ribot – guitar
- Jeff Schmidt – mixing
- Vincent Ségal – cello
- Richard Sortomme – violin
- Pete Thomas – drums

== Charts ==
Chart (2002)	Peak position
US Billboard 200	180
