= Shagwell =

Shagwell may refer to:

- Felicity Shagwell, fictional character, Austin Powers: The Spy Who Shagged Me
- Gillian Shagwell, fictional character, Austin Powers
- Shagwell, a member of the Brave Companions, a fictional organisation in A Song of Ice and Fire
