= Robin Lane =

American rock singer and songwriter (born 1947)

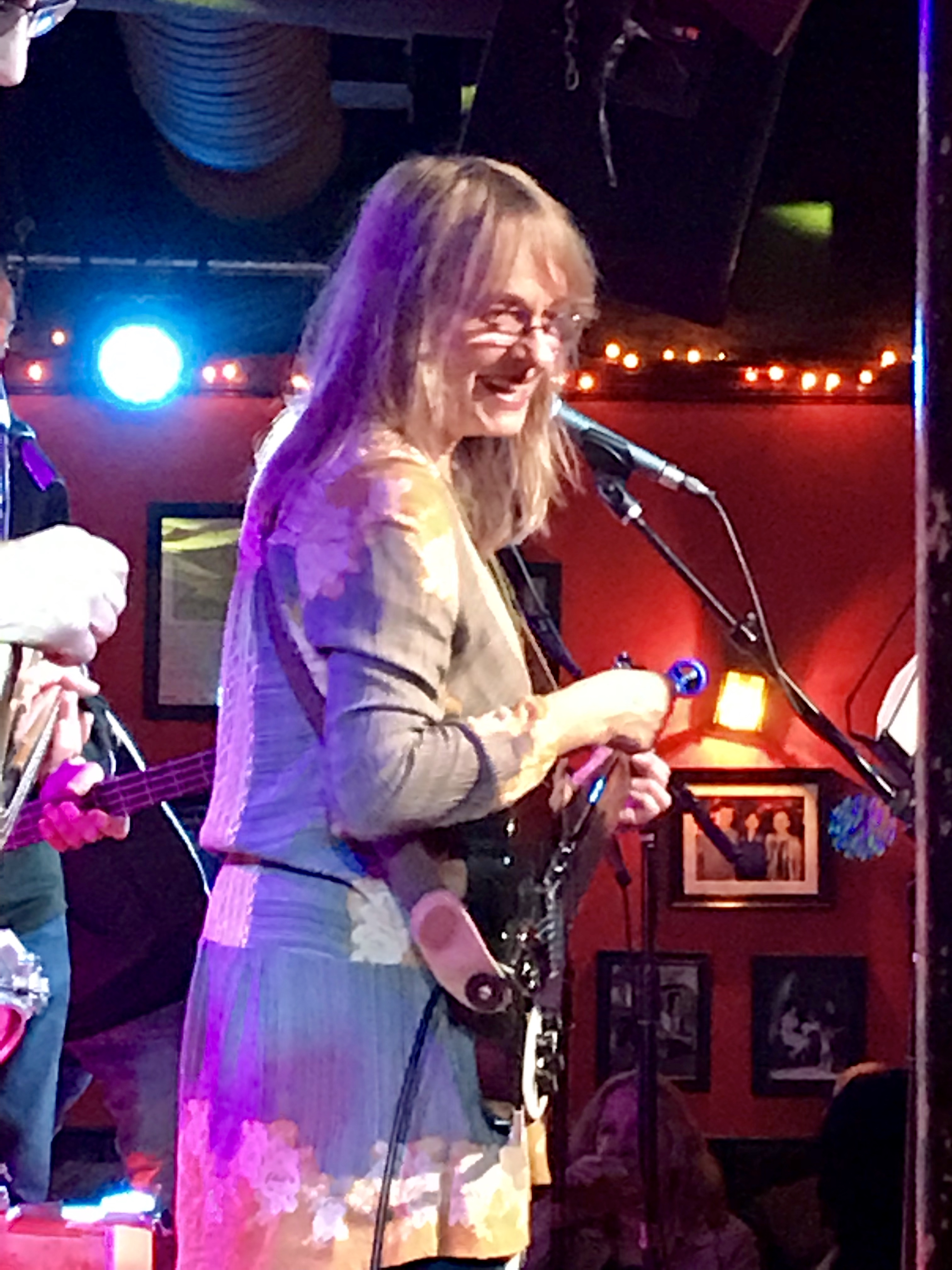
Robin Lane performing in Somerville, Massachusetts, in 2019

Robin Lane (born 1947) is an American rock singer and songwriter. Her band, Robin Lane & the Chartbusters, released three albums on Warner Bros. Records in the early 1980s, and was best known for its single "When Things Go Wrong".

== Early life ==
Born Los Angeles, California, Robin Lane grew up in Los Angeles. Her father was Ken Lane, songwriter and pianist for Dean Martin; her mother was a model. While in her teens, Robin began singing and performing in folk-rock clubs in southern California. From 1968 to 1970 she was married to future Police lead guitarist Andy Summers. In 1969, she sang backing vocals on the song "Round & Round" on Neil Young's album Everybody Knows This Is Nowhere. In the 1970s, Lane moved to eastern Pennsylvania and then to Cambridge, Massachusetts, where her musical interests turned from folk-rock to a harder sound influenced by the growing punk rock and new wave genres.

== The Chartbusters ==
In 1978, Lane formed the Chartbusters with Asa Brebner and Leroy Radcliffe (of The Modern Lovers), Scott Baerenwald and Tim Jackson. She had signed with Private Stock Records, which shortly afterward went out of business. After Jerry Wexler saw a Chartbusters show, however, he signed the band to Warner Brothers. Their first album, Robin Lane & the Chartbusters (1980) featured the singles "When Things Go Wrong" and "Why Do You Tell Lies?", earned favorable reviews, and received widespread airplay. "When Things Go Wrong" (which made, if not exactly busted, the Billboard singles chart at #87) was the eleventh video shown on MTV's first broadcast day on August 1, 1981. The band had two more releases on Warner, the EP 5 Live (1980) and Imitation Life (1981). The limited commercial success of these records, combined with business disputes and Lane's desire to have a child, led to the breakup of the Chartbusters in 1983.

== Later years ==
Lane continued writing and recording music, and released the independent EP Heart Connection (1984), the self-produced cassette In Concert (1989), and the full-length Catbird Seat (1995). She co-wrote the song "Wishing On Telstar" for the 1991 Susanna Hoffs album When You're a Boy.

In 2001, Lane and several of the Chartbusters regrouped for two reunion concerts, and decided to continue recording and performing; they released Piece of Mind in 2003. Since then, Lane has moved to western Massachusetts, where she works with the Turners Falls, Massachusetts Women's Resource Center, using music therapy to aid survivors of abuse.

On 4 April 2014 Tim Jackson premiered his film of Robin Lane's life and career, When Things Go Wrong, followed by a Q & A and a set by Robin Lane & the Chartbusters, at the Regent Theatre in Arlington, Massachusetts.

On March 2 and 3, 2019, band members staged another reunion concert at The Burren in Somerville, Massachusetts to support the release of Many Years Ago: The Complete Robin Lane & the Chartbusters Collection (Blixa Sounds). That weekend's edition of the Chartbusters consisted of most of the original lineup: Lane on vocals and guitar, Asa Brebner on guitar, Scott Baerenwald on bass, drummer Tim Jackson, and guitarist Billy Loosigian (taking the place of original guitarist Leroy Radcliffe).

Many Years Ago is a three-disc set. Previously released material consists of the two studio LPs, Robin Lane & the Chartbusters (1980) and Imitation Life (1981); and the EPs 5 Live (1980) and Heart Connection (1984). In addition, the set contains outtakes from the recording sessions for Heart Connection, as well as a series of demos, previously unreleased studio tracks, and various live performances.

Since then, Lane has released the double Instant Album (2020), which consists of solo material from her entire 40-year career, and the country-tinged Dirt Road to Heaven, released on Red on Red Records, to much acclaim in June 2022.

== Discography ==
=== With the Chartbusters ===
- Robin Lane & The Chartbusters (Warner Bros., 1980; #207)
- 5 Live EP (Warner Bros., 1980)
- Imitation Life (Warner Bros., 1981; #172)
- Piece of Mind (Windjam Records, 2003)
- Many Years Ago: The Complete Robin Lane & the Chartbusters Collection (Blixa Sounds, 2019)

=== Robin Lane ===
- Heart Connection EP (Independent release, 1984)
- In Concert (Independent release, 1989)
- Catbird Seat (1995)
- Out of the Ashes (2011)
- The Sweet Candy Collection (2011)
- A Woman's Voice (2013)
- Instant Album (2020)
- Dirt Road to Heaven (2022)
