= 45 (Elvis Costello song) =

Single by Elvis Costello

from the album When I Was Cruel
- B-side: "My Mood Swings"
- Released: 2002
- Genre: Rock
- Length: 3:33
- Label: Island, Mercury
- Songwriter(s): Elvis Costello
- Producer(s): Elvis Costello, Leo Pearson, Kieran Lynch

Elvis Costello singles chronology
"Tear Off Your Own Head (It's a Doll Revolution)" (2002)	"45" (2002)	"Monkey to Man" (2004)

"45" is a song written by Elvis Costello from his 2002 album When I Was Cruel. The second single released from the album reached number 92 in the UK charts. To date, it is his last single to chart in the United Kingdom.

Joining Costello on the recording were drummer Pete Thomas, bassist Davey Faragher and keyboardist Steve Nieve. They would later be collectively known as The Imposters.

== Background ==
The song was written on the day of Costello's 45th birthday in August 1999. He said, "I don't think there were any rough drafts at all. It all just appeared one afternoon. Sometimes that happens, and then other times you might wait years to come up with a song." On September 29, 1999, Costello and Nieve played a stripped-back version of the then-unrecorded song on The Tonight Show with Jay Leno.

The story within the song commences in 1945, and then progresses in nine-year increments, through Costello's birth, up until his 45th birthday. Costello said, "it was really just about the measuring of your life in musical signposts and landmarks. Which we all do, I believe."

Throughout the song, "45" refers to the end of World War II, the playing speed of a 7-inch single, the caliber of a revolver, as well as Costello's age.

The B-side, "My Mood Swings", was co-written with then-wife Cait O'Riordan for the movie The Big Lebowski. The recording, featuring Marc Ribot, Jim Keltner, and Greg Cohen, appeared only momentarily in the movie on The Dude's Walkman.

== Reception ==
Pulse! described "45" as a "key song" that was "remarkably concise — a metaphysical conceit that showcases Costello's formidable lyrical discipline. It is one of the most unguardedly autobiographical Elvis Costello songs ever written."

Len Righi of Allentown Morning Call said, "Costello spins together, with casual brilliance, a tale of war, marriage, birth and betrayal." The A.V. Club claimed that the song sounded "as catchy and clever as one of the singles it celebrates."
