= Daniel Dalton =

Daniel Dalton may refer to:

- Daniel Dalton (British politician) (born 1974), English cricketer and British Member of the European Parliament
- Daniel Dalton (American politician) (born 1949), New Jersey politician
- Dan Dalton, music producer, Peppermint Trolley Company
