= The Faragher Brothers =

- Origin: Redlands, California, United States
- Genres: Soft rock; blue-eyed soul
- Years active: 1975 - 1980
- Labels: ABC Records; Polydor Records
- Past members: Davey Faragher; Jimmy Faragher; Danny Faragher; Tommy Faragher; Marty Faragher; Pammy Faragher

The Faragher Brothers is a blue-eyed soul family band from Redlands, California. It initially consisted of brothers Tommy Faragher, Davey Faragher, Jimmy Faragher and Danny Faragher. Siblings Marty Faragher and Pammy Faragher joined the group in 1979.

== History ==
Danny and Jimmy Faragher entered the music industry in 1964 by forming sunshine pop band Peppermint Trolley Company with Greg Tornquist and Casey Cunningham. Later, the band added Patrick McClure, changed their name to Bones and shifted to a folk rock direction.

After Bones disbanded in 1973, Danny and Jimmy formed The Faragher Brothers with brothers Tommy and Davey. They recorded four albums throughout their existence and were the first all-white band to have an appearance on Soul Train. They contributed backing vocals on numerous songs to artists such as Kiss, Melissa Manchester, Peter Criss, Ringo Starr, Randy Edelman and Lynda Carter. They broke up in 1980 and pursued their own interests.

== Discography ==
=== Albums ===
- 1976: The Faragher Brothers
- 1977: Family Ties
- 1979: Open Your Eyes
- 1979: The Faraghers

=== Charted Singles ===
Year	Title	Chart positions	
Year	Title	US	US AC
1976	"Never Get Your Love Behind Me"	-	46
1979	"Stay the Night"	50	-

== Members ==
- Davey Faragher - Bass, Vocals
- Jimmy Faragher - Guitar, Vocals
- Danny Faragher - Vocals, Harmonica B3 Organ
- Tommy Faragher - Electric Piano, Synth, Vocals
- Marty Faragher - Drums, Percussion, Vocals
- Pammy Faragher - Vocals
