= When You're a Boy =

Studio album by Susanna Hoffs
- Released: January 29, 1991
- Recorded: 1990
- Studios: A&M Studios, Capitol Studios and Sunset Sound (Hollywood, California): Larrabee Sound Studios (West Hollywood, California); The Grey Room (North Hollywood, California)
- Genres: Rock; new wave
- Length: 45:07
- Label: Columbia
- Producer: David Kahne

Susanna Hoffs chronology
When You're a Boy (1991)	Susanna Hoffs (1996)

When You're a Boy is the debut solo studio album by American singer Susanna Hoffs. It begins with the Billboard top 40 single "My Side of the Bed", includes the track "Unconditional Love" (co-written by Cyndi Lauper), and ends with a cover of "Boys Keep Swinging", the 1979 song written by David Bowie and Brian Eno. The album's title comes from the lyrics to the latter.

The album peaked at No. 83 on the U.S. Billboard 200 chart.

Three singles were released from the album: "My Side of the Bed", "Unconditional Love", and "Only Love". The first two featured the non-album B-side "Circus Girl".

== Critical reception ==
Professional ratings
Review scores
Source	Rating
AllMusic	1.5/5 stars
Chicago Tribune	2.5/4 stars
Entertainment Weekly	B+
Los Angeles Times	2.5/5 stars
NME	3/10
Q	4/5 stars
Record Mirror	4/10
Rolling Stone	2/5 stars
Sounds	3.5/5 stars
Spin Alternative Record Guide	8/10

Jimmy Nicol of Q gave the album four out of five stars and wrote, "An album which expands the Bangles' brief into undreamed of territories. She reveals herself to be a highly inventive composer, lyricist – and even humourist ... After all, how many other American pop stars embarking on a solo career would name their album after a late '70s English art-rock 45?"

In their review, Billboard noted that the "ex-Bangle's solo debut is laden with potential hit singles. Hoffs' breathy, childlike delivery is perfect for her cover of 'Unconditional Love' (which could be this record's 'Eternal Flame'); the wistful 'No Kind of Love,' Monkees-like pop ditty 'This Time,' and first single 'My Side of the Bed.' Just the right pop record to ward off the winter chill and bring on the warm breezes of spring."

AllMusic's review was negative, giving it one and a half out of five stars, and remarking, "Although the album was released in 1991, it sounds like bad mid-'80s music. Hoffs and the Bangles had a few catchy pop ditties; however, there are none to be found here."

== Track listing ==
Track listing for When You're a Boy
#	Title	Writer(s)	Length
1.	"My Side of the Bed"	Hoffs, Tom Kelly, Billy Steinberg	3:29
2.	"No Kind of Love"	Hoffs, David Kahne, Scott Cutler, Ross Rice	3:05
3.	"Wishing on Telstar"	Robin Lane, Jimmy Cipolla	4:11
4.	"That's Why Girls Cry"	Kahne, Juliana Hatfield, Hoffs	3:59
5.	"Unconditional Love"	Cyndi Lauper, Tom Kelly, Billy Steinberg	3:51
6.	"Something New"	John Hanes, Cary Sheldon, Hoffs, Kahne	3:52
7.	"So Much for Love"	J. Hanes, Pearl E. Gates, Peter Dunne, Hilary Hanes	3:33
8.	"This Time"	Steve Summers	2:36
9.	"Only Love"	Hoffs, Diane Warren	4:25
10.	"It's Lonely Out Here"	Hoffs, Kelly, Steinberg	3:52
11.	"Made of Stone"	Jennfer Condos, Hoffs, Kahne	3:13
12.	"Boys Keep Swinging"	David Bowie, Brian Eno	4:59

== Personnel ==
- Susanna Hoffs – vocals, backing vocals, additional guitars
- David Kahne – keyboards, programming
- Rusty Anderson – guitars
- Randy Jackson – bass
- John Entwistle – additional bass (12)
- Zachary Alford – drums
- Gary Ferguson – drums
- Carlos Vega – drums
- Lisa Brenneis – backing vocals
- Juliana Hatfield – backing vocals
- Tom Kelly – backing vocals
- Robin Lane – backing vocals
- Donovan Leitch – backing vocals
- Eric Lowen – backing vocals
- Dan Navarro – backing vocals
- Michelle Rohl – backing vocals
- Maria Vidal – backing vocals

=== Production ===
- David Kahne – producer, arrangements, engineer, mixing (5, 6)
- Steve Churchyard – engineer
- Clark Germain – engineer
- David Leonard – engineer, mixing (1–3, 5, 7–12)
- Joel Stoner – engineer, mixing (5)
- Keith Cohen – mixing (4)
- Ray Blair – assistant engineer
- Greg Goldman – assistant engineer
- Ed Goodreau – assistant engineer
- Mike Kloster – assistant engineer
- Sylvia Massy – assistant engineer
- Charlie Paakkari – assistant engineer
- Mike Piersante – assistant engineer
- Lori Fumar – assistant mix engineer
- Wally Traugott – mastering at Capitol Studios
- Randee St. Nicholas – photography

== Charts ==
Chart performance for When You're a Boy
Chart (1991)	Peak position
Australian Albums (ARIA)	67
Canada Top Albums/CDs (RPM)	43
Finnish Albums (The Official Finnish Charts)	8
Dutch Albums (Album Top 100)	51
Swedish Albums (Sverigetopplistan)	29
UK Albums (Official Charts)	56
US Billboard 200	83
US Cash Box Top 200 Albums	74
