= The Deep End (Susanna Hoffs album) =

Studio album by Susanna Hoffs
- Released: April 7, 2023
- Length: 46:37
- Label: Baroque Folk
- Producer: Peter Asher

Susanna Hoffs chronology
Bright Lights (2021)	The Deep End (2023)	The Lost Record (2024)

The Deep End is the fifth solo album by Susanna Hoffs, released on April 7, 2023, on her own Baroque Folk label. It is an album of covers, featuring versions of tracks including "Under My Thumb" by the Rolling Stones and "You Don't Own Me" by Lesley Gore, as well as renditions of songs by contemporary artists including Joy Oladokun, Holly Humberstone, and Dodie. The album was produced by Peter Asher. Hoffs said in an interview with Lily Moayeri of Spin that she had started work on the album in 2021, after learning that Asher, a producer she admired, was interested in working with her. The choice of tracks on the album includes selections both by Hoffs and by Asher.

Hoffs told James Rettig of Stereogum that she had decided to swap the male and female positions from the original "Under My Thumb" so that "the boy is under her thumb". She described how "It was exhilarating to give it a new spin, to flip it on its head, or on its ass. It's a sassy, irreverent song, so it was extremely pleasurable to turn the tables."

Professional reviews
Review scores
Source	Rating
AllMusic	3.5/5 stars
American Songwriter	3.5/5 stars

Stephen Thomas Erlewine of AllMusic felt that "The blend of old and new is skillful and handsome, as is the album as a whole; it serves as a testament to Hoffs' taste as a fan and record-maker." Commenting that the renditions "sometimes render the songs unrecognizable—in a good way", Moayeri praised Hoff's voice as "immediately recognizable, clear and sweet, hitting all the notes she did some 40 years ago". Gary Graff also felt that Hoffs's vocals were as good as decades previously, writing that "This latest trip into others' songs is yet another delight, a demonstration of good taste and guts with Hoffs sounding as beguiling as she did lighting "Eternal Flame" or having a "Manic Monday" more than 30 years ago." A less effusive review was provided by American Songwriter's Hal Horowitz, although, like Erlewine, he awarded the album 3.5 stars out of 5. Horowitz felt that Hoffs's "generally laid back" style was not a good fit for tracks such as "You Don't Own Me" or "Black Coffee in Bed", although he felt that there were "more hits than misses" on the album.

== Track listing ==
Track listing for The Deep End
#	Title	Original performer(s)
1.	"Under My Thumb"	the Rolling Stones
2.	"Deep End"	Holly Humberstone
3.	"If You've Got a Problem"	Joy Oladokun
4.	"Time Moves On"	Phantom Planet
5.	"Afterglow"	Ed Sheeran
6.	"Say You Don't Mind"	Denny Laine
7.	"Black Coffee in Bed"	Squeeze
8.	"West Coast"	Jason Schwartzman (Coconut Records)
9.	"Would You Be So Kind"	Dodie
10.	"When the Party's Over"	Billie Eilish
11.	"Pawn Shop"	Brandy Clark
12.	"You Don't Own Me"	Lesley Gore
13.	"Only You"	Yazoo

== Personnel ==
- Susanna Hoffs – vocals, tambourine (1, 3, 8), handclaps (1), backing vocals (4, 8, 12, 13)
- Jeff Alan Ross – vibraphone (1, 7), glockenspiel (1, 13), handclaps (1), Wurlitzer electric piano (2, 3, 7, 8, 10), 12-string guitar (2), backing vocals (2, 5, 12), acoustic piano (4, 5, 8, 10, 12, 13), keyboards [bass/marimba/orchestra bells/baritone sax] (4), acoustic guitars (4, 9, 11), baritone guitar (5), guitars (7), cimbalom (12), organ (13), harpsichord (13)
- Dillon Margolis – handclaps (1), Hammond B3 organ (11)
- Waddy Wachtel – electric guitars (1, 2, 4, 5, 7, 10)
- Peter Asher – handclaps (1), acoustic guitar (2, 3, 5, 7, 10), backing vocals (2, 5, 12), claves (4), percussion (4), congas (8), djembe (8)
- Dan Dugmore – pedal steel guitar (2, 11)
- Danny Kortchmar – electric guitars (3), guitars (12)
- John Jorgenson – mandolin (5, 7, 9), clarinet (6), electric guitars (8), bassoon (10)
- Albert Lee – lead guitar (7, 11)
- Leland Sklar – bass (1–3, 5, 7–13)
- Russ Kunkel – drums (1–3, 5, 7, 9–13), tambourine (7, 13), bells (7), percussion (11)
- Abe Rounds – drums (4, 8, 10)
- Thomas Wooten – trumpet (13)
- Steve Aho – string quartet arrangements (1, 3, 6, 7, 11), timpani (2–5, 7, 8, 12), percussion (8, 9), glockenspiel (9)
- Matthew Sheeran – string quartet arrangements (2, 4, 5, 8–10, 12), string and trumpet arrangements (13)
- Ledisi – backing vocals (1, 3, 7, 12)
- Bill Cinque – backing vocals (2, 5, 12)
