= Susanna Hoffs (album) =

Studio album by Susanna Hoffs
- Released: September 24, 1996
- Genre: Rock
- Length: 52:56
- Label: London
- Producers: David Baerwald, David Kitay, Jack Joseph Puig and Susanna Hoffs

Susanna Hoffs chronology
When You're a Boy (1991)	Susanna Hoffs (1996)	Under the Covers, Vol. 1 (2006)

Susanna Hoffs is the second solo album by Susanna Hoffs. The style of the album is more folk-oriented than her earlier work. Columbia Records disagreed with this style and dropped her from their roster, resulting in Hoffs signing to London Records. Three songs rejected by Columbia appeared on the album, including "Enormous Wings", "Darling One" and "Happy Place". Another one, "Catch the Wind", appeared on the CD single release of "All I Want". "All I Want" hit number 77 on the Billboard Hot 100 and spent twelve weeks on the chart.

The album is much more personal and deals with issues like abusive relationships and insecurities; "Weak with Love" is about John Lennon's assassination. The album was promoted by forming a band for an extensive tour.

The album was released to enthusiastic reviews but, like its predecessor, it failed to sell as well as expected.

== Reception ==
Professional ratings
Review scores
Source	Rating
AllMusic	4/5 stars
Chicago Tribune	3/4 stars
Entertainment Weekly	B
Q	3/5 stars

AllMusic reviewer Stephen Thomas Erlewine stated that Susanna Hoffs is "a remarkably accomplished and catchy collection of mature jangle-pop, power-pop and ballads". Wook Kim of Entertainment Weekly noted Hoffs "performs a small act of bravery".

Music & Media named it Album of the Week, noting "Naturally Hoffs has given up on her cute girl act. Just like fellow female Angeleno Belinda Carlisle, she has returned with a mature new sound, which she developed by herself...The result is a place where Sheryl Crow and her Tuesday Night Club were enjoying themselves before Crow moved on to more personal, darker pastures."

== Track listing ==
#	Title	Composers	Length
1.	"Beekeeper's Blues"	Susanna Hoffs, David Baerwald, David Kitay	3:55
2.	"All I Want"	Ian Broudie, Peter Coyle	3:18
3.	"Enormous Wings"	Mark Linkous, Hoffs	3:47
4.	"Falling"	Hoffs, Charlotte Caffey, Roger Manning	4:12
5.	"Darling One"	Hoffs, Linkous, David Lowery, Davey Faragher	5:33
6.	"King of Tragedy"	Hoffs, Baerwald, Jim Keltner, Greg Leisz, Larry Klein, Kitay	4:14
7.	"Eyes of a Baby"	Hoffs, Baerwald, Keltner, Leisz, Klein, Kitay	4:51
8.	"Grand Adventure"	Baerwald, Hoffs, Kitay, Leisz	4:11
9.	"Happy Place"	Linkous, Lowery	3:10
10.	"Those Days Are Over"	Hoffs, Baerwald, Kitay	4:04
11.	"Weak with Love"	Keltner, Hoffs, Baerwald, Klein, Kitay, Dan Schwartz	4:18
12.	"To Sir with Love"	Don Black, Mark London	2:52
13.	"Stuck in the Middle with You"	Gerry Rafferty, Joe Egan	3:42

== Personnel ==
- Susanna Hoffs – vocals, backing vocals (1, 3–8, 11), guitars (1, 3–5, 7–11)
- Jon Brion – keyboards (1, 2, 4), guitars (1, 2, 4, 7, 9), bass (1), percussion (1), drums (2)
- Jason Falkner – keyboards (1, 9), chimes (1), percussion (2–4, 9), organ (3), guitars (3, 4, 7, 9), bass (3, 4, 7, 9), drums (7)
- Kevin Gilbert – keyboards (1, 5–8, 10, 11)
- Chris Fudurich – keyboards (10)
- David Baerwald – guitars (1, 5–8, 10, 11), keyboards (7), percussion (11), backing vocals (11)
- David Kitay – guitars (1, 5, 6, 8), bass (7, 10), percussion (8)
- Bill Bonk – guitars (2)
- Anders Rundblad – guitars (2)
- Greg Leisz – guitars (3–8, 10, 11)
- Mark Linkous – guitars (3), banjo (3)
- Charlotte Caffey – guitars (4)
- Bruce Kaphan – pedal steel guitar (9)
- Linda Perry – guitars (11), backing vocals (11)
- Jeff Trott – guitars (11)
- Davey Faragher – bass (3), backing vocals (3)
- Larry Klein – bass (5, 6, 11), guitars (10), backing vocals (11)
- Daniel Schwartz – bass (8, 11)
- Curt Bisquera – drums (1, 2), percussion (1)
- Michael Urbano – drums (3)
- Mick Fleetwood – drums (4)
- Jim Keltner – drums (5, 6, 10, 11)
- Brian MacLeod – drums (7–9), percussion (8, 9, 11)
- Jeremy Stacey – drums (7)
- Lenny Castro – percussion (4, 9)
- Bill Bottrell – percussion (11), cello (11), backing vocals (11)
- Thomas Caffey – strings (2, 4)
- Petra Haden – backing vocals (1)
- Rachel Haden – backing vocals (1, 5, 7, 9, 11)
- Julie Christiansen – backing vocals (11)
- Sally Djorosky – backing vocals (11)

== Production ==
- Peter Koepke – A&R
- Jack Joseph Puig – producer (1–4, 7, 9, 12.1), mixing (1–11), engineer (1–4, 6, 7, 9, 12)
- Susanna Hoffs – co-producer (1, 2, 4), producer (5, 6, 8, 10, 11)
- David Kitay – co-producer (1, 2, 4, 7, 9), producer (5, 6, 8, 10, 11)
- Matt Wallace – producer (3), engineer (3)
- David Baerwald – producer (5, 6, 8, 10, 11)
- Jim Champagne – engineer (1–4, 7, 9), assistant engineer (8, 12)
- Jerry Jordan – engineer (1, 4, 6, 9), additional engineer (8, 10)
- Michael Letho – engineer (1, 2, 4, 6–10)
- Jim Scott – engineer (1, 6–10)
- Thomas Caffey – engineer (2)
- Paul DuGre – engineer (3)
- Clif Norrell – engineer (3)
- Ken Allardyce – engineer (4), assistant engineer
- Chris Fudurich – assistant engineer (1, 4, 7–9)
- Noel Hazen – assistant engineer (3)
- Tom Nellen – assistant engineer (3)
- John Paterno – assistant engineer (3)
- Valerie Pack – A&R administration
- Rachel Stein – A&R administration
- Sharlotte Blake – project coordinator
- Kristina DiMarcco – design
- Phillip Dixon – photography
- Tim Anctil – management
- Ron Stone – management
