= Susanna Hoffs =

American musician (born 1959)

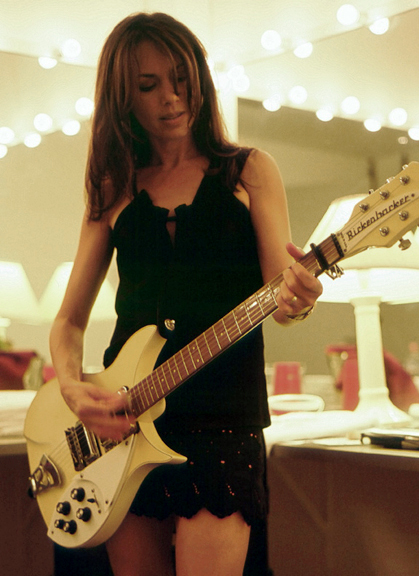
- Hoffs in 2007
- Born: Susanna Lee Hoffs; January 17, 1959 (age 67); Los Angeles, California, US
- Education: University of California, Berkeley (BA)
- Occupations: Singer; musician; songwriter; actress; author
- Years active: 1978–present
- Spouse: Jay Roach (m. 1993)
- Children: 2
- Mother: Tamar Simon Hoffs
- Musical career
- Genres: Rock; pop
- Instruments: Vocals; guitar
- Member of: The Bangles
- Formerly of: Ming Tea
- Website: susannahoffs.com

Susanna Lee Hoffs (born January 17, 1959) is an American singer, songwriter, guitarist, and actress. With Debbi Peterson and Vicki Peterson, she founded the Bangles in 1981. Their debut album, All Over the Place (1984), was acclaimed by critics but sold poorly. Their second album, Different Light (1986), was also warmly received by critics and was certified double-platinum in 1987 and triple-platinum in 1994. It contained the US number two single "Manic Monday" written by Prince and the number one single "Walk Like an Egyptian." The group's third album, Everything (1988), included the US top ten charting "In Your Room" and number one "Eternal Flame," both written by Hoffs with Billy Steinberg and Tom Kelly. Hoffs was lead vocalist on five of the seven singles released by the Bangles, resulting in her being seen as the face of the group even though all four members shared lead vocal duties. Following tensions including resentment at Hoffs' perceived leadership and the stress of touring, the band split in 1989. They reformed in 1999 and released the albums Doll Revolution (2003) and Sweetheart of the Sun (2011).

Hoffs' first solo album, When You're a Boy (1991), was followed by Susanna Hoffs (1996). Neither of the releases proved to be as popular as the Bangles' albums, although they yielded two charting singles in the US, the top 40 hit "My Side of the Bed", and "All I Want". She recorded several songs for films and formed the faux-British 1960s band Ming Tea with Mike Myers and Matthew Sweet. Hoffs teamed with Sweet to produce Under the Covers, a series of cover song albums. Her 2012 album Someday was followed by two more cover albums Bright Lights (2021) and The Deep End (2023).

Hoffs' first novel, This Bird Has Flown, a romantic comedy about a struggling musician, was published by Little Brown in 2023. It received favorable reviews, and Universal Pictures purchased the rights to the novel for a screen adaptation.

== Early life ==
Susanna Lee Hoffs was born in Los Angeles, California, on January 17, 1959. (Note: Colin Larkin's The Encyclopedia of Popular Music has Newport Beach as Hoffs' birthplace. Some sources give different years for her birth date, including 1957, 1959, and 1962.) She is the daughter of film director/writer/producer Tamar Ruth (née Simon) and Joshua Allen Hoffs, a psychoanalyst. Her family is Jewish. She has two brothers, John and Jesse. She has said that her home environment "wasn't really traditional" and that it was an "atheist, intellectual, creative world". She said that while her mother was religious and kept kosher during her own childhood, her father was secular. Her maternal grandfather, Ralph Simon, was a rabbi in Chicago and her maternal uncle, Matthew Simon, was rabbi emeritus for the B'nai Israel Congregation of Maryland and marched with Martin Luther King Jr. during the Civil Rights movement. Hoffs visited Israel for the first time at the age of 12 to see her grandparents, and she celebrated her bat mitzvah at the King David Hotel in Jerusalem.

Hoffs took ballet classes as a child, and started playing guitar in elementary school, learning chords from her uncle. She attended Palisades High School, and received a bachelor's degree in art in 1980 from the University of California, Berkeley, where she switched majors between dance, theater, film, and art. While in college, she worked as a production assistant and made her acting debut as part of a cast that included Richie Davis, Rae Dawn Chong, and Dennis Franz, in the 1978 film Stony Island directed by Andrew Davis and co-written by her mother. With college friends, she attended the final Sex Pistols show at Winterland Ballroom and a Patti Smith concert that inspired her to pursue a career in music.

In the late 1970s, while a student at UC Berkeley, Hoffs and her then-boyfriend David Roback formed the Psychiatrists, later changing their name to the Unconscious. In one account, Hoffs said that the short-lived group would perform for 50 minutes, to reflect the duration of "psychiatrists' hours", but in a 2012 interview she said that this early group never performed in public.

== The Bangles ==
=== The Bangs: first releases and name change ===
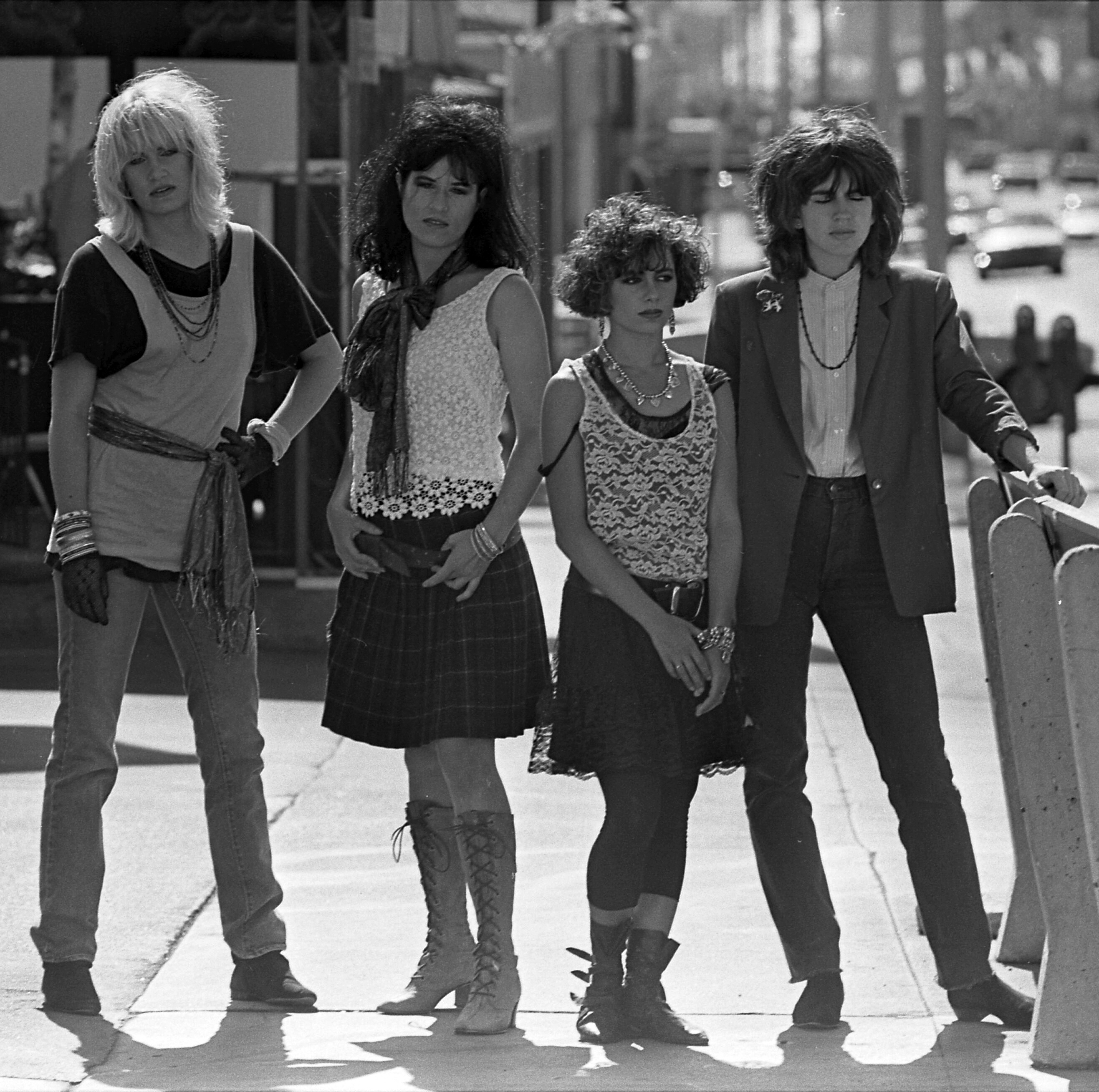
The Bangles in 1984. From left: Debbi Peterson, Vicki Peterson, Susanna Hoffs and Michael Steele.

Back home after college in the summer and fall of 1980, Hoffs sought potential bandmates by posting an ad in the local free newspaper The Recycler, and leaving hand-drawn flyers in the ladies' room of the Whisky a Go Go at a Go-Go's concert. In December, she answered an advertisement looking for musicians to join a group.

The woman who had placed the ad had previously been in a band with sisters Vicki and Debbi Peterson and shared a house with them, but was not at home when Susanna called. When Vicki picked up the phone, she and Susanna hit it off, talking about favorite bands and the recent death of John Lennon, and what he meant to them both. When the Petersons met up with Hoffs at the latter's apartment in her parents' garage in Brentwood, they decided to start a band.

They originally named their group the Colours, but changed it to the Supersonic Bangs after Hoffs saw an article about 1960s hairstyles in an old copy of Esquire – and subsequently shortened their name to the Bangs. Hoffs said that the group "liked the double-entendre of the name" and that "you can read a lot into it. There was something kind of gutsy about it." Annette Zilinskas joined as the group's bass player alongside Hoffs on rhythm guitar, Vicki Peterson on lead guitar, and Debbi Peterson on drums. The group's influences included The Beatles, The Beach Boys, and The Hollies, among other '60s groups. Hoffs and the Petersons shared lead vocals.

Hoffs said that the band's "first real performance" was at Laird International Studios, where Vicki worked as a secretary. The Bangs played other venues and began to gain a following in Los Angeles and the San Fernando Valley throughout 1981, and recorded their debut single, "Getting Out of Hand" b/w "Call on Me," releasing it on their own Downkiddie Records label. The first pressing of 1,000 copies would soon sell out, and subsequent pressings would eventually reflect their next name change. In a 1987 Rolling Stone article, the critic Susan Orlean described the band's early audience as "mostly boys, who appreciated their tough-enough music and playfully flirtatious stage presence". Author James Dickerson later characterized the group's loyal audience as "made up of horny high-school and college-age males who relished their in-your-face sexuality", and commented that the musicians had gained their success through their own efforts, without intervention from any man.

Miles Copeland of I.R.S. Records saw the Bangs at a show and signed them to his Faulty Products label. He had previously signed the Go-Go's, likewise an all-female band, whose albums had been commercially successful. In 1982, following a legal claim by another group called the Bangs, Hoffs and her bandmates changed their name again to the Bangles. Meanwhile, Faulty Products folded, and the band's self-titled EP was eventually released on I.R.S. Records in 1982. In 1983, the group was signed to Columbia Records, and Zilinskas left and was replaced by Michael Steele. Hoffs also played a role in a student film in 1982, The Haircut, a comedy short starring John Cassavetes.

=== Critical and commercial success ===
The Bangles released their first full album, All Over the Place, in 1984 on Columbia Records; it was acclaimed by critics but sold poorly. Their breakthrough was the 1986 single "Manic Monday", written by Prince, which reached number two on the charts in the US, the UK, West Germany and Austria, as well as reaching number one in South Africa and the top five in Sweden, Switzerland and Norway. This single was included on the album Different Light (1986), which was warmly received by critics and was certified double-platinum in 1987, then triple-platinum in 1994. "Walk Like an Egyptian" from the same album reached number one in the US in December 1986, and was their first American gold record single. It also became number one in the charts for Australia, Canada, the Netherlands, South Africa, Spain, and West Germany. Dickerson wrote that "Manic Monday" and "Walk Like an Egyptian" were more appealing to women and girls than the band's previous records had been. Hoffs first met Prince in 1984 and the pair spoke regularly. He attended some of the group's concerts and occasionally appeared on stage with them. Paul Evans and Ernesto Lechner of The New Rolling Stone Album Guide (2004) wrote that Hoffs had "mastered a singing style that combined pep, coy sweetness, and an occasional plaintive resonance".

In the music video for "Walk Like an Egyptian", during a close-up of Hoffs' face, she moves her eyes from side to side. Hoffs recounted that she had been looking at selected members of the crowd to counter stage fright, and had not realized it would be a focal point in the video. Tom Breihan of Stereogum wrote of the scene: "But it's so cool. It makes her look like she's up to some mischief." The television director Marty Callner later said: "I saw situations where one shot would make a star, like with Susanna Hoffs and 'Walk Like an Egyptian.' That thing she did with her eyes." In 2011, she said: "I guess it's become an iconic moment in that video, and I didn't even realize it was happening."

A 1986 London performance by the Bangles was reviewed by David Sinclair of The Times, who felt that the band "proved unconvincing in performance", although Hoffs "was by and large the best at creating a mood of emotional involvement. Her clear, fragile voice and coquettish enunciation were reminiscent of Stevie Nicks." In the same paper a few months later, Richard Williams also compared Hoffs to Nicks, writing that Hoffs' "dark eyes, dangerous pout and fancifully sexy costumes [that] match her sultry voice" were reminiscent of the Fleetwood Mac singer. He concluded that Hoffs was "an equally obvious candidate for a successful solo career".

The Bangles had another US number two single with a cover of Simon & Garfunkel's "A Hazy Shade of Winter" released in late 1987 and reaching its peak position in February 1988. Following a successful tour, the group issued their third and final Columbia album Everything in 1988. The first single, "In Your Room", co-written by Hoffs with Billy Steinberg and Tom Kelly, became a US top ten hit. The same album included their second US number one, and second American gold record single, "Eternal Flame", which was also co-written by Hoffs, Steinberg and Kelly. The single also topped the chart in eight other countries. Hoffs sang the studio recording of "Eternal Flame" naked due to producer Davitt Sigerson pranking her by telling her Olivia Newton-John had done the same thing. He later told Hoffs he had just been pulling her leg. As the studio was dark, and Hoffs was standing behind a sound baffle, she could not be seen.

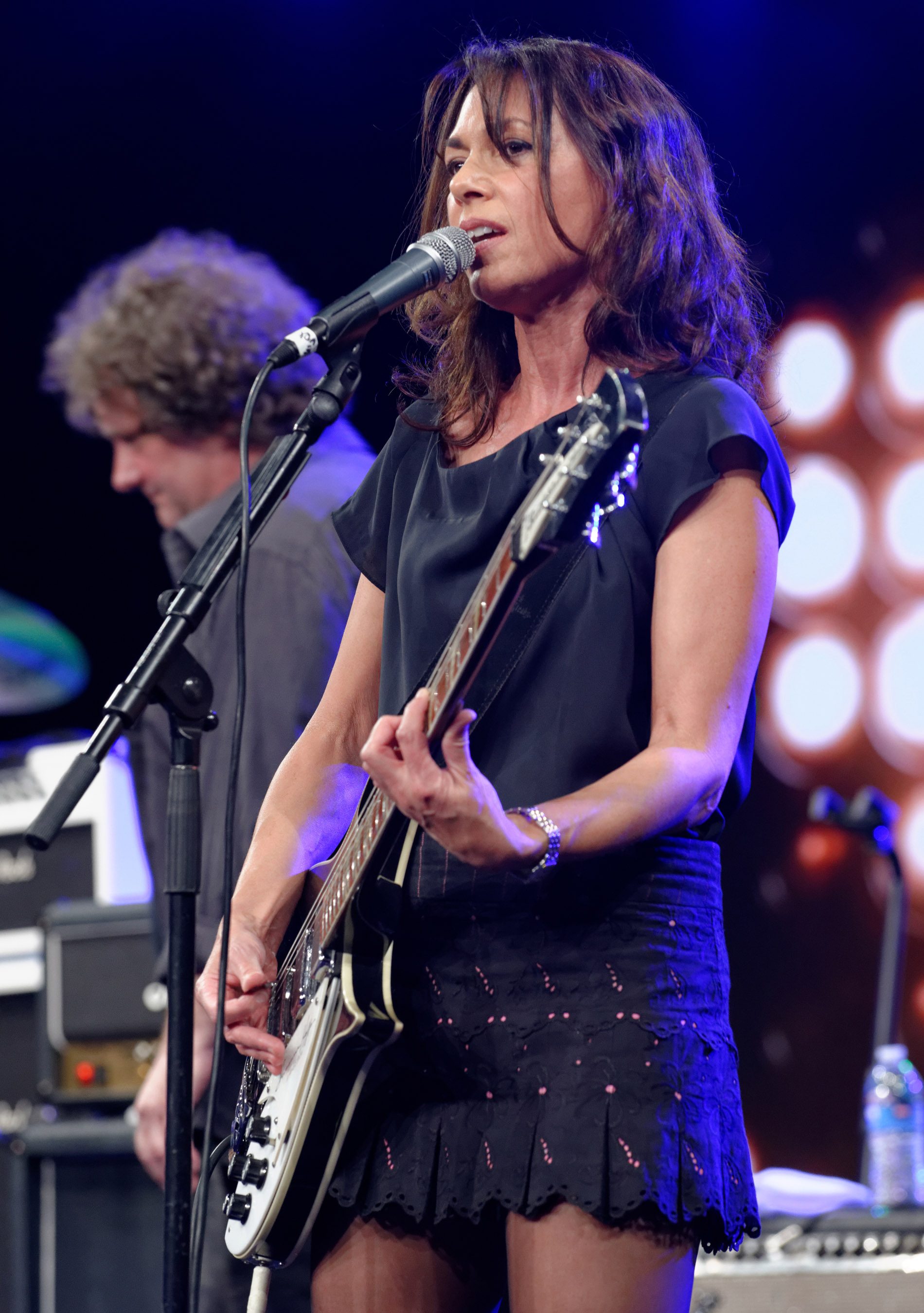
Hoffs performing as part of the Bangles at the NAMM Show in 2015. The group was presented with an Icon Award at the show, 30 years after their debut album.

Hoffs was lead vocalist on five of the seven Columbia singles by the Bangles, leading to a public perception that she was the primary singer and face of the group, even though all four members shared lead vocals, and Steele and Peterson did most of the talking between songs in concert. As she was shorter in height than the other band members, photographs tended to feature her at front. She was the lead actress in The Allnighter (1987) and gained Prince's attention. Orlean wrote that the cumulative effect was to "vault Susanna into beyond-Bangles celebrity status".

=== Disbandment and aftermath ===
In 1989, while still popular, the Bangles disbanded to undertake individual projects. There had been tensions and disquiet in the group since Different Light; they saw themselves as musical creators, but their biggest successes had been versions of songs written by others. The public perception of Hoffs as bandleader took a toll on group harmony. In an interview for a 2002 book, Hoffs pinpointed the stress of touring as the breaking point. In her account, she recalled that the band members were tired and reluctant to tour, but agreed to do so at the behest of their management and record company, and in response to demand from their fans. According to the book's authors Lee Miller and Jessica Miller, "The situation deteriorated so badly that they canceled the tour abruptly and the band split up. Susanna always blamed the stress of that final tour for the breakup".

Hoffs contacted the other members of the Bangles in the late 1990s with the hope of reuniting. In 2008, she told Andrew Murfett of The Age: "I wanted to do new Bangles music. I was driving the other girls crazy calling them. I didn't want to be a 'greatest hits' band. I wanted to write and sing new songs. That was really important to Vicki and Debbie, too. We didn't want to go on a 'Ladies of the 1980s' tour." The reunited Bangles played at a Beatles tribute concert conducted by George Martin, and recorded the single "Get the Girl" for the second Austin Powers film in 1999. In 2000 they announced their decision to reunite full-time. Hoffs recounted that following the experiences that led to the group disbanding in 1989, the band members agreed that each would have a veto on the group's proposed activities. Their fourth album, Doll Revolution, was released in 2003; it received positive reviews, and sold moderately well. The group embarked on a tour following its release. Their fifth album, Sweetheart of the Sun, was released in 2011; it received an average score of 69 on review aggregator site Metacritic, indicating "generally favorable reviews".

Evans and Lechner felt that the band "achieved gigantically the dubious triumph of sound over significance", and of the "inevitable reunion" that "even nostalgia has its limits". Robert Christgau rated all of the albums from their first incarnation B− or above and gave Doll Revolution three stars.

== Solo career ==
Before the Bangles' breakthrough with Different Light, Hoffs contributed lead vocals to covers of Bob Dylan's "I'll Keep It with Mine" and Lou Reed's "I'll Be Your Mirror" on the 1984 self-titled album by Rainy Day. Led by her former collaborator at Berkeley David Roback (who would later form Mazzy Star), the project also included Vicki Peterson and members of other Paisley Underground bands – The Dream Syndicate, The Three O'Clock, and Rain Parade, with Roback's brother Steven. "I'll Keep It with Mine" was issued as the A-side of Rainy Day's only single.

In 1987, Hoffs starred in the comedy film The Allnighter, directed by her mother Tamar Simon Hoffs, and co-starring Joan Cusack and Pam Grier. Glenn Kenny wrote in Video Review that Hoffs' character was "full of spunk" like her Bangles persona, but less "savvy", concluding that the film was "unextraordinary and inoffensive". While he felt that Hoffs' acting abilities were on a par with her more seasoned castmates, Patrick Goldstein of the Los Angeles Times argued that "It's her character we have trouble with", and panned the film. The New York Times critic Janet Maslin disparaged the work as "outstandingly dim". Richard Harrington of The Washington Post also dismissed the film, and wrote that Hoffs appeared "stiff [and] self-conscious". It was commercially unsuccessful. Hoffs said she expected it to fare better on home video, as the production was more suitable for home than cinema viewing. She later told journalist Chris Hunt: "It was such a low budget quickie thing, a cutesy little teeny-bopper movie. It wasn't a great movie but the whole experience of it was great."

Hoffs' debut solo studio album, When You're a Boy, was released by Columbia Records in January 1991, 10 years to the month from the earliest days of the Bangles. The leadoff track and first single, "My Side of the Bed", reached the US Billboard Top 40 and also charted in the UK at number 44. The album also includes "Unconditional Love" (co-written by Cyndi Lauper) and ends with a cover of "Boys Keep Swinging", a 1979 song written by David Bowie and Brian Eno. The album's critical reception was mixed and it was not a commercial success compared with the Bangles; it reached number 83 on the US album charts and number 56 in the UK. In The Times, critic David Sinclair felt that with the exception of the Bowie cover, the album was an "airbrushed exercise in boredom". It was also rated a "dud" by Robert Christgau in the Village Voice. In The Encyclopedia of Popular Music, Colin Larkin gave the album 2 out of 5 stars, arguing that it "failed to maintain the interest of the mainstream fans who had discovered the Bangles in the wake of the smash single 'Eternal Flame', while simultaneously alienating the Paisley Underground loyalists with its AOR [adult-oriented rock] clichés". The Trouser Press Record Guide entry on Hoffs by Ira Robbins panned the album as a "no-holds-barred commercial bore". Not all critics were as harsh. In his upbeat assessment for The Globe and Mail, Alan Neister found the album as good as the Bangles' best work: "Both as a songwriter and a song consumer, Hoffs has an ear fine-tuned to a great hook, and there isn't a song on this album that isn't hummable on the very first listen." Jimmy Nicol of Q Magazine gave the album 4 out of 5 stars and wrote that Hoffs was extending into "undreamed of territories", adding: "She reveals herself to be a highly inventive composer, lyricist – and even humourist."

After a followup recorded in 1994 for Columbia was shelved, Hoffs signed with London Records for her second solo album, Susanna Hoffs, issued in 1996. Stephen Thomas Erlewine of AllMusic praised it as an "infectious and engaging set of melodic pop that also happens to be Hoffs' most introspective and personal record to date". Wook Kim of Entertainment Weekly remarked that Hoffs "performs a small act of bravery", yet Larkin wrote that only one song, "King Of Tragedy", "had the edgy pop fizz of the Bangles' best work." Billboard reviewed the single, "Only Love", writing: "Energetic and harmonious ditty recalls heyday of '60s-era girl groups. Lots of fun."

Hoffs also contributed songs to film soundtracks and other projects. In 1992, she covered the Oingo Boingo song "We Close Our Eyes" for the Buffy the Vampire Slayer soundtrack, and her cover of the We Five hit "You Were On My Mind" was on the soundtrack of the crime drama Fathers & Sons. She also provided the title song for the 1995 film Now and Then, and recorded versions of Burt Bacharach songs for the soundtracks of two Austin Powers films – "The Look of Love" for the first film in 1997, and "Alfie" for the third, Austin Powers in Goldmember. Hoffs also appears as a member of the fictional band Ming Tea in the Powers films, directed by her husband, Jay Roach. Hoffs also contributed versions of "The Water Is Wide" and Donovan's "Catch the Wind" for the soundtrack of Tamar Simon Hoffs' 2003 film Red Roses and Petrol.

Hoffs self-released her third solo album of new material (and her first full album since 1996), Someday, on her Baroque Folk label on July 17, 2012. It was distributed by Vanguard Records. American Songwriter gave Someday a rating of 4.5 out of 5 stars and described it as "easily and undeniably Hoffs' most definitive musical statement to date". James Reed from the Boston Globe wrote: "Someday reminds you that Hoffs is perfectly suited to sunny, winsome material ... her performance on Someday isn't that removed from how she sounded on say, 'Eternal Flame'." The tracks include a newly recorded version of "November Sun", which Hoffs had initially recorded for another unrealized album project in 2000. Produced by Mitchell Froom, the album is influenced by the music of the 1960s and features Davey Faragher and Pete Thomas from Elvis Costello's band, the Imposters, and keyboards and orchestration by Froom. Larkin wrote: "The Bangles folded in 1989 partly because Susanna Hoffs was being touted as the 'star' in a previously egalitarian band. It is ironic, therefore, that her solo career failed to come close to the success enjoyed by her old band." Hoffs contributed vocals to "One Voice", the end credits song for the film A Dog Named Gucci (2016), a track also featuring Norah Jones, Aimee Mann, Lydia Loveless, Neko Case, Brian May and Kathryn Calder. "One Voice" was released on Record Store Day, April 16, 2016, with profits from the sale of the single going to benefit animal charities.

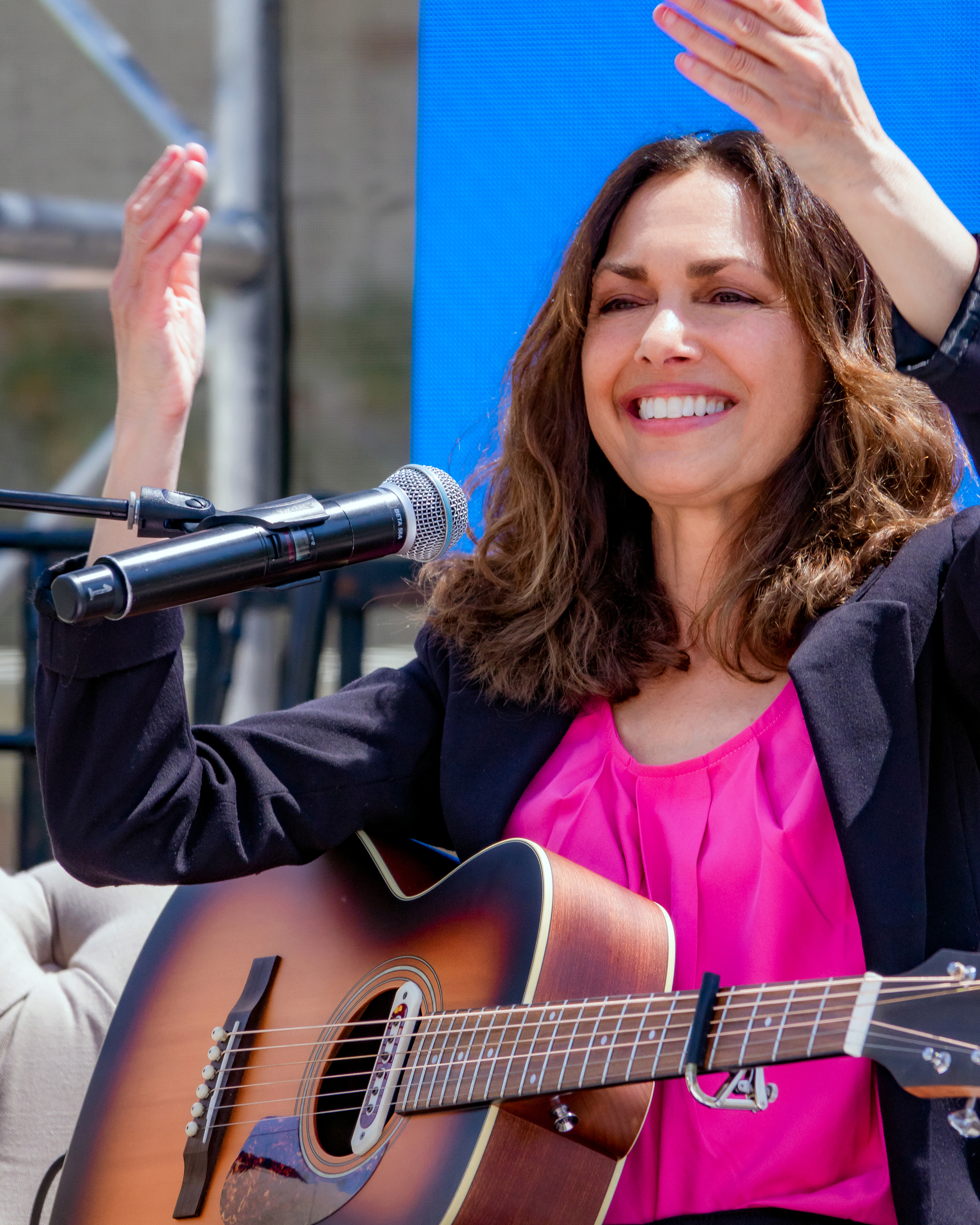
Hoffs at the Los Angeles Times Festival of Books, April 23, 2023

Bright Lights, Hoffs' fourth studio album, was released on Baroque Folk Records in 2021. The record was produced by Paul Bryan and features versions of songs by Nick Drake, Michael Nesmith, Richard Thompson, Pete Ham and Tom Evans of Badfinger, and other songwriters. The album includes "Name of the Game", featuring Mann. Jonathan Keefe of In Review Online wrote, "Hoffs is in fantastic voice throughout the album" and praised the versatility of her renditions.

Her fifth solo album, 2023's The Deep End, was produced by Peter Asher. The album includes interpretations of songs by the Rolling Stones, Squeeze, and Lesley Gore and received favorable reviews; Lily Moayeri of Spin Magazine wrote, "Hoffs' voice is immediately recognizable, clear and sweet, hitting all the notes she did some 40 years ago. But her singular interpretations are so unique, they sometimes render the songs unrecognizable—in a good way." Gary Graff of Ultimate Classic Rock wrote that the album was a "delight, a demonstration of good taste and guts with Hoffs sounding as beguiling as she did lighting 'Eternal Flame' or having a 'Manic Monday' more than 30 years ago".

Hoffs has co-written songs for the Go-Go's, Belinda Carlisle, and Bette Midler, among other artists; and has sung on albums by Rufus Wainwright and Travis. She is included on the Lilith Fair: A Celebration of Women in Music compilation album (with Sarah McLachlan, Shawn Colvin, Emmylou Harris, and others). In 1992, she won Best Female Rock Vocalist at the Pro L.A. Music Awards.

In 2019, Hoffs inducted the Zombies into the Rock and Roll Hall of Fame. In her tribute to the band, she recalled first hearing their music in the 1960s and how it inspired her to become a singer and songwriter. At the close of the ceremony, Hoffs performed with the "all-star" lineup that included Colin Blunstone, Rod Argent, Brian May, and Joe Elliott for a performance of All the Young Dudes.

Hoffs' debut as an author, This Bird Has Flown, a romantic comic novel about a struggling musician in her 30s, was published by Little Brown in 2023. The book received a favorable review in the New York Times from Beatriz Williams, who called it "the smart, ferocious, rock-chick redemption romance you didn't know you needed". Positive critical commentary also came from Mark Weingarten in the Los Angeles Times, Michael Schaub of NPR, and from Kirkus Reviews. Universal Pictures purchased the rights to the novel for a screen adaptation.

In 2024, Hoffs released The Lost Record, an album of songs she had recorded in her garage in 1999. Produced by Hoffs and Dan Schwartz, the album includes "Life on the Inside" (co-written with Jane Wiedlin and Charlotte Caffey of The Go-Go's). In 2025, she was a featured performer at "People Have the Power: A Celebration of Patti Smith" at Carnegie Hall, which included performances by Bruce Springsteen, Chrissie Hynde, and Michael Stipe. Rolling Stone wrote, "Hoffs delivered an excellent rendition of 'Kimberly,'" and Variety said "Hoffs' pop-influenced interpretation of 'Kimberly' was joyful."

In 2026, Hoffs was a featured performer at Love Rocks benefit concert with artists including Paul Simon, Mary J. Blige, Hozier, Elvis Costello, Jon Batiste, and Mavis Staples. That same year, she released the album The List, with all songs co-written by Hoffs, produced by CJ Camerieri, and featured artists including Rufus Wainwright, Edie Brickell, Dan Wilson, Jesse Harris, Greg Leisz, Ryan Lerman, and Spencer Zahn. In support of her album release, Hoffs performed in September at Largo at the Coronet as well as being the opening act for several of Billy Idol's “It's a Nice Day To... Tour Again!” concerts, followed by a sold out 5-night residency at the Carlyle in NYC.

== Other collaborations ==
=== Ming Tea ===
Mike Myers, musician Matthew Sweet, and Hoffs formed the core of the faux-British 1960s band Ming Tea after Myers left Saturday Night Live in the early 1990s. With Myers developing the Austin Powers character he had created, and with Hoffs pausing her solo career, they first met to play informally and all adopted pseudonyms for the band – Sweet became Sid Belvedere, and Hoffs became Gillian Shagwell. The trio played live at nightclubs in Los Angeles. Myers' then-wife, Robin Ruzan, encouraged him to write a film based on the character. The result was Austin Powers: International Man of Mystery, directed by Hoffs' husband Jay Roach. Ming Tea appeared in all three Austin Powers films and recorded the songs "BBC" and "Daddy Wasn't There" for two of the soundtrack albums.

=== With Matthew Sweet ===
Hoffs teamed with Sweet, as "Sid and Susie", to record several cover versions of classic rock songs from the 1960s for their album Under the Covers, Vol. 1 (2006). Hoffs and Sweet released a follow-up, Under the Covers, Vol. 2 in 2009, featuring songs from the 1970s by Fleetwood Mac, Carly Simon, and Rod Stewart, among others. Under the Covers, Vol. 3 was released in 2013, featuring cover songs from the 1980s, the decade when both of their careers began; the album included covers of songs by the Smiths, the Pretenders, and Roxy Music. In 2013, Hoffs collaborated with Sweet and Tim Robbins on a recording of the traditional song "Marianne" for the sea shanty–themed compilation Son of Rogues Gallery: Pirate Ballads, Sea Songs & Chanteys.

== Equipment ==
She has often used Rickenbacker guitars.

Hoffs learned to play electric guitar on a Gibson SG. Influenced by the Byrds and the Beatles, she changed to a Rickenbacker because she liked its "jangly, bright sound" and purchased a 1960s model with black and white checked binding. She used this on the early Bangles recordings, but after some work on the guitar that affected its feel, she bought a Rickenbacker 325. She is depicted on the cover of All Over the Place holding her Rickenbacker 325V63. Musicologist Peter Mercer-Taylor observed that it was "a black and white 6-string with three pick-ups and a hole for a vibrato bar, though the bar is not in place. Shortly after its 1963 appearance, this had become John Lennon's signature instrument."

Hoffs used the 325 on some of the band's recordings, but found it hard to tune, and said that it "ended up being more of a video guitar". For some time, her main instrument was a borrowed Fender Telecaster, and she also used a Fender Stratocaster (including for live shows in 1984 and 1985); two Rickenbacker 350s and two Rickenbacker 620/12s (obtained during the Different Light sessions); and a Fritz Brothers Roy Buchanan Bluesmaster. She contributed to the design of a Susanna Hoffs model of the Rickenbacker 350 released in 1988 and 1989.

After the dissolution of the Bangles, Hoffs played a Taylor K22; she later worked with Taylor on the Susanna Hoffs Signature Series of guitars. She also has a 1966 12-string Guild Starfire which she says provides an "incredible bright-but-warm sound", as used for tracks on Doll Revolution.

== Personal life ==
She dated the actor Michael J. Fox for a short period in 1986, although both have claimed to have no memory of it. In 1988 she met the actor Donovan Leitch, and the pair were in a relationship that lasted for about two years until 1991. She married filmmaker Jay Roach in 1993, and they have two sons, born in 1995 and 1998. Roach converted to Judaism when they married. In a 2023 interview with Debbie Millman for Print magazine, Hoffs said, "In my life, it took many relationships to realize that Jay was the right partner for me."

== Legacy ==
Hoffs inspired the Los Angeles–based rock band the Three O'Clock to write the song "The Girl with the Guitar (Says Oh Yeah)" for their 1985 album Arrive Without Travelling. In 2002, the alternative country artist Robbie Fulks wrote the paean "That Bangle Girl".

The Bangles are one of the most successful all-female rock bands. Like their contemporaries the Go-Go's, and Joan Jett and Suzi Quatro earlier, the Bangles composed songs and played instruments. This made them unlike most popular women musical artists of the 1980s, who were principally vocalists. The music historian Sean MacLeod posited that the success of the Go-Go's and the Bangles as women in what were usually male roles in rock music opened a path for groups like Hole, Elastica and Dum Dum Girls. The Bangles were inducted into the Vocal Group Hall of Fame in 2000, and to the Goldmine Hall of Fame in 2013. They were presented with the Icon Award at the 2015 She Rocks Awards, thirty years after the release of All Over the Place.

== Discography ==
=== Albums ===
Susanna Hoffs album releases
Year	Title	Peak chart positions					
Year	Title	US	AUS	NED	SWE	SWI	UK
1991	When You're a Boy	83	67	51	29	—	56
1996	Susanna Hoffs	—	—	—	—	50	—
2006	Under the Covers, Vol. 1 (with Matthew Sweet)	192	—	—	—	—	—
2009	Under the Covers, Vol. 2 (with Matthew Sweet)	106	—	—	—	—	—
2012	Someday	—	—	—	—	—	—
2013	Under the Covers, Vol. 3 (with Matthew Sweet)	—	—	—	—	—	72
2021	Bright Lights	—	—	—	—	—	— (Note: Bright Lights did not enter the UK Album Charts but did peak at number 83 on the UK Album Downloads Chart)
2023	The Deep End	—	—	—	—	—	—
2024	The Lost Record	—	—	—	—	—	— (Note: The Lost Record did not enter the UK Album Charts but did peak at number 100 on the UK Album Downloads Chart)
2026	The List	—	—	—	—	—	—
"—" denotes releases that did not chart or were not released in that country.

=== EPs ===
Susanna Hoffs EP releases
Year	Title
2012	Some Summer Days
2012	From Me to You

=== Singles ===
Susanna Hoffs single releases
Year	Title	Peak chart positions									Notes
Year	Title	US	AUS	AUT	GER	NED	NZ	SWE	SWI	UK	Notes
Solo releases
1991	"My Side of the Bed"	30	54	20	36	23	33	23	20	44	
1991	"Unconditional Love"	—	100	—	—	—	—	38	—	65	
1991	"Only Love"/"You Were on My Mind"	—	135	—	—	—	—	—	—	—	
1996	"All I Want"	77	164	—	—	—	—	44	44	32	
With Ming Tea
1997	"BBC"	—	—	—	—	—	—	—	—	—	Austin Powers: International Man of Mystery soundtrack
2002	"Daddy Wasn't There"	—	—	—	—	—	—	—	—	—	Austin Powers in Goldmember soundtrack
With Travis
2020	"The Only Thing"	—	—	—	—	—	—	—	—	—	
"—" denotes releases that did not chart or were not released in that country.

=== Other appearances ===
Susanna Hoffs appearances on other albums
Year	Song(s)	Album	Notes	Ref.
1984	"Are the Beatles Really Here? Los Angeles 1966"	English as a Second Language (Freeway Records)	Spoken word	
1986	"Wild Wild Life"	True Stories	Background vocals on Talking Heads album	
1992	"We Close Our Eyes"	Buffy the Vampire Slayer (original soundtrack)	Oingo Boingo cover	
1992	"You Were on My Mind"	Fathers and Sons (Chaos Recordings)	Sylvia Fricker cover	
1995	"Now and Then"	Now and Then soundtracks	Written by Hoffs, Charlotte Caffey and Jane Wiedlin	
1997	"Stuck in the Middle with You"	Bean soundtrack	Stealers Wheel cover	
1998	"Eternal Flame"	Lilith Fair (A Celebration of Women in Music)	Written by Hoffs, Tom Kelly and Billy Steinberg	
2000	"A Fool in Love"	Meet the Parents soundtrack	Duet with Randy Newman	
2011	"Tear Off Your Own Head (It's a Doll Revolution)"	The Return of the Spectacular Spinning Songbook!!!	Guest appearance; Elvis Costello and the Imposters live album	
2013	"Marianne"	Son of Rogues Gallery: Pirate Ballads, Sea Songs & Chanteys	Credited to Tim Robbins with Matthew Sweet and Susanna Hoffs	
2023	"Twelve Thirty (Young Girls Are Coming to the Canyon)"	Folkocracy	Guest appearance; Rufus Wainwright album	

== Filmography ==
Susannah Hoffs filmography and broadcast media appearances
Year	Title	Notes	Ref.
1978	Stony Island	Directed by Andrew Davis; screenplay by Davis and Tamar Simon Hoffs	
1982	The Haircut	Short film; direction and screenplay by Tamar Simon Hoffs	
1986	True Stories	Background vocals on Wild Wild Life	
1989	Rock & Read	Children's home video (1989) / DVD (2011); written, directed and produced by Tamar Simon Hoffs	
1987	The Allnighter	Leading role as Molly; directed by Tamar Simon Hoffs	
1990	The Goonies 'R' Good Enough	Cyndi Lauper music video; Hoffs appears as a woman pirate	
1990	The Bangles – Greatest Hits: Videos	As part of the Bangles	
1991	Rapido	UK TV; guest	
1991	Rocksat	Australian radio program	
1997	Austin Powers: International Man of Mystery	Film	
1999	Austin Powers: The Spy Who Shagged Me	Film	
2000	Meet the Parents	"A Fool in Love" duet with Randy Newman	
2001	Gilmore Girls	TV; as part of the Bangles	
2001	A Fool in Love	TV; Academy Awards performance with Randy Newman	
c. 2002	Clifford the Big Red Dog	TV; voice of Courtney Amber (guest appearance)	
2002	Austin Powers in Goldmember	Film	
2003	Doll Revolution – Bonus DVD	As part of the Bangles	
2006	Late Night with Conan O'Brien	TV; guest performance	
2006	The Tonight Show with Jay Leno	TV; guest performance	
2007	Return to Bangleonia	As part of the Bangles; concert DVD	
2011	Dancing with the Stars	TV; as part of the Bangles	
2012	Comedy Bang! Bang!	TV	
2014	Volunteers of America	The Both music video; cameo appearance	
2015	Get a Room	TV; singing "Eternal Flame" in a karaoke bar	
2019	Bombshell	Vocals in film score	
2019	Rock and Roll Hall of Fame	TV; inducting the Zombies into the Rock and Roll Hall of Fame	
2020	Grammy Salute to Prince: Let's Go Crazy	TV; Manic Monday duet with Chris Martin	
2022	Grammy Salute to Paul Simon: Homeward Bound	TV; performing A Hazy Shade of Winter	
2023	The Muppets Mayhem	TV episode; guest star	
