= Danny Faragher =

Danny O. Faragher
- Born: May 15, 1947 (age 79)
- Origin: Long Beach, California, US
- Genres: soul, rock
- Occupations: musician, songwriter, bandleader
- Instruments: Harmonica, vocals, keyboard, trombone
- Years active: 1965–present
- Labels: ABC, Polydor, Signpost, MCA, Acta, Impression
- Website: dannyfaragher.com

Danny Owen Faragher (born May 15, 1947, in Long Beach, California) is an American rock/soul musician and singer and founding member of the bands: The Peppermint Trolley Company, The Faragher Brothers, Bones and The Mark Five.

== Early years ==
Danny Faragher's early years were filled with music. He took to it at a very young age and music played an important role in his childhood. In 1965, he and brother, Jimmy Faragher, still in their teens, cut their first records, with Danny's band, the Mark Five, releasing three singles with Impression Records.

== The Peppermint Trolley Company ==
From these garage band beginnings, they evolved into The Peppermint Trolley Company, one of the progenitors of the West Coast Harmony Sound, which was blossoming in the late Sixties. Their music style is now referred to as sunshine pop, psychedelic rock, or baroque pop. With fellow members, Greg Tornquist and Casey Cunningham, and working with producer Dan Dalton, the Peppermint Trolley Company had a national hit – "Baby You Come Rollin' Across My Mind", and released the album, The Peppermint Trolley Company. In addition to his vocal contributions, Faragher was an early user of the clavinet, and played original counter melodies on the trombone.

In 1968 the PTC made numerous TV appearances, including The Beverly Hillbillies, Mannix, Dick Clark's Happening '68, Upbeat and The Donald O'Connor Show. In early ’69, they recorded the original The Brady Bunch theme song.

== Bones ==
In 1969 Danny, Jimmy, Greg and Casey walked away from their contract with Acta and changed their name to Bones. Within a couple of years, they emerged with a harder rock sound infused with elements of funk and soul music. Danny moved to the B3 organ. Hooking up with producers, Richard Perry and Vini Poncia, Bones cut two albums: Bones on the Signpost label, and Waitin’ Here on MCA and had a hit with "Roberta". In ’72 the band added Patrick McClure on second guitar.

== The Faragher Brothers ==
After Bones disbanded in 1973, Danny and Jimmy formed the blue-eyed soul group The Faragher Brothers, teaming up with younger brothers Tommy Faragher and Davey Faragher. The brothers released four albums, The Faragher Brothers and Family Ties, both on ABC Records, and Open Your Eyes and The Faraghers, both on Polydor Records. Open Your Eyes and The Faraghers featured younger siblings Pammy Faragher and Marty Faragher. The band charted with the single "Stay the Night" in ’79. The group appeared on American Bandstand and Soul Train, and shared the stage with Rufus and War before calling it quits in 1980.

== Later years ==
Danny has written and performed music for the television sitcoms, The Facts of Life, and Who's the Boss?, and has also sung on the recordings of Peter Criss, Camper Van Beethoven, Melissa Manchester, David Pomerantz, Lynne Andersen, and others. As an instrumentalist, he's played harmonica, B3 organ and trombone on records of top artists, including Ringo Starr, Martha Reeves, the Pointer Sisters, Randy Edelman, E.G. Daily, and Full Swing.

Danny served as the musical director for the play, Working, at Santa Monica's Mayfair Theater, acting and singing in the production. He was a featured vocalist with the highly respected L.A. Jazz Choir and sings every Holiday Season with the Caroling Company, an a cappella group featured in The Addams Family. He also has a popular vocal group, Daddy Cool, who perform Doo-Wop and Rock and Roll tunes.

== New Recordings and Reissues ==
In 2000, the first two Faragher Brothers LPs were reissued on CD by Sony Records.

In 2009, Cherry Red/ Now Sounds, a label out of the U.K., released a CD reissue of the Peppermint Trolley Co.'s album under the title, Beautiful Sun." The CD is the same as the original release of The Peppermint Trolley Company LP, however, it is packaged with sixteen bonus tracks and includes many of the Mark V singles.

In 2005 Danny released the album Blue Little Corner an eclectic mix of Rockabilly, R&B, Soul and other traditional music styles.

In February 2015 the album Dancing with the Moment is expected to be released. It has so far received positive critical responses from sites such as Something Else Reviews Review of Danny Faragher – Dancing with the Moment and received early radio play and praise on KCSB. The album is another Eclectic selection of various genres from melodic Downtempo Ambient piano songs to uptempo EDM tracks and features Psychedelic, Soul, R&B and Electric Blues.

== Album discography ==
- 1968: "The Peppermint Trolley Co", The Peppermint Trolley Co
- 1972: "Bones (album)" – Bones
- 1973: "Waitin' Here" – Bones
- 1976: "The Faragher Brothers" – The Faragher Brothers
- 1977: "Family TIes" – The Faragher Brothers
- 1978: "The Faraghers" – The Faragher Brothers
- 2004: "Beautiful Sun" – The Peppermint Trolley Co.
- 2005: "Blue Little Corner" – Danny Faragher
- 2015: "Dancing with the Moment" – Danny Faragher
