= Bright Lights (Susanna Hoffs album) =

Studio album by Susanna Hoffs
- Released: November 12, 2021
- Genre: Rock
- Length: 35:00
- Label: Baroque Folk
- Producer: Paul Bryan

Susanna Hoffs chronology
| Under the Covers, Vol. 3 (2013) | Bright Lights (2021) | The Deep End (2023) |

Bright Lights is the fourth solo album by Susanna Hoffs. This is a covers album featuring songs originally performed by Badfinger, the Velvet Underground, and former Big Star singer Chris Bell among others. Hoffs stated, "These were songs I always admired and adored and had listened to on repeat for pure pleasure, but had never sung."

Ledger Line's Jonathan Keefe stated "Bright Lights reaffirms, then, is that Hoffs has some of the sharpest instincts in pop music."

The album featured a cover of a Badfinger track with Aimee Mann.

== Track listing ==
| # | Title | Composers | Length |
|---|---|---|---|
| 1. | "Time Will Show the Wiser" | Emitt Rhodes | 3:37 |
| 2. | "One of These Things First" | Nick Drake | 4:30 |
| 3. | "You and Your Sister" | Chris Bell | 3:18 |
| 4. | "Name of the Game" (featuring Aimee Mann) | Pete Ham | 4:49 |
| 5. | "I Want to See the Bright Lights Tonight" | Richard Thompson / Linda Thompson | 3:13 |
| 6. | "You Just May Be the One" | Michael Nesmith | 2:14 |
| 7. | "Him or Me – What's It Gonna Be" | Mark Lindsay / Terry Melcher | 2:52 |
| 8. | "Femme Fatale" | Lou Reed | 4:32 |
| 9. | "Take Me with U" | Prince | 3:29 |
| 10. | "No Good Trying" | Syd Barrett | 3:22 |

== Personnel ==
- Susanna Hoffs – vocals, harmony vocals, tambourine
- Aimee Mann – (track 4)
- Danny Kortchmar – electric guitar
- Waddy Wachtel – electric guitar
- Leland Sklar – bass
- Russell Kunkel – drums

== Charts ==
Chart performance for Bright Lights
| Chart (2022) | Peak position |
|---|---|
| UK Album Downloads (Official Charts) | 83 |
