= Someday (Susanna Hoffs album) =

Studio album by Susanna Hoffs
- Released: July 17, 2012
- Studios: Baroque Folk Studios (Los Angeles, California)
- Genre: Rock
- Length: 31:00
- Label: Baroque Folk
- Producer: Mitchell Froom

Susanna Hoffs chronology
Under the Covers, Vol. 2 (2009)	Someday (2012)	Under the Covers, Vol. 3 (2013)

Professional ratings
Review scores
Source	Rating
AllMusic	4/5 stars
New York Daily News	4/5 stars
American Songwriter	4.5/5 stars
Slant Magazine	3.5/5 stars

Someday is the third solo album by Susanna Hoffs. Reviews were positive: "Working with Nashville musician Andrew Brassell and producer Mitchell Froom, Hoffs creates an intimate and sweet album that frames her tender vocals with subtle arrangements that trade the jangle of the Bangles for an autumnally rich chamber pop sound."

== Reception ==
The album received considerable critical acclaim. Allmusic stated that the album "ends up being some of the best music Hoffs has been associated with. Working with Nashville musician Andrew Brassell and producer Mitchell Froom, Hoffs creates an intimate and sweet album that frames her tender vocals with subtle arrangements that trade the jangle of the Bangles for an autumnally rich chamber pop sound...It's pretty rare that someone would make the best record of her career so far into it; Hoffs has done it, though, and Someday is an album perfect for not only her fans, but also fans of well-crafted, emotionally true adult pop."

Slant Magazine noted that "Susanna Hoffs’s affinity for the music of the ’60s has informed her work with the Bangles, her “Sid n Susie” collaborations with Matthew Sweet, and her sporadic solo career, but she's never recorded as note-perfect an homage to the lush pop of that era as she has on Someday. Hoffs is a classicist at heart, and, nearly 30 years into her career, she's never sounded as natural and at ease as she does here...above all else, the prevailing tone of Hoffs's work on Someday is one of sincerity, making the album a moving homage to the music she grew up with."

American Songwriter stated that Hoffs' "latest self-released effort marks a long overdue return to her own pop music career with triumphant results...Someday is the perfect soundtrack for a summertime rainy day that doesn’t overreach or become self-indulgent, but fulfills its goal of a delightfully enjoyable pop record. This is easily and undeniably Hoffs’ most definitive musical statement to date."

== Track listing ==
#	Title	Composers	Length
1.	"November Sun"	Gregg Arreguin/Susanna Hoffs/Daniel Schwartz	2:58
2.	"Always Enough"	Andrew Brassell/Susanna Hoffs	3:38
3.	"Picture Me"	Andrew Brassell/Susanna Hoffs	2:57
4.	"One Day"	Andrew Brassell/Susanna Hoffs	3:41
5.	"Holding My Breath"	Andrew Brassell/Susanna Hoffs	3:07
6.	"All I Need"	Andrew Brassell/Susanna Hoffs	2:32
7.	"Raining"	Andrew Brassell/Mike Campbell/Susanna Hoffs	3:09
8.	"Regret"	Andrew Brassell/Susanna Hoffs	2:33
9.	"This Is the Place"	Andrew Brassell/Susanna Hoffs	2:59
10.	"True"	Andrew Brassell/Susanna Hoffs	3:25

== Personnel ==
- Susanna Hoffs – vocals, harmony vocals, tambourine
- Andrew Brassell – acoustic guitars, electric guitars, marimba, harmony vocals
- Val McCallum – acoustic guitars (1–5, 7–10), electric guitars (1–5, 7–10)
- Pete Thomas – drums (1–3, 7, 8, 10), percussion (1–3, 7, 8, 10)
- Davey Faragher – electric bass (1–3, 7, 8, 10)
- Michael Urbano – drums (4, 5, 9), percussion (4, 5, 9)
- Bob Glaub – electric bass (4, 5, 9)
- Dan Higgins – clarinets, flutes, saxophones
- Hagai Izraeli – horns
- Chris Woods – viola, violin
- Adrienne Woods – cello
- Mitchell Froom – keyboards, orchestration

=== Production ===
- Mitchell Froom – producer
- David Boucher – recording, mixing
- Roger Seibel – mastering at SAE Mastering (Phoenix, Arizona)
- Andrew Kligier – art direction, graphic design
- Miranda Hoffs – art direction assistant
- Rebecca Wilson – cover photography
- Jonathon Kingsbury – inside photography
- Russell Carter Artist Management Ltd. – management
