= My Side of the Bed =

Single by Susanna Hoffs

from the album When You're a Boy
- Released: December 1990
- Genre: Pop
- Length: 3:27
- Label: Columbia
- Songwriters: Susanna Hoffs; Tom Kelly; Billy Steinberg
- Producer: David Kahne

Susanna Hoffs singles chronology
"My Side of the Bed" (1990)	"When You're a Boy" (1991)

Alternative cover
- 3" Japanese CD-single

"My Side of the Bed" is a song by American singer-songwriter Susanna Hoffs, released in December 1990 by Columbia Records as the lead single from her debut solo album, When You're a Boy (1991). It was written by Hoffs, Tom Kelly and Billy Steinberg, and produced by David Kahne. "My Side of the Bed" reached No. 30 on the US Billboard Hot 100, her highest-charting single.

== Charts ==
=== Weekly charts ===
Chart (1990–1991)	Peak position
Australia (ARIA)	54
Austria (Ö3 Austria Top 40)	20
Belgium (Ultratop Flanders)	33
Canada Top Singles (RPM)	11
Canada Adult Contemporary (RPM)	29
Europe (Eurochart Hot 100)	75
Europe Airplay (European Hit Radio)	1
Finland (Official Finnish Charts)	25
Germany (Official German Charts)	36
Luxembourg (Radio Luxembourg)	14
Netherlands (Single Top 100)	23
New Zealand (RIANZ)	33
Quebec (ADISQ)	15
UK Singles (OCC)	44
UK Airplay (Music Week)	8
US Billboard Hot 100	30
US Adult Contemporary (Billboard)	27
US Cash Box Top 100	26
US Radio & Records CHR Top 40	23

=== Year-end charts ===
Chart (1991)	Position
Canada Top Singles (RPM)	82
Europe (European Hit Radio)	30
