= Bones (band) =

American power pop band

- Origin: Redlands, California, United States
- Genres: Power pop, classic rock, folk rock, soul, rock and roll
- Years active: 1969–1973
- Labels: Signpost Records, MCA Records
- Past members: Danny Faragher; Jimmy Faragher; Greg Tornquist; Casey Cunningham; Patrick McClure
- Website: www.dannyfaragher.com/bio/bones/

Bones was an American power pop band that combined rock with soul and rhythm and blues, charting in 1972 with their cover of Huey "Piano" Smith's song, "Roberta". Bones was the continuation of the band Peppermint Trolley Company, which renamed itself and chose a new musical direction, after the group walked away from their recording contract with Acta Records in 1969.

Bones released two albums, one on Signpost Records and another on MCA Records, as well as releasing three singles. The original line-up included Jimmy Faragher (vocals, bass, guitar), Danny Faragher (vocals, keyboards, brass, harmonica), Casey Cunningham (drums) and Greg Tornquist (guitar, flute, harmonica) Patrick McClure (guitar, vocals) joined the band for the second album in 1973.

== History ==
In 1969, the Peppermint Trolley Company walked away from their contract for a variety of reasons, both financial and creative. They moved to Riverside, California and changed their name to "Bones". According to Danny Faragher, the name was chosen as it was the furthest thing away from the name Peppermint Trolley Company, derived from an Earl Stanley Gardner murder mystery novel.

After touring the fraternity circuit (UCLA, USC), band manager Steve Hauser, landed them an interview at two prominent Sunset Strip nightclubs, Gazzarri's and the Whisky a Go Go, with them ultimately signing up as Gazzarri's house band for a three-month run before later playing the Whisky a Go Go, as well as going on to play The Roxy. In July 1971, after playing the club circuit, including the Topanga Corral, Bones was signed to Signpost Records by Artie Mogul with Richard Perry as their producer. They went on to tour the Midwest, opening for Alice Cooper, Canned Heat and Little Richard

The band's self-titled album, Bones, was released in the spring of 1972. The album featured photography and artwork by the late comedian Phil Hartman. The single "Roberta", written by Huey "Piano" Smith, was released shortly after, charting at number 94 on the Billboard Hot 100. A second single, "Good Luck" was also released in 1973. The same year, Signpost Records owner Artie Mogul sold the company to MCA Records. The second album, Waitin' Here, was released in September 1973, produced by Vini Poncia. A single, "Undenied" was released shortly after. The album featured a more soul and R&B sound though was not pushed by the MCA label in the transitional confusion.

In October 1973, Bones disbanded. Brothers Danny and Jimmy Faragher went on to form the blue-eyed soul group, the Faragher Brothers.

== Members ==
- Jimmy Faragher – lead vocals, bass, occasional guitar (1969–1973)
- Danny Faragher – keyboards, lead vocals, harmonica (1969–1973)
- Patrick McClure – guitar, backing vocals, occasional lead vocals (1972–1973; died 2014)
- Greg Tornquist – guitar, backing vocals (1969–1973)
- Casey Cunningham – drums (1969–1973)

Timeline

== Album discography ==
- 1972: Bones (album)
- 1973: Waitin' Here
