= The Delivery Man (album) =

Studio album by Elvis Costello and The Imposters
- Released: 21 September 2004
- Studio: Sweet Tea (Oxford, Mississippi)
- Genres: Alternative rock; alternative country; roots rock
- Length: 53:20
- Label: Lost Highway
- Producers: Elvis Costello; Dennis Herring

Elvis Costello and The Imposters chronology
Cruel Smile (2002)	The Delivery Man (2004)	Momofuku (2008)

Elvis Costello chronology
Il Sogno (2004)	The Delivery Man (2004)	My Flame Burns Blue (2006)

Singles from The Delivery Man
- 1. "Monkey to Man" Released: 2004

Professional ratings
Aggregate scores
Source	Rating
Metacritic	71/100
Review scores
Source	Rating
AllMusic	4/5 stars
Blender	4/5 stars
Entertainment Weekly	B+
The Guardian	4/5 stars
Los Angeles Times	3/4 stars
Mojo	5/5 stars
Pitchfork	6.8/10
Q	3/5 stars
Rolling Stone	4/5 stars
Uncut	3/5 stars

The Delivery Man is the 21st studio album by Elvis Costello, released on 21 September 2004 through Lost Highway Records. It was recorded with the Imposters at Sweet Tea Studio in Oxford, Mississippi. It peaked at No. 40 on the Billboard 200.

== Content ==
The album had its genesis in a conceptual story apparently written for Johnny Cash. Costello himself states:

"The Delivery Man started out as a story about the impact on three woman's lives of a man with a hidden past. The story took the song "Hidden Shame" as its unsung prelude. Parts of the narrative ended up being displaced from the final album by more urgent songs taken from the news headlines. One of the songs moved aside was to find an ideal home on Secret, Profane & Sugarcane."

The album features guest vocals by Lucinda Williams and Emmylou Harris. "Monkey to Man" derived from a 1950s rhythm and blues hit "The Monkey" by Dave Bartholomew, and "The Judgment", a song written by Costello and Cait O'Riordan (his wife 1986-2002) which had been previously recorded by Solomon Burke on his 2002 release Don't Give Up on Me. The vinyl and United Kingdom compact disc pressings of the album included an additional track, "She's Pulling Out the Pin". The album was issued the same day as Il Sogno.

Shortly after its release, Lost Highway issued a deluxe edition of the album, including a bonus disc containing seven tracks from the Clarksdale Sessions ten-inch vinyl record, a collection of songs recorded live at Delta Recording in Clarksdale, Mississippi. The Clarksdale Sessions, subtitled "Delivery Man Companion", contained new versions of tracks from the proper album as well as an unreleased Costello original "In Another Room", and covers of the Bartholomew original "The Monkey" and "Dark End of the Street". Tom Waits has named it one of his favourite albums.

== Track listing ==
All tracks are written by Elvis Costello unless otherwise indicated.

No.	Title	Writer(s)	Length
1.	"Button My Lip"		4:54
2.	"Country Darkness"		3:57
3.	"There's a Story in Your Voice"		3:43
4.	"Either Side of the Same Town"	Costello, Jerry Ragovoy	3:59
5.	"Bedlam"		4:48
6.	"The Delivery Man"		4:38
7.	"Monkey to Man"		4:28
8.	"Nothing Clings Like Ivy"		4:17
9.	"The Name of This Thing Is Not Love"		2:50
10.	"Heart Shaped Bruise"		4:07
11.	"Needle Time"		5:05
12.	"The Judgement"	Costello, Cait O'Riordan	3:58
13.	"The Scarlet Tide"	Costello, T-Bone Burnett	2:25
Total length:			53:20

Vinyl pressings, UK CD and the deluxe edition CD include "She's Pulling Out the Pin" (3:22) as an additional track between "Heart Shaped Bruise" and "Needle Time".

Delta-Verité – The Clarksdale Sessions (Deluxe edition bonus disc)
No.	Title	Writer(s)	Length
1.	"The Monkey"	Dave Bartholomew, Pearl King	2:34
2.	"Country Darkness"		4:21
3.	"Needle Time"		5:13
4.	"The Scarlet Tide"	Costello, Burnett	2:22
5.	"In Another Room"		4:25
6.	"The Delivery Man"		4:57
7.	"The Dark End of the Street"	Dan Penn, Chips Moman	3:06

== Personnel ==
- Elvis Costello – vocals, guitars, piano, glockenspiel, tambourine, bass, ukulele
- Steve Nieve – organ, piano, accordion, harmonium, Hammond organ, theremin, melodica, omnichord
- Davey Faragher – bass, vocals
- Pete Thomas – drums
- Emmylou Harris – vocals (on "Nothing Clings Like Ivy", "Heart Shaped Bruise", and "The Scarlet Tide")
- John McFee – pedal steel guitar (on "Country Darkness" and "Heart Shaped Bruise")
- Lucinda Williams – vocal (on "There's a Story in Your Voice")

== Charts ==
Chart (2004)	Peak position
Australian Albums (ARIA)	89
Belgian Albums (Ultratop Flanders)	31
Dutch Albums (Album Top 100)	65
German Albums (Offizielle Top 100)	100
Italian Albums (FIMI)	46
Norwegian Albums (VG-lista)	34
Swedish Albums (Sverigetopplistan)	58
UK Albums (Official Charts)	73
US Billboard 200	40
