= When I Was Cruel =

Studio album by Elvis Costello
- Released: 23 April 2002
- Recorded: 2001–2002
- Studio: Windmill Lane Studios
- Genre: Alternative rock
- Length: 62:53
- Labels: Island; Mercury
- Producers: Elvis Costello; Ciaran Cahill; Leo Pearson; Kieran Lynch

Elvis Costello chronology
For the Stars (2001)	When I Was Cruel (2002)	Cruel Smile (2002)

Singles from When I Was Cruel
- 1. "Tear Off Your Own Head (It's a Doll Revolution)" Released: 2002; 2. "45" Released: 2002

Professional ratings
Aggregate scores
Source	Rating
Metacritic	76/100
Review scores
Source	Rating
AllMusic	3/5 stars
Blender	4/5 stars
Entertainment Weekly	A
The Guardian	4/5 stars
Los Angeles Times	4/4 stars
NME	6/10
Pitchfork	8.0/10
Q	3/5 stars
Rolling Stone	4/5 stars
Spin	7/10

When I Was Cruel is the 19th studio album by English singer-songwriter Elvis Costello, released in the US by Island Records on 23 April 2002. Although formally credited as solo Costello album, this was the first album to feature his new band, the Imposters featuring Steve Nieve on keyboards, Davey Faragher on bass guitar and Pete Thomas on drums. Their only difference from his previous band, the Attractions (active 1977–87 and 1994–96), was Faragher replacing Bruce Thomas, with whom Costello had feuded.

The album was released with different track listings for various international versions. Costello wrote two songs for the film Prison Song - "Soul for Hire", which was included with all versions of the album, and "Oh Well", which was included only in the track listing in Europe and Japan. Japan also featured as a bonus track a cover of Charlie Chaplin's song "Smile", which was later released as a single. When the album was released, promotional materials billed it as Costello's "FIRST LOUD ALBUM SINCE 199?".

The song "45" is about being 45 years old, Costello's age when he wrote it. The song also features Costello's penchant for multiple meanings, referencing the year 1945, .45 caliber pistols, and 45 rpm records. The idea and title of "Tear Off Your Own Head (It's A Doll Revolution)" came from a set of Engrish-laden dolls in Japan. It appears in the 2003 film The Shape of Things. The Bangles covered it as the title track on their 2003 album, Doll Revolution.

Critical reception was mostly positive, citing strong songwriting and performances. When I was Cruel was also a moderate commercial success.

== Track listing ==
All tracks are written by Elvis Costello.

No.	Title	Length
1.	"45"	3:33
2.	"Spooky Girlfriend"	4:22
3.	"Tear Off Your Own Head (It's a Doll Revolution)"	3:31
4.	"When I Was Cruel No. 2" (featuring a sample from Mina's "Un bacio è troppo poco")	7:06
5.	"Soul for Hire"	3:55
6.	"15 Petals"	4:01
7.	"Tart"	4:03
8.	"Dust 2..."	3:21
9.	"Dissolve"	2:22
10.	"Alibi"	6:42
11.	"...Dust"	3:03
12.	"Daddy Can I Turn This?"	3:41
13.	"My Little Blue Window"	3:10
14.	"Episode of Blonde"	5:01
15.	"Radio Silence"	4:58
Total length:		62:53

The European and Japanese editions add "Oh Well" as track 14, between "My Little Blue Window" and "Episode of Blonde." The Japanese edition also closes with "Smile" as an additional 17th track.

== Personnel ==
- Elvis Costello – vocals, guitars, horn arrangements on 6, 11, 15, melodica, cymbal, bass, piano, harmonica
- Steve Nieve – organ, pianet, piano, vibraphone, melodica, filters
- Davey Faragher – bass, handclaps
- Pete Thomas – drums, handclaps, percussion, shaker, tambourine

=== Additional personnel ===
- Steven Kennedy – backing vocals on 1, 12, 13
- Leo Pearson – electric tabla on 3, rhythm processor on 5, 8, tambourine, mixing
- Bill Ware – vibraphone on 4
- Ku-umba Frank Lacy – trumpet on 6, flugelhorn on 11, 15
- Curtis Fowlkes – trombone on 6, 11, 15
- Jay Rodriguez – tenor saxophone on 6, 11, 15
- Roy Nathanson – alto saxophone on 6, 11, 15

== Charts ==
Chart (2002)	Peak position
US Billboard 200	20

=== Year-end charts ===
Chart (2002)	Position
Canadian Alternative Albums (Nielsen SoundScan)	152
