= Ming Tea =

American band

- Members: Mike Myers; Susanna Hoffs; Matthew Sweet; Stuart Johnson; Christopher Ward

Ming Tea is a faux retro-mod band consisting of Mike Myers, Susanna Hoffs, Matthew Sweet, Stuart Johnson, and Christopher Ward. The band was formed by Myers after he appeared on Saturday Night Live in the 1990s. Ming Tea has also appeared in the Austin Powers film series, with the members performing under pseudonyms.

== History ==
Myers formed the band with Sweet and Hoffs following his Saturday Night Live stint in the early 1990s. The members all adopted 1960s personae and performed under pseudonyms, with Myers as lead singer under the name "Austin Powers". Myers's then-wife Robin Ruzan encouraged him to write a film based on the Powers character. He subsequently wrote Austin Powers: International Man of Mystery, which was directed by Hoffs's husband Jay Roach; Roach would also direct the film's sequels.

Ming Tea recorded the song "BBC" for the end credits and soundtrack of International Man of Mystery, released in 1997. The band appeared in and performed the "psychedelic scene breaks" for the film series' second installment, Austin Powers: The Spy Who Shagged Me. The song "Daddy Wasn't There" appears in the 2002 sequel Goldmember. Both songs appear on their respective movie soundtracks. A promotional music video for "Daddy Wasn't There" was broadcast on music video channels.

The band's aesthetics, costumes and instruments were different in each film. Ming Tea originally appeared in mid-1960s mod fashions, using Fender and Rickenbacker guitars and a Gibson bass for "BBC". The costumes changed to a colorful late-1960s motif and the instruments were matching Musicvox Spaceranger guitars and bass for the third film, which featured "Daddy Wasn’t There". The drum set remained the same in each film, a rare British-made Arbiter set with a custom-art Ming Tea band logo on the bass drum head.

After collaborating in Ming Tea, Sweet and Hoffs continued to work together, recording three albums covering some of their favorite songs from the 1960s, 1970s and 1980s: Under the Covers, Vol. 1 in 2006, Under the Covers, Vol. 2 in 2009, and Under the Covers, Vol. 3 in 2013. In this format, they are known by the pseudonyms Sid and Susie. Myers has occasionally joined them onstage to perform "BBC", including at a 2006 show at Bowery Ballroom in New York City.

In a reply to a fan's question about Ming Tea on the Bangles Fan Mail page, Susanna Hoffs stated that "We got the name Ming Tea from a very obscure 1960s Italian movie starring Ursula Andress." The film in question is The 10th Victim, which features the fictional Ming Tea Company.

== Members ==
- Mike Myers (as Austin Powers) – lead vocals, guitar
- Susanna Hoffs (as Gillian Shagwell) – lead guitar and backing vocals
- Matthew Sweet (as Sid Belvedere) – bass and backing vocals
- Stuart Johnson (as Manny Stixman) – drums and backing vocals
- Christopher Ward (as Trevor Aigburth) – rhythm guitar and backing vocals
