= Peppermint Trolley Company =

American sunshine pop band

The Peppermint Trolley Company
- Also known as: The Mark Five (Mark V) (1965–1966)
- Origin: Redlands, California, United States
- Genres: Sunshine pop
- Years active: 1965–1969
- Labels: Acta, Valiant, Cherry Red
- Spinoffs: Bones
- Past members: Jimmy Faragher; Danny Faragher; Brad Madson; Dick Owens; Dave Kelliher; Steve Hauser; Patrick McClure; Casey Cunningham; Greg Tornquist
- Website: www.dannyfaragher.com/bio/the-peppermint-trolley-company/

The Peppermint Trolley Company was an American sunshine pop band known for their 1968 single "Baby You Come Rollin' 'Cross My Mind", their performances on Mannix and The Beverly Hillbillies, and their arrangement and performance of original theme song for The Brady Bunch.

The Peppermint Trolley Company released one album and five singles on the Acta label, a subsidiary of Dot Records. The original line-up included Jimmy Faragher (vocals, bass, guitar), Danny Faragher (vocals, keyboards), Casey Cunningham (drums) and Patrick McClure (guitar, vocals). McClure was replaced by Greg Tornquist. In 1969, Jimmy and Danny Faragher, Cunningham and Tornquist left their recording contract with Acta to form the rock/soul group Bones.

== History ==
The Peppermint Trolley Company was formed in Redlands, California in 1966, when the band the Mark V, consisting of members Danny Faragher, Jimmy Faragher, Steve Hauser, Dave Kelliher, Brad Madson and Dick Owens, teamed with producer Dan Dalton, who urged the band to change its name. The Peppermint Trolley Company's name was proposed by Jimmy Faragher and chosen by a committee of the Mark V band members. The single "Lollipop Train" was released (with B-side "Bored to Tears") on Valiant Records.

In January 1967, the band broke up, leaving brothers Danny and Jimmy Faragher as the sole members. Recording continued, and a deal was signed with Acta Records. The single "She's the Kind of Girl" was released in Spring 1967. Casey Cunningham (drums) joined the band that June. The single "It's a Lazy Summer Day" was released the same month. Patrick McClure (guitar) joined shortly thereafter.

In Fall 1967, Patrick McClure left the band and was replaced by Greg Tornquist (guitar). In November, recording began for "Baby You Come Rollin' Across My Mind", which was released in January 1968 and peaked at No. 59 on the Billboard 100 chart that summer, and No. 38 in Canada.

The single "Trust", written by Paul Williams and Roger Nichols, was released in September 1968, and the self-titled album The Peppermint Trolley Company was released the same month. While the album failed to chart, according to the liner notes of the 2009 reissue, "it sold well in many markets and can be easily found 40 years later, implying good distribution and multiple pressings."

In January 1969, The Peppermint Trolley Company left Acta Records and changed its name to Bones, recording two albums for Signpost Records and MCA.

== Television appearances ==
The Peppermint Trolley Company made many notable television appearances, including Mannix, The Beverly Hillbillies, Happening '68 and Upbeat.

== The Brady Bunch theme song ==
The Peppermint Trolley Company is credited with arranging and singing The Brady Bunch theme song for the show's pilot. After the band left Acta Records, the vocals were rerecorded and sung by studio singers Paul Parrish, John Beland and Lois Fletcher.

== 2009 re-issue ==
In 2009, the Peppermint Trolley Company's self-titled album was re-released on Now Sounds, a division of Cherry Red. Produced for reissue by Steve Stanley, Beautiful Sun contained all 11 of the original album's tracks as well as 16 bonus tracks, including many B-sides and singles from The Mark V.

== Members ==
Final lineup

- Jimmy Faragher – lead vocals, bass, occasional guitar (1965–1968)
- Danny Faragher – keyboards, flute (1967–1968), lead vocals, harmonica (1965–1968); trombone (1965–1966)
- Greg Tornquist – guitar, backing vocals (1967–1968)
- Casey Cunningham – drums (1967–1968)

Previous members

- Brad Madson – keyboards (1965–1967)
- Dick Owens – drums (1965–1967)
- Dave Kelliher – trumpet, guitar, backing vocals (1965–1967)
- Steve Hauser – saxophone, flute, clarinet, backing vocals (1965–1967)
- Patrick McClure – guitar, backing vocals (1967; died 2014)

Timeline

== Discography ==
=== Studio albums ===
- 1968: The Peppermint Trolley Company

=== Compilations ===
- 2009: Beautiful Sun (self-titled 1968 album plus earlier singles and B-sides)
