= Davey Faragher =

American musician (born 1957)

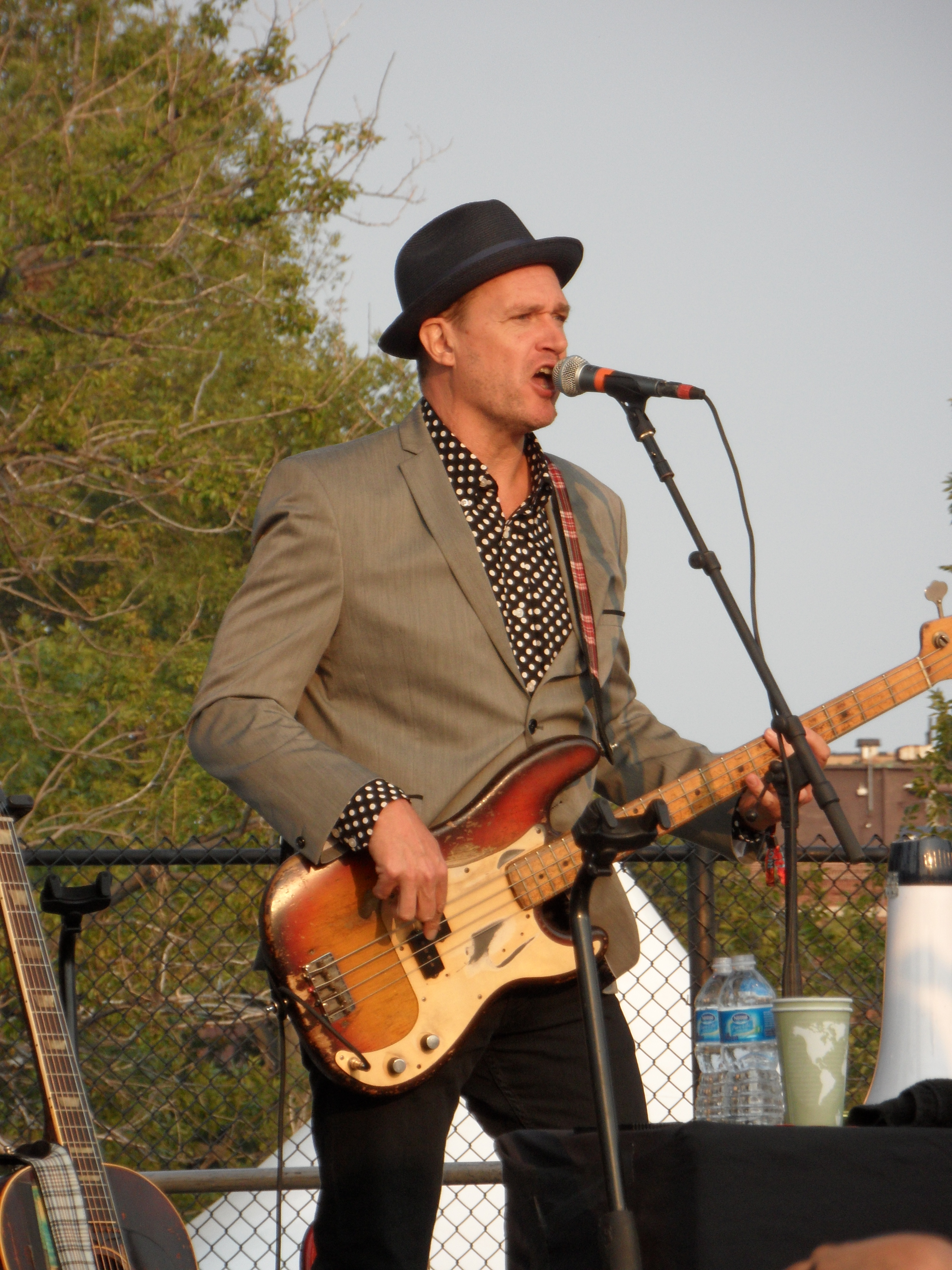
- Faragher performing in 2012

Background information
- Born: David Allen Faragher; August 18, 1957 (age 69)
- Origin: Redlands, California
- Genre: Pop punk
- Occupation: Musician
- Instruments: Bass, Vocals
- Years active: 1977–present
- Labels: Virgin, Cooking Vinyl, Savoy / 429, Island, Lost Highway, Verve Forecast, Hear Music

David Allen "Davey" Faragher (born August 18, 1957) is an American bass guitarist from Redlands, California. Faragher is best known as a founding member of the rock band Cracker, and for his subsequent work with John Hiatt's band and the Imposters, the backing band for Elvis Costello, with whom he has played since 2001. In 2015, Faragher joined Richard Thompson's Electric Trio for Thompson's Still album and US tour. Faragher also works as a session musician.

== Biography ==
In the mid-to-late 1970s, Faragher recorded three albums with his brothers Danny Faragher, Jimmy, and Tommy Faragher as The Faragher Brothers. Later, the band was renamed The Faraghers for a fourth album, featuring fifth brother Marty and sister Pammy. From there, he became a Los Angeles-based session bass player and was featured in Bass Player magazine in February 2001.

He also plays club gigs in Los Angeles with fellow Imposter member Pete Thomas and guitarist Val McCallum under the band name Jackshit. The trio was featured in the Spring 2002 issue of Grindstone Magazine.

== Cracker ==
Faragher was a founding member of the band Cracker in the early 1990s. Faragher shared a writing credit on the band's 1993 hit "Low," among others, and was given the cover feature story of BAM magazine in July 1992. During his time in Cracker, Faragher would perform in a dress. When the band performed on Late Night with David Letterman, the show's host made a joke about it.

== John Hiatt collaboration ==
After his departure from Cracker late in 1993, Faragher became the bass player in John Hiatt's band through the late 1990s. He was credited as associate producer for John Hiatt's 1995 Walk On album, and producer (with Hiatt) on his 1997 Little Head album.

== Session work ==
Faragher has worked much of his career as a session musician, recording with the Monkees (on their 1986 reunion album Pool It!), David Crosby, John Phillips, Wanda Jackson, Dusty Springfield, Red House Painters, Bonnie Raitt, Sheryl Crow, Susanna Hoffs, Vonda Shepard, Joan Osborne, Ronnie Montrose, Mark Kozelek, Shivaree, Guster, the Finn Brothers, Camper Van Beethoven, Chantal Kreviazuk, Allen Toussaint, Dr. Zwig, Buddy Guy, Willy DeVille and the Ditty Bops. He is thanked in the liner-notes for Counting Crows' hit single "Hanginaround" on This Desert Life (produced by former Cracker bandmate David Lowery).

In February 2007, he played the part of the bass player in Scrantonicity, the band featured in The Office episode "Phyllis' Wedding." In January 2008, it was reported in Billboard that a new supergroup tentatively called the Scrolls, (now officially Works Progress Administration (W.P.A.)) had formed. The octet is composed of Faragher, Sean Watkins (guitar), his sister Sara Watkins (fiddle), Glen Phillips (guitar, vocals), Benmont Tench (piano), Luke Bulla (fiddle), Greg Leisz (various), and Pete Thomas (drums). The group released their debut album in late 2009. In 2010, Faragher played as a session bassist for The Union, a Grammy Award-nominated collaboration by Elton John and Leon Russell.

== Collaborations ==
With Jann Arden

- Blood Red Cherry (Universal Music, 2000)

With Tracy Bonham

- Blink the Brightest (Zoe Records, 2005)

With Jonatha Brooke

- Steady Pull (Bad Dog Records, 2001)

With Jackson Browne

- Downhill from Everywhere (Inside Records, 2021)

With Cock Robin

- First Love / Last Rites (CBS Records, 1989)

With Sharon Corr

- The Same Sun (BobbyJean, 2013)

With Elvis Costello

- When I Was Cruel (Mercury Records, 2002)
- North (Deutsche Grammophon, 2003)
- The Delivery Man (Lost Highway Records, 2004)
- The River in Reverse (Verve Forecast, 2006)
- Momofuku (Lost Highway Records, 2008)
- National Ransom (Universal Records, 2010)
- Look Now (Concord Records, 2018)
- The Boy Named If (Capitol Records, 2022)

With Peter Criss

- Peter Criss (Casablanca Records, 1978)
- Let Me Rock You (Casablanca Records, 1982)

With A. J. Croce

- Adrian James Croce (Seedling Records, 2004)
- Cage of Muses (Seedling Records, 2009)

With Sheryl Crow

- Sheryl Crow (A&M Records, 1996)
- C'mon, C'mon (A&M Records, 2002)

With E. G. Daily

- Lace Around the Wound (A&M Records, 1989)

With Ilse DeLange

- Next to Me (Universal Music, 2010)

With Willy DeVille

- Loup Garou (EastWest Records, 1995)
- Pistola (Eagle Records, 2008)

With Kat Edmonson

- The Big Picture (Sony, 2014)

With Mikky Ekko

- Time (RCA Records, 2015)

With Jeffrey Gaines

- Alright (Omnivore Recordings, 2018)

With Michael Grimm

- Michael Grimm (Epic Records, 2011)

With Susanna Hoffs

- Susanna Hoffs (London Records, 1996)
- Someday (Baroque Folk, 2012)

With Greg Holden

- I Don't Believe You (Falling Art Recordings, 2011)

With Missy Higgins

- On a Clear Night (Reprise Records, 2007)

With La Toya Jackson

- Imagination (Epic Records, 1986)

With Elton John and Leon Russell

- The Union (Mercury Records, 2010)

With Chantal Kreviazuk

- Under These Rocks and Stones (Columbia Records, 1996)

With Jenny Lewis

- Acid Tongue (Warner Bros. Records, 2008)

With Shelby Lynne and Allison Moorer

- Not Dark Yet (Thirty Tigers, 2017)

With The Monkees

- Pool It! (Rhino Records, 1987)

With Mandy Moore

- Silver Landings (Verve Records, 2020)
- In Real Life (Verve Records, 2022)

With Olivia Newton-John

- The Rumour (MCA Records, 1988)

With Heather Nova

- South (V2 Records, 2001)

With Chuck Prophet

- Feast of Hearts (China Records, 1995)
- Age of Miracles (New West Records, 2004)

With Daniel Powter

- Daniel Powter (Warner Bros. Records, 2005)

With James Reyne

- James Reyne (Capitol Records, 1987)

With Jessica Riddle

- Key of a Minor (Hollywood Records, 2000)

With Andrew Ridgeley

- Son of Albert (Columbia Records, 1990)

With Katey Sagal

- Room (Valley Entertainment, 2004)
- Covered (E1 Music, 2013)

With Alejandro Sanz

- Sirope (Universal, 2015)

With Ron Sexsmith

- Time Being (V2 Records, 2006)
- Forever Endeavour (Cooking Vinyl, 2013)

With Vonda Shepard

- By 7:30 (Jacket Records, 1999)
- Chinatown (Edel Records, 2002)

With Chris Shiflett

- Chris Shiflett & the Dead Peasants (RCA Records, 2010)

With Josh Smith

- Burn to Grow (Vizztone, 2018)

With Dusty Springfield

- White Heat (Casablanca Records, 1982)

With Curtis Stigers

- Brighter Days (Columbia Records, 1999)

With Peter Stuart

- Propeller (Vanguard Records, 2002)

With The Temptations

- All the Time (UMe, 2018)

With Teddy Thompson

- Little Windows (Cooking Vinyl Records, 2016)

With Rufus Wainwright

- Unfollow the Rules (BMG, 2020)

With Robbie Williams

- Intensive Care (Chrysalis Records, 2005)

With Paul Young

- The Crossing (Columbia Records, 1993)
