= Lou Reed discography =

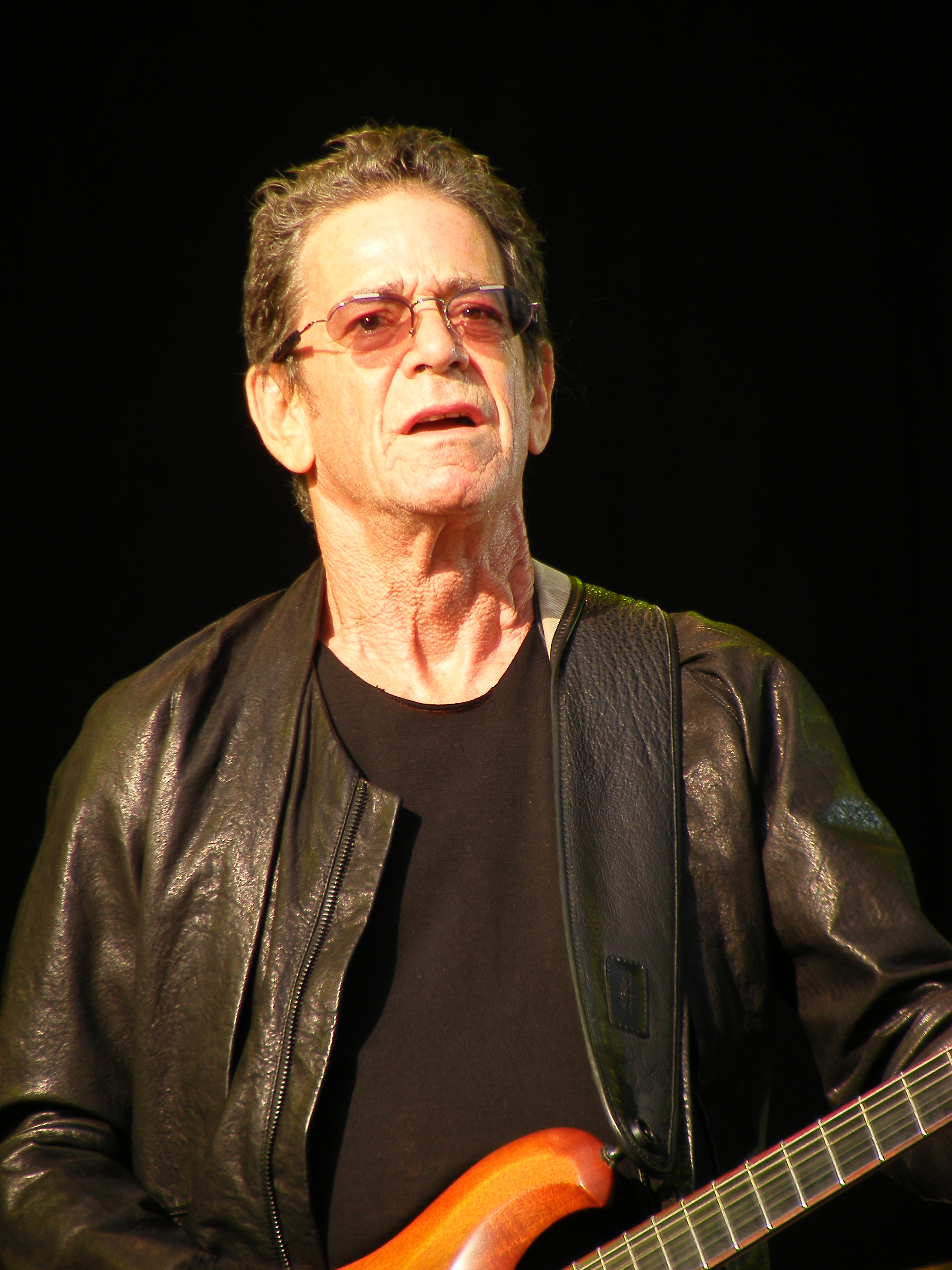
- Reed performing in 2011
- Studio albums: 22
- Extended plays: 1
- Live albums: 18
- Compilation albums: 19
- Tribute albums: 8
- Singles: 52
- Video albums: 16
- Music videos: 17
- Box sets: 12

American rock musician Lou Reed released 22 studio albums, 19 compilation albums, 18 live albums, 16 video albums, 52 singles, 1 extended play, 17 music videos, and 12 box-sets.

== Albums ==
=== Studio albums ===
Year	Title	Release date	Label	Peak chart positions										Certifications (sales thresholds)
Year	Title	Release date	Label	US	AUS	CAN	FRA	GER	NZ	NLD	NOR	SWE	UK	Certifications (sales thresholds)
1972	Lou Reed	May 1972	RCA	189	—	—	—	—	—	—	—	—	—	
1972	Transformer	November 1972	RCA	29	12	12	—	—	—	6	—	—	13	AUS: Gold; BPI: Platinum
1973	Berlin	October 1973	RCA	98	59	51	—	—	—	—	—	—	7	BPI: Silver
1974	Sally Can't Dance	September 1974	RCA	10	14	22	—	—	—	15	—	—	—	
1975	Metal Machine Music	July 1975	RCA	—	—	—	—	—	—	—	—	—	—	
1976	Coney Island Baby	January 1976	RCA	41	25	—	—	—	16	4	—	23	52	
1976	Rock and Roll Heart	November 1976	Arista	64	68	91	—	—	—	19	—	40	—	
1978	Street Hassle	February 1978	Arista	89	24	—	—	—	9	—	—	—	—	
1979	The Bells	May 1979	Arista	130	58	—	—	—	13	—	—	44	—	
1980	Growing Up in Public	April 1980	Arista	158	—	—	—	—	27	—	—	35	—	
1982	The Blue Mask	February 1982	RCA	169	—	—	—	52	35	28	—	17	—	
1983	Legendary Hearts	March 1983	RCA	159	—	—	—	—	—	—	—	36	—	
1984	New Sensations	April 1984	RCA	56	56	96	—	—	25	—	—	30	92	
1986	Mistrial	April 1986	RCA	47	47	54	—	—	31	—	—	14	69	
1989	New York	January 1989	Sire	40	25	44	—	19	17	11	12	9	14	RIAA: Gold; ARIA: Platinum; BPI: Gold
1990	Songs for Drella (with John Cale)	April 1990	Sire	103	100	—	—	28	42	14	—	43	22	
1992	Magic and Loss	January 1992	Sire	80	56	56	—	17	20	11	10	9	6	
1996	Set the Twilight Reeling	February 1996	Warner Bros.	110	109	46	—	18	—	26	17	23	26	
2000	Ecstasy	April 2000	Reprise Records	183	121	—	48	24	—	68	20	—	54	
2003	The Raven	January 2003	Sire	—	—	—	60	45	—	50	—	—	—	
2007	Hudson River Wind Meditations	April 2007	Sounds True	—	—	—	—	—	—	—	—	—	—	
2011	Lulu (with Metallica)	October 2011	Warner Bros.	36	33	25	23	6	12	17	11	9	36	
"—" denotes albums that did not chart, or albums not released in a particular territory.

=== Live albums ===
Year	Title	Release date	Label	Peak chart positions								Certifications (sales thresholds)
Year	Title	Release date	Label	US	AUS	CAN	FRA	GER	NZ	NLD	UK	Certifications (sales thresholds)
1974	Rock 'n' Roll Animal	February 1974	RCA	45	20	55	—	—	—	—	26	RIAA: Gold
1975	Lou Reed Live	March 1975	RCA	62	42	—	—	—	15	4	—	
1978	Live: Take No Prisoners	November 1978	Arista	—	—	—	—	—	10	—	—	
1984	Live in Italy	January 1984	RCA	—	—	—	—	—	—	—	—	
1996	Live in Concert (reissue of Live in Italy)	1996	RCA	—	—	—	—	—	—	—	—	
1998	Perfect Night: Live in London	April 1998	Sire	—	—	—	56	98	—	197	—	
2001	American Poet	June 2001	Pilot	—	—	—	—	—	—	—	—	
2004	Animal Serenade	March 2004	Reprise	—	—	—	157	—	—	—	—	
2004	Le Bataclan '72: with John Cale and Nico	October 2004	Dynamic	—	—	—	—	—	—	—	—	
2007	Metal Machine Music: with Zeitkratzer	September 4, 2007	Asphodel	—	—	—	—	—	—	—	—	
2008	The Stone: Issue Three: with John Zorn and Laurie Anderson	April 2008	Tzadik	—	—	—	—	—	—	—	—	
2008	Berlin: Live at St. Ann's Warehouse	November 2008	Matador	—	—	—	144	—	—	—	—	
2008	The Creation of the Universe	December 2008	Best Seat in the House Productions	—	—	—	—	—	—	—	—	
2014	Thinking of Another Place	March 2014	Easy Action	—	—	—	—	—	—	—	—	
2016	Waltzing Matilda (Love Has Gone Away)	2016	Easy Action	—	—	—	—	—	—	—	—	
2016	Alice Tully Hall	2016	Easy Action	—	—	—	—	—	—	—	—	
2017	In Their Own Words: with Kris Kristofferson and Vin Scelsa	September 15, 2017	The Bottom Line	—	—	—	—	—	—	—	—	
2020	When Your Heart Is Made Out of Ice	May 2020	Easy Action	—	—	—	—	—	—	—	—	
2020	Live at Alice Tully Hall (January 27, 1973 - 2nd Show)	November 27, 2020	RCA Victor/Legacy/Sony	—	—	—	—	—	—	—		
2025	Paris '74	December 17, 2025	Bandit	—	—	—	—	—	—	—	—	
"—" denotes albums that did not chart, or albums not released in a particular territory.

=== Compilation albums ===
Year	Title	Release date	Label	Peak chart positions							Certifications (sales thresholds)
Year	Title	Release date	Label	US	AUS	NZ	NLD	NOR	SWE	UK	Certifications (sales thresholds)
1977	Walk on the Wild Side: The Best of Lou Reed	April 1977	RCA	156	160	—	—	—	—	—	
1980	Rock and Roll Diary: 1967–1980	December 1980	Arista	178	—	—	—	—	—	—	
1985	City Lights	1985	Arista	—	—	—	—	—	—	—	
1989	Retro	1989, 1998	RCA	—	125	33	—	—	—	29	ARIA: Gold; BPI: Silver
1992	Between Thought and Expression: The Lou Reed Anthology	1992	RCA	—	165	—	—	—	—	—	
1992	Walk on the Wild Side & Other Hits	March 1992	RCA	—	—	—	—	—	—	—	
1995	The Best of Lou Reed & The Velvet Underground	1995	Global TV	—	—	—	—	—	—	56	BPI: Gold
1996	Different Times: Lou Reed in the '70s	May 1996	RCA	—	—	—	—	—	—	—	
1997	Perfect Day	October 1997	RCA	—	—	—	—	—	—	—	
1999	The Definitive Collection	August 1999	Arista	—	—	—	—	—	—	—	
1999	The Very Best of Lou Reed	1999	Camden Deluxe	—	—	—	—	19	—	94	BPI: Silver
2002	Legendary Lou Reed	July 2002	RCA/BMG	—	—	—	—	—	—	—	
2003	NYC Man (The Ultimate Collection 1967–2003)	June 2003	RCA/BMG	—	195	31	91	—	42	31	
2004	NYC Man: Greatest Hits	August 2004	RCA/BMG	—	—	—	—	—	—	43	
2008	Playlist: The Very Best of Lou Reed	July 2008	Legacy	—	—	—	—	—	—	—	
2011	The Essential Lou Reed	September 13, 2011	RCA	155	—	—	—	—	—	—	
2021	I'm So Free: The 1971 RCA Demos	December 24, 2021	RCA	—	—	—	—	—	—	—	
2022	Words & Music, May 1965	September 16, 2022	Light in the Attic	—	—	—	—	—	—	—	
2024	Why Don’t You Smile Now: Lou Reed at Pickwick Records 1964-65	October 18, 2024	Light in the Attic	—	—	—	—	—	—	—	
"—" denotes albums that did not chart, or albums not released in a particular territory.

=== Box sets ===
Year	Title	Release date	Label	Format	Content
1990	Songs for Drella Limited Edition	May 1990 (Germany)	Sire/Warner Reprise Video	CD+VHS	LP-size box with video, deluxe digipack velvet-cover CD and liner notes with Factory-era photographs, German-translated lyrics and poster of Andy Warhol
1992	Between Thought and Expression: The Lou Reed Anthology	April 14, 1992	RCA	3xCD/cassette	Hits, highlights, b-sides and previously unreleased material from 1972-1988 with a 48-page book, also available on streaming
2008	Original Album Classics	2008 (Europe)	RCA/Legacy/Sony	5xCD	5 albums from 1972-1976
2009	Original Album Classics	September 25, 2009	RCA/Legacy/Sony	5xCD	5 albums from 1982-1986
2010	Classic Albums: Transformer / Live at Montreux 2000	2010 (DVD) / 2014 (Blu-ray)	Eagle Vision	2xDVD / 1 Blu-ray	2 videos from 2001-2005
2011	Original Album Classics	October 7, 2011	RCA/Legacy/Sony	5xCD	5 albums from 1974-1980
2013	Original Album Series	February 11, 2013	Rhino/Sire/Warner	5xCD	5 albums from 1989-2000
2015	The Sire Years: The Complete Albums Box	October 30, 2015	Sire/Warner Bros.	10xCD	8 albums from 1989-2004, also available on streaming
2016	The RCA & Arista Album Collection	October 7, 2016	RCA/Arista/Legacy/Sony Music	17xCD	16 albums from 1972-1986, 80-page book, 5 prints and poster
2016	The RCA & Arista Vinyl Collection Vol. 1	October 7, 2016	RCA/Arista/Legacy/Sony Music	6xLP	6 albums from 1972-1982, 32-page book, booklets and poster
2020	New York: Limited Deluxe Edition	September 25, 2020	Sire/Rhino/Warner Bros.	2xLP+3xCD+DVD+cassette	Original album remastered, demos, singles, live audio and video, also available on streaming
2022	Words & Music, May 1965: Deluxe Edition	October 6, 2022	Light in the Attic	2xLP+7"+CD	Lou Reed Archive Series limited release of 7,500 copies with die-cut jacket, 28-page book, letter, previously unreleased demos and also available on streaming

== Extended plays ==
Year	Title	Release date	Label	Album
2022	Gee Whiz (1958-1964)	October 21, 2022	Light in the Attic	Words & Music, 1965 (Ltd. Deluxe Ed.)

== Singles ==
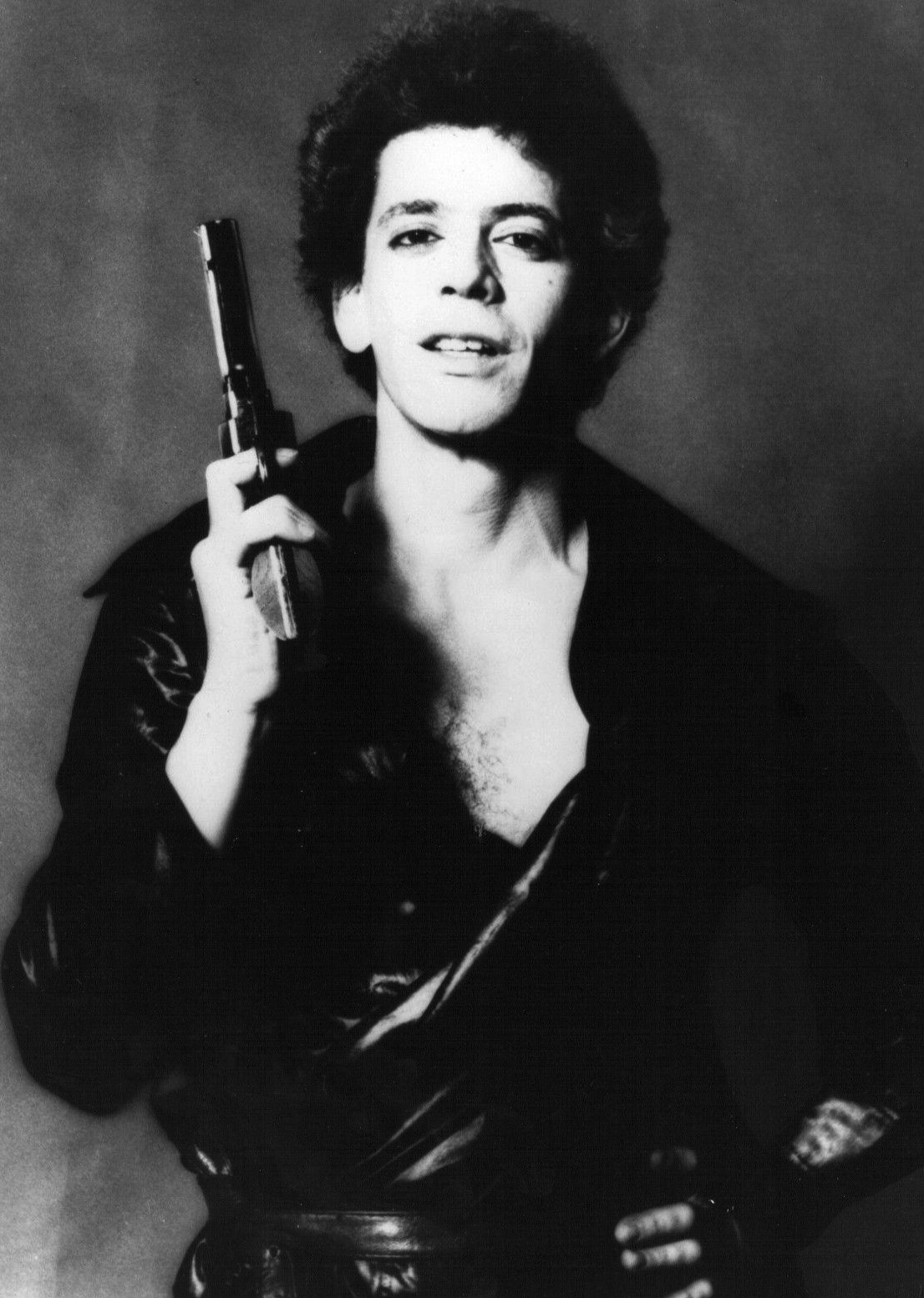
Lou Reed, 1977

Year	Title	Peak chart positions				Certifications	Album
Year	Title	US	US Main	AUS	UK	Certifications	Album
1972	"I Can't Stand It"	—	—	—	—		Lou Reed
1972	"Walk and Talk It"	—	—	—	—		Lou Reed
1972	"Walk on the Wild Side"	16	—	95	10	BPI: Platinum	Transformer
1973	"Satellite of Love"	—	—	—	—	BPI: Silver	Transformer
1973	"Vicious"	—	—	—	—		Transformer
1973	"How Do You Think It Feels"	—	—	—	—		Berlin
1974	"Caroline Says"	—	—	—	—		Berlin
1974	"Sweet Jane"	—	—	—	—		Rock 'n' Roll Animal
1974	"Sally Can't Dance"	—	—	—	—		Sally Can't Dance
1976	"Charley's Girl"	—	—	—	—		Coney Island Baby
1976	"Crazy Feeling"	—	—	—	—		Coney Island Baby
1976	"I Believe in Love"	—	—	—	—		Rock and Roll Heart
1977	"Chooser and the Chosen One"	—	—	—	—		Rock and Roll Heart
1977	"Rock and Roll Heart"	—	—	—	—		Rock and Roll Heart
1978	"Street Hassle"	—	—	—	—		Street Hassle
1979	"Disco Mystic"	—	—	—	—		The Bells
1979	"City Lights"	—	—	—	—		The Bells
1980	"The Power of Positive Drinking"	—	—	—	—		Growing Up in Public
1982	"The Blue Mask"	—	—	—	—		The Blue Mask
1982	"Women"	—	—	—	—		The Blue Mask
1983	"Don't Talk to Me About Work"	—	—	—	—		Legendary Hearts
1983	"Martial Law"	—	—	—	—		Legendary Hearts
1984	"I Love You, Suzanne"	—	28	71	78		New Sensations
1984	"My Red Joystick"	—	—	—	—		New Sensations
1984	"High in the City"	—	—	—	—		New Sensations
1985	"My Love Is Chemical"	—	—	—	—		White Nights
1985	"September Song"	—	—	—	—		Lost in the Stars: The Music of Kurt Weill
1986	"The Original Wrapper"	—	—	—	—		Mistrial
1986	"No Money Down"	—	19	75	—		Mistrial
1986	"Soul Man" (with Samuel David Moore)	—	—	—	30		Soul Man soundtrack
1989	"Romeo Had Juliette"	—	—	—	—		New York
1989	"Dirty Blvd."	—	18	45	—		New York
1989	"Busload of Faith"	—	47	—	—		New York
1990	"Nobody but You" (with John Cale)	—	—	—	—		Songs for Drella
1992	"Sword of Damocles"	—	—	—	—		Magic and Loss
1992	"What's Good"	—	—	—	—		Magic and Loss
1996	"Adventurer"	—	—	—	—		Set the Twilight Reeling
1996	"NYC Man"	—	—	—	—		Set the Twilight Reeling
1996	"Hookywooky"	—	—	172	—		Set the Twilight Reeling
1997	"Perfect Day" (as part of Artists for Children in Need)	—	—	—	1	BPI: Platinum	Non-album single
2000	"Future Farmers of America"	—	—	—	—		Ecstasy
2000	"Modern Dance"	—	—	—	—		Ecstasy
2000	"Paranoia Key of E"	—	—	—	—		Ecstasy
2002	"Who Am I? (Tripitena's Song)"	—	—	—	—		The Raven
2003	"Perfect Day (Sessions@AOL)"	—	—	—	—		Non-album single
2004	"Sweet Jane (Live in Los Angeles, 2003)"	—	—	—	—		Non-album single cut from Animal Serenade
2004	"Satellite of Love '04"	—	—	83	10		NYC Man: Greatest Hits
2007	"Gravity"/"Safety Zone"	—	—	—	—		Music Inspired by the Film Nanking
2007	"Tranquilize" (with The Killers)	—	—	84	13		Sawdust
2011	"The View" (with Metallica)	—	—	—	—		Lulu
2022	"Heroin (May 1965 Demo)"	—	—	—	—		Words & Music, May 1965
2022	"Men of Good Fortune (May 1965 Demo)"	—	—	—	—		Words & Music, May 1965
2023	"Open Invitation"	—	—	—	—		Non-album single cut from New Sensations
"—" denotes singles that did not chart, or singles not released in a particular territory.

== Other album appearances ==
=== Studio ===
Year	Song(s)	Album	Notes
1983	"Little Sister"	Get Crazy soundtrack	Original song
1985	"Hot Hips"	Perfect soundtrack	Original song
1988	"Something Happened"	Permanent Record soundtrack	Original song
1990	"One World One Voice"	One World One Voice	A concept album for environmental awareness. Reed and his band perform a track with overdubs from Richard Galliano and Penguin Café Orchestra
1993	"Tarbelly and Featherfoot"	Sweet Relief: A Benefit for Victoria Williams	Victoria Williams cover
1993	"Why Can't I Be Good"	Faraway, So Close! soundtrack	Original song
1995	"You'll Know You Were Loved"	Friends soundtrack	Original song
1997	"This Magic Moment"	Lost Highway soundtrack	Doc Pomus & Mort Shuman cover
2004	"Gentle Breeze"	Mary Had a Little Amp	Written and sung by Lou Reed and Laurie Anderson for a charity album
2006	"Leave Her Johnny"	Rogue's Gallery: Pirate Ballads, Sea Songs, and Chanteys	Traditional song
2010	"Solsbury Hill"	And I'll Scratch Yours	Peter Gabriel cover released as a single in 2010, released on And I'll Scratch Yours in 2013
2011	"The Debt I Owe"	Note of Hope - A Celebration of Woody Guthrie	Original song based on Hank Williams' writings
2011	"Peggy Sue"	Rave On Buddy Holly	Jerry Allison & Norman Petty cover

=== Live and remix ===
Year	Song(s)	Album	Type	Notes
1991	"What's Good"	Until the End of the World soundtrack	Remix	Early mix
1993	"Foot of Pride"	The 30th Anniversary Concert Celebration	Live	Recorded live on October 16, 1992, at Madison Square Garden in New York City.
1996	"Sweet Jane"	The Concert for the Rock and Roll Hall of Fame	Live	Recorded live in 1995 with Soul Asylum
1997	"September Song"	September Songs – The Music of Kurt Weill	Remix	New version, released on video in 1994
2001	"Set the Twilight Reeling"	The Best of Sessions at West 54th	Live	Broadcast in 1998
2006	"Perfect Day" and "Vicious"	The Bridge School Collection, Vol.1	Live	
2006	"See That My Grave Is Kept Clean"	The Harry Smith Project Live, Vol. 2	Live	

=== Guest appearances ===
Year	Album	Artist	Details	Ref.
1976	Wild Angel	Nelson Slater	Backing vocals, piano, producer	
1978	Urban Desire	Genya Ravan	Duet Vocals ("Aye Co'lorado")	
1988	Boom Boom Chi Boom Boom	Tom Tom Club	Backing vocals ("Femme Fatale")	
1988	Nothing But the Truth	Rubén Blades	Guest vocals ("Hopes on Hold", "Letters to the Vatican", "The Calm Before the Storm")	
1988	Duets	Rob Wasserman	Guest vocals ("One for My Baby (and One More for the Road)")	
1989	Yo Frankie	Dion DiMucci		
1989	Street Fighting Years	Simple Minds	Guest vocals ("This Is Your Land")	
1991	I Spent a Week There the Other Night	Moe Tucker	Guitar ("Fired Up" and "I'm Not")	
1992	I Still Believe in You	Vince Gill	backing vocals on "Under These Conditions"	
1994	A Date with The Smithereens	The Smithereens	Guest vocals ("Point of No Return", "Long Way Back Again")	
1994	Greetings from the Gutter	David A. Stewart	Guest vocals ("You Talk a Lot")	
1994	Bright Red	Laurie Anderson	Vocals, lyrics ("In Our Sleep")	
1998	Music for Children	John Zorn	Guest vocals ("Cycles Du Nord")	
2002	Hitting the Ground	Gordon Gano	Guest vocals ("Catch 'Em In the Act")	
2002	No Regrets	Jamie Richards	Backing vocals ("Don't Try to Find Me")	
2002	Night Time!	Dan Zanes & Friends	Guest vocals ("What a Wonderful World")	
2005	No Balance Palace	Kashmir	Guest vocals ("Black Building")	
2005	I Am a Bird Now	Antony and the Johnsons	Guest vocals ("Fistful of Love")	
2006	I Will Break Your Fall	Fernando Saunders	Guest vocals, guitar, writer ("Baton Rouge")	
2006	Intersections (1985–2005)	Bruce Hornsby	Guest vocals ("The Mighty Quinn")	
2006	A Portrait of Howard	Howard Tate	Guest vocals ("How Do You Think It Feels")	
2007	Sawdust	The Killers	Guest vocals ("Tranquilize")	
2007	Recitement	Stephen Emmer	Guest vocals ("Passengers")	
2008	The Family Album	Lucibel Crater	Guest vocals ("Threadbare Funeral")	
2009	Duets	The Blind Boys of Alabama	Guest vocals ("Jesus")	
2009	Solid Ground	Sara Wasserman (Rob Wasserman's daughter)	Guest vocals ("Need To Know")	
2009	Havana Winter	Kevin Hearn and Thin Buckle	Guest vocals ("Coma", "In The Shade", "Helicopter in the Sand")	
2010	Plastic Beach	Gorillaz	Guest vocals ("Some Kind of Nature")	
2010	Mayhem	Imelda May	Guest vocals ("Kentish Town Waltz") (non-album track)	
2011	The Road from Memphis	Booker T. Jones	Guest vocals ("The Bronx")	
2012	Synthetica	Metric	Guest vocals ("The Wanderlust")	

== Videography ==
=== Video albums ===
Year	Video details
1972	Le Bataclan '72 (with John Cale & Nico): Distributor: ORTF/INA Films/Grey Scale; Format: Broadcast (Pop2) / CD+DVD (2017) / streaming
1974	Sally Can’t Dance Tour (a.k.a. Paris Olympia 1974 or Live Performances 1972 & 1974): Distributor: France 3 Cinéma; Format: Broadcast / DVD (2011) / streaming
1983	A Night with Lou Reed: Distributor: RCA/Columbia Pictures/Image Entertainment; Format: Betamax / VHS/Betamax (1984) / VHS/laserdisc (1991) / DVD (1998, 2000, 2007) / streaming (2014)
1984	Coney Island Baby: Live in Jersey: Distributor: MTV/Lionsgate Home Entertainment; Format: Broadcast / VHS (1987) / VHS/laserdisc (1988) / VHS (1992, UK 1993) / DVD / streaming (2015)
1985	Live in Barcelona 1984: Distributor: Televisión Española; Format: Broadcast (La Edad de Oro) / DVD (2012) / streaming
1990	The New York Album: Distributor: Warner Reprise Video; Format: VHS/laserdisc / DVD/streaming (2020)
1990	Songs for Drella: Distributor: Warner Reprise Video/The Criterion Collection; Format: VHS/laserdisc / streaming (2022) / DVD (2023)
1992	Magic and Loss Live in Concert: Distributor: Sire Records/Warner Reprise Video; Format: VHS/laserdisc
1998	Rock & Roll Heart: Distributor: American Masters/Fox Lorber/WinStar; Format: Broadcast/VHS/DVD / streaming (2013)
2001	Classic Albums: Transformer: Distributor: Eagle Vision; Format: Broadcast/VHS/DVD / DVD (2010) / Blu-ray (2014) / streaming (2019)
2005	Spanish Fly: Live in Spain: Distributor: Sanctuary Records Group; Format: DVD
2005	Live at Montreux 2000: Distributor: Eagle Vision; Format: DVD / DVD (2010) / Blu-ray/streaming (2014)
2007	Metal Machine Music (with Zeitkratzer): Distributor: Asphodel; Format: DVD+CD/streaming
2007	Lou Reed: Berlin: Distributor: Third Rail Releasing/Artificial Eye; Format: Theatrical / DVD/Blu-ray/download/streaming (2008)
2011	Lollapalooza Live: Distributor: Sister Ray Enterprises; Format: DVD
2013	In Memory of Lou Reed: Distributor: Prime Vision; Format: Broadcast / DVD/Blu-ray (2014)

=== Music videos ===
Year	Title	Director(s)	Ref.
1982	"Women"		
1983	"Legendary Hearts"		
1983	"Don't Talk to Me About Work"		
1984	"I Love You, Suzanne"		
1984	"My Red Joystick"		
1986	"The Original Wrapper"	Zbigniew Rybczyński	
1986	"No Money Down"	Godley & Creme	
1989	"Dirty Blvd."	Paula Walker	
1989	"Busload of Faith"		
1990	"Work" (with John Cale)		
1992	"What's Good"	Matt Mahurin	
1996	"Hooky Wooky"	Matt Mahurin	
2000	"Ecstasy"	Michele Civetta	
2000	"Modern Dance"	Stefan Sagmeister	
2003	"NYC Man"		
2007	"Tranquilize" (with The Killers)	Anthony Mandler	
2011	"The View" (with Metallica)	Darren Aronofsky	

== Tribute albums ==
Year	Title	Release date	Label
2003	After Hours: A Tribute to the Music of Lou Reed	2003 (US)	Wampus Multimedia
2013	High Velocity, a Tribute to Lou Reed's Metal Machine Music by Alejandro Cohen	January 9, 2013	Simballrec/Bandcamp
2014	Transformed: A Tribute to Lou Reed	Oct 14, 2014 (US)	Mint 400 Records
2014	Lou Reed: mila esker	November 11, 2014 (Spain)	TX audiovisuales
2014	Burger and Mens Present: A Tribute to Lou Reed	2014 (US)	Burger/Mens Recordings
2021	What Goes On: The Songs of Lou Reed	2021 (UK)	Ace
2024	The Power of the Heart: A Tribute to Lou Reed	April 20, 2024 (worldwide)	Light in the Attic
2024	Metal Machine Muzak: An Ambient Reimagining	May 3, 2024	Discograffiti
