= NYC Man: Greatest Hits =

Greatest hits album by Lou Reed
- Released: August 31, 2004
- Recorded: 1967–2003
- Genre: Rock
- Length: 78:58
- Label: BMG International
- Producer: Various

Lou Reed chronology
Animal Serenade (2004)	NYC Man: Greatest Hits (2004)	Hudson River Wind Meditations (2007)

Professional ratings
Review scores
Source	Rating
Allmusic	link

NYC Man: Greatest Hits is a compilation by Lou Reed. It's a single-disc version of his previous compilation NYC Man: The Ultimate Collection 1967–2003 with two new mixes of "Satellite of Love" and "Walk on the Wild Side".

== Track listing ==
1. I'm Waiting for the Man (by The Velvet Underground from The Velvet Underground & Nico (1967))
2. White Light/White Heat (by The Velvet Underground from White Light/White Heat (1968))
3. Pale Blue Eyes (by The Velvet Underground from The Velvet Underground (1969))
4. Sweet Jane (by The Velvet Underground from Loaded (1970))
5. Satellite of Love (from Transformer (1972))
6. Walk on the Wild Side (from Transformer (1972))
7. Perfect Day (from Transformer (1972))
8. Berlin (from Berlin (1973); also released on Lou Reed (1972))
9. Coney Island Baby (from Coney Island Baby (1976))
10. The Blue Mask (from The Blue Mask (1982))
11. Legendary Hearts (from Legendary Hearts (1983))
12. Dirty Blvd. (from New York (1989))
13. Magic and Loss – The Summation (from Magic and Loss (1992))
14. NYC Man (from Set the Twilight Reeling (1996))
15. Ecstasy (from Ecstasy (2000))
16. Who Am I? (Tripiena Song) (from The Raven (2003))
17. Satellite of Love 2004
18. Walk on the Wild Side (Bertallot Radio Remix)
