= The Essential Lou Reed =

Compilation album by Lou Reed
- Released: September 13, 2011
- Genre: Rock
- Length: 156:12
- Label: RCA
- Producer: Lou Reed, Hal Willner, Richard Robinson, Doug Yule, Tom Wilson, Sterling Morrison, Andy Warhol, David Bowie, Mick Ronson, Sean Fullan

Lou Reed chronology
The Creation of the Universe (2008)	The Essential Lou Reed (2011)	Lulu (2011)

Professional ratings
Review scores
Source	Rating
Allmusic	3.5/5 stars

The Essential Lou Reed is a compilation album by Lou Reed released in 2011 by RCA Records. The album features classic Lou Reed solo work and songs from his band the Velvet Underground. The track listing is identical to NYC Man (The Ultimate Collection 1967–2003).

== Track listing ==
=== Disc 1 ===
All tracks are written by Lou Reed, except where noted.

No.	Title	Length
1.	"Who Am I? (Tripitena's Song)" (from The Raven, 2003)	5:33
2.	"Sweet Jane" (The Velvet Underground; from Loaded, 1970)	3:01
3.	"Rock & Roll" (The Velvet Underground; from Loaded, 1970)	4:40
4.	"I'm Waiting for the Man" (The Velvet Underground; from The Velvet Underground & Nico, 1967)	4:36
5.	"White Light/White Heat" (Live version from Rock 'n' Roll Animal, 1974; originally by The Velvet Underground from White Light/White Heat, 1968)	5:00
6.	"Street Hassle" (I. Waltzing Matilda / II. Street Hassle / III. Slipaway; from Street Hassle, 1978)	11:00
7.	"Berlin" (version two from Berlin, 1973)	3:23
8.	"Caroline Says II" (from Berlin, 1973)	4:12
9.	"The Kids" (from Berlin, 1973)	7:49
10.	"Walk on the Wild Side" (from Transformer, 1972)	4:11
11.	"Kill Your Sons" (Live version from Live in Italy/Live in Concert, 1984/1996; originally from Sally Can't Dance, 1974)	4:08
12.	"Vicious" (from Transformer, 1972)	2:57
13.	"The Blue Mask" (from The Blue Mask, 1982)	2:46
14.	"I'll Be Your Mirror" (Live version from Perfect Night: Live in London, 1998; originally by The Velvet Underground from The Velvet Underground & Nico, 1967)	2:46
15.	"Magic and Loss: The Summation" (Reed, Mike Rathke; from Magic and Loss, 1992)	6:35
16.	"Ecstasy" (from Ecstasy, 2000)	4:27

=== Disc 2 ===
No.	Title	Length
1.	"I Wanna Be Black" (Live version from Live: Take No Prisoners, 1978; originally from Street Hassle, 1978)	6:29
2.	"Temporary Thing" (from Rock and Roll Heart, 1976)	5:14
3.	"Shooting Star" (from Street Hassle, 1978)	3:12
4.	"Legendary Hearts" (from Legendary Hearts, 1983)	3:05
5.	"Heroin" (Live version from Live in Italy/Live in Concert, 1984/1996, 2001; originally by The Velvet Underground from The Velvet Underground & Nico, 1967)	8:22
6.	"Coney Island Baby" (from Coney Island Baby, 1976)	6:36
7.	"The Last Shot" (from Legendary Hearts, 1983)	3:20
8.	"The Bells" (Reed, Marty Fogel; from The Bells, 1979)	9:20
9.	"Perfect Day" (from Transformer, 1972)	3:43
10.	"Sally Can't Dance" (from Sally Can't Dance, 1974)	2:55
11.	"Satellite of Love" (from Transformer, 1972)	3:37
12.	"NYC Man" (from Set the Twilight Reeling, 1996)	4:55
13.	"Dirty Blvd." (from New York, 1989)	3:30
14.	"Rock Minuet" (from Ecstasy, 2000)	6:56
15.	"Pale Blue Eyes" (The Velvet Underground; from The Velvet Underground, 1969)	5:38
Total length:		156:12

== Chart ==
Chart (2013)	Peak position
US Billboard 200	155
