= Between Thought and Expression: The Lou Reed Anthology =

Box set by Lou Reed
- Released: April 14, 1992
- Recorded: 1972–1988
- Genre: Rock
- Length: 219:30
- Label: RCA Records

Lou Reed chronology
Walk on the Wild Side & Other Hits (1992)	Between Thought and Expression: The Lou Reed Anthology (1992)	Set the Twilight Reeling (1996)

Professional ratings
Review scores
Source	Rating
Allmusic	4/5 stars
NME	8/10

Between Thought and Expression: The Lou Reed Anthology is a box set by Lou Reed. This 1992 release covers the first 20 years of his solo career, including the unreleased studio tracks "Downtown Dirt", an early version of "Leave Me Alone", Francis Scott Key's "America (Star Spangled Banner)" from the 1980 Growing Up in Public sessions and an edited excerpt from the Metal Machine Music album. Additionally there are previously unreleased live tracks: "Heroin" from 1976 featuring jazz trumpeter Don Cherry, "Here Comes the Bride" from 1978, and "Voices of Freedom" from the Amnesty International tour A Conspiracy of Hope. The set also featured the 1975 B-side "Nowhere at All" and "Little Sister" from the soundtrack to the 1983 film Get Crazy.

Jeffrey Morgan was asked by Rob Bowman to name the Lou Reed anthology that he was assembling with Reed for RCA Records. Morgan named it Between Thought and Expression, quoting from his favorite Velvet Underground song "Some Kinda Love". In return, Bowman thanked Morgan in his liner notes to the anthology.

== Track listing ==
=== Disc: 1 ===
1. "I Can't Stand It" 2:36 (from Lou Reed)
2. "Lisa Says" 5:33 (from Lou Reed)
3. "Ocean" 5:06 (from Lou Reed)
4. "Walk on the Wild Side" 4:13 (from Transformer)
5. "Satellite of Love" 3:39 (from Transformer)
6. "Vicious" 2:55 (from Transformer)
7. "Caroline Says I" 3:57 (from Berlin)
8. "How Do You Think It Feels" 3:43 (from Berlin)
9. "Oh Jim" 5:12 (from Berlin)
10. "Caroline Says II" 4:13 (from Berlin)
11. "The Kids" 7:51 (from Berlin)
12. "Sad Song" 7:08 (from Berlin)
13. "Sweet Jane" (live) 7:57 (from Rock 'n' Roll Animal)
14. "Kill Your Sons" 3:37 (from Sally Can't Dance)
15. "Coney Island Baby" 6:37 (from Coney Island Baby)

=== Disc: 2 ===
1. "Nowhere at All" 3:15 (b-side of "Charley's Girl," European release only)
2. "Kicks" 6:02 (from Coney Island Baby)
3. "Downtown Dirt" 4:17 (previously unreleased)
4. "Rock & Roll Heart" 3:06 (from Rock and Roll Heart)
5. "Vicious Circle" 2:52 (from Rock and Roll Heart)
6. "Temporary Thing" 5:14 (from Rock and Roll Heart)
7. "Real Good Time Together" 3:21 (from Street Hassle)
8. "Leave Me Alone" 5:33 (previously unreleased)
9. "Heroin" 12:20 (previously unreleased)
10. "Here Comes the Bride" 6:06 (previously unreleased)
11. "Street Hassle" 11:00 (from Street Hassle)
12. "Metal Machine Music" 1:32 (previously unreleased excerpt)
13. "The Bells" 6:31 (from The Bells)

=== Disc: 3 ===
1. "America" 2:50 (previously unreleased)
2. "Think It Over" 3:26 (from Growing Up in Public)
3. "Teach the Gifted Children" 3:15 (from Growing Up in Public)
4. "The Gun" 3:41 (from The Blue Mask)
5. "The Blue Mask" 5:03 (from The Blue Mask)
6. "My House" 5:25 (from The Blue Mask)
7. "Waves of Fear" 4:13 (from The Blue Mask)
8. "Little Sister" 6:07 (from Get Crazy soundtrack)
9. "Legendary Hearts" 3:24 (from Legendary Hearts)
10. "The Last Shot" 3:23 (from Legendary Hearts)
11. "New Sensations" 5:44 (from New Sensations)
12. "My Friend George" 3:56 (from New Sensations)
13. "Doin' the Things That We Want To" 3:56 (from New Sensations)
14. "The Original Wrapper" 3:39 (from Mistrial)
15. "Video Violence" 5:35 (from Mistrial)
16. "Tell It to Your Heart " 5:12 (from Mistrial)
17. "Voices of Freedom" 5:15 (previously unreleased)

== Charts ==
Weekly chart performance for Between Thought and Expression: The Lou Reed Anthology
Chart (1992)	Peak position
Australian Albums (ARIA)	165
