= Live at Montreux 2000 =

Video by Lou Reed
- Released: 2005
- Recorded: 13 July 2000
- Venue: Auditorium Stravinski, Montreux Jazz Festival; Montreux, Switzerland
- Label: Eagle Vision

Live at Montreux 2000 is a concert DVD by Lou Reed, released in 2005 by Eagle Vision. It was recorded at the 2000 Montreux Jazz Festival in Montreux, Switzerland. Reed performed eight songs from his Ecstasy album plus a few older ones.

== Track listing ==
All tracks composed by Lou Reed; except where indicated

1. "Paranoia Key of E" Ecstasy, 2000
2. "Turn to Me" New Sensations, 1984
3. "Modern Dance" Ecstasy, 2000
4. "Ecstasy" Ecstasy, 2000
5. "Smalltown" (Reed, John Cale), Songs for Drella, 1990
6. "Future Farmers of America" Ecstasy, 2000
7. "Turning Around Time" Ecstasy, 2000
8. "Romeo Had Juliette" New York, 1989
9. "Riptide" Set the Twilight Reeling, 1996
10. "Rock Minuet Ecstasy, 2000
11. "Mystic Child" Ecstasy, 2000
12. "Tatters" Ecstasy, 2000
13. "Set the Twilight Reeling" Set the Twilight Reeling, 1996
14. "Dirty Blvd." New York, 1989
15. "Dime Store Mystery" New York, 1989
16. "Perfect Day" Transformer, 1972

== Personnel ==
- Lou Reed - guitar, vocals
- Fernando Saunders - bass guitar, backing vocals
- Mike Rathke - guitar
- Tony Thunder Smith - drums
