= The Best of Lou Reed & The Velvet Underground =

Greatest hits album by Lou Reed and The Velvet Underground
- Released: 1995
- Recorded: 1966–1984
- Genre: Rock
- Language: English
- Label: Global Rad
- Producer: Various

Professional ratings
Review scores
Source	Rating
Allmusic	2/5 stars
The Encyclopedia of Popular Music	4/5 stars

The Best of Lou Reed & The Velvet Underground is a compilation of some of Lou Reed's and some of The Velvet Underground's songs. It was released in 1995, but not in the U.S.

== Track listing ==
1. "Sunday Morning" (from The Velvet Underground & Nico, 1967)
2. "I'm Waiting for the Man" (from The Velvet Underground & Nico)
3. "Venus in Furs" (from The Velvet Underground & Nico)
4. "Candy Says" (from The Velvet Underground, 1969)
5. "Pale Blue Eyes" (from The Velvet Underground)
6. "Beginning to See the Light" (from The Velvet Underground)
7. "Satellite of Love" (from Transformer, 1972)
8. "Nowhere at All" (non-album song recorded in 1975)
9. "Vicious" (from Transformer)
10. "Perfect Day" (from Transformer)
11. "Walk on the Wild Side" (from Transformer)
12. "How Do You Think It Feels" (from Berlin, 1973)
13. "Sweet Jane" (live) (from Rock 'n' Roll Animal, 1974)
14. "White Light/White Heat" (live) (from Rock 'n' Roll Animal, 1974)
15. "Sally Can't Dance" (from Sally Can't Dance, 1974)
16. "Wild Child" (from Lou Reed, 1972)
17. "I Love You" (from Lou Reed)
18. "Berlin" (from Berlin)
19. "Coney Island Baby" (from Coney Island Baby, 1976)
20. "I Love You, Suzanne" (from New Sensations, 1984)

== Certifications ==
- UK-Gold
