= The Very Best of Lou Reed =

Greatest hits album by Lou Reed
- Released: 1999
- Genre: Rock
- Length: 72:41
- Label: Camden Deluxe

Lou Reed chronology
Set the Twilight Reeling (1996)	The Very Best of Lou Reed (1999)	Ecstasy (2000)

Professional ratings
Review scores
Source	Rating
AllMusic	3.5/5 stars

The Very Best of Lou Reed is a compilation album by American rock musician Lou Reed, released in 1999 by Camden Deluxe.

== Track listing ==
1. "Perfect Day"
2. "Walk on the Wild Side"
3. "Vicious"
4. "Rock and Roll Heart"
5. "The Gun"
6. "I Love You, Suzanne"
7. "Caroline Says II"
8. "Men of Good Fortune"
9. "My Friend George"
10. "Lisa Says"
11. "I Want to Boogie with You"
12. "Ocean"
13. "The Last Shot"
14. "I Wanna be Black"
15. "Sally Can't Dance"
16. "Coney Island Baby"
17. "Berlin"
18. "Satellite of Love"

== Charts ==
Chart (2013)	Peak position
Danish Albums (Hitlisten)	35
French Albums (SNEP)	116
Hungarian Albums (MAHASZ)	38
Norwegian Albums (VG-lista)	19
Portuguese Albums (AFP)	29
