= Paolo Preite =

Italian singer-songwriter (born 1985)

- Born: 1985 (age 39–40); Frascati, Italy
- Genres: Folk rock
- Occupation: Musician
- Instrument(s): Guitar, harmonica
- Website: paolopreite.net

Paolo Preite (born 1985) is an Italian singer-songwriter. He was born in 1985 in Frascati and began with composing of music at age of fifteen. His debut album Don't Stop Dreaming was produced by Fernando Saunders and featured drummer Kenny Aronoff among others. It was recorded in various studios in Ostrava, Los Angeles and Rome.

== Discography ==
- Don't Stop Dreaming (2015)
- An Eye on the World (2018)

== Videography ==
- I wanna hold your hands feat. Fernando Saunders & Kenny Aronoff - directed by Andrea Aronica (2013)
- Where did you go feat. Fernando Saunders - directed by Federico Mudoni (2015)
- Don't stop dreaming - directed by Francesco Albanese (2015)
- Can't find a reason feat. Kenny Aronoff - directed by Federico Mudoni (2016)
