= Different Times: Lou Reed in the '70s =

Different Times: Lou Reed in the 70s

Greatest hits album by Lou Reed
- Released: May 1996
- Recorded: January 5, 1972 – October 18, 1975
- Genre: Rock
- Length: 76:16
- Label: RCA Records

Lou Reed chronology
Set the Twilight Reeling (1996)	Different Times: Lou Reed in the 70s (1996)	Live in Concert (1996)

Professional ratings
Review scores
Source	Rating
Allmusic	4.5/5 stars

A chronological set from Lou Reed's first stint at RCA Records (1972–1975), Different Times is another anthology of his most famous work. The album collage and design were created by photographer/fine artist Daniel Arsenault. Naomi Taubleb was the art director and graphic designer on the packaging.

== Track listing ==
1. "I Can't Stand It" - 2:36
2. "Love Makes You Feel" - 3:10
3. "Lisa Says" - 5:31
4. "Walk on the Wild Side" - 4:13
5. "Perfect Day" - 3:45
6. "Satellite of Love" - 3:39
7. "Vicious" - 2:55
8. "Berlin" - 3:23
9. "Caroline Says I" - 3:57
10. "Sad Song" - 7:08
11. "Caroline Says II" - 4:13
12. "Sweet Jane" - 7:59
13. "Kill Your Sons" - 3:38
14. "Sally Can't Dance" - 4:10
15. "A Gift" - 3:45
16. "She's My Best Friend" - 5:59
17. "Coney Island Baby" - 6:36
