= Legendary Lou Reed =

Compilation album by Lou Reed
- Released: July 9, 2002
- Recorded: January 1972 – September 10, 1983
- Genre: Rock
- Label: BMG International

Lou Reed chronology
American Poet (2001)	Legendary Lou Reed (2002)	The Raven (2003)

Professional ratings
Review scores
Source	Rating
Allmusic	4/5 stars

3-CD compilation of Lou Reed's work from his eponymous debut in 1972 to Mistrial in 1986, excluding his 1976–1980 Arista label albums: Rock and Roll Heart, Street Hassle, The Bells and Growing Up in Public.

== Track listing ==
1. "Going Down"
2. "I Love You"
3. "Love Makes You Feel"
4. "Ocean"
5. "Walk on the Wild Side"
6. "Andy’s Chest"
7. "Perfect Day"
8. "Make Up"
9. "Vicious"
10. "Lady Day"
11. "Caroline Says 1"
12. "How Do You Think It Feels"
13. "Oh Jim"
14. "Men of Good Fortune"
15. "Rock & Roll"
16. "Good Taste"
17. "Intro Sweet Jane"
18. "Kill Your Sons"
19. "Billy"
20. "Sally Can't Dance (7-inch version)"
21. "Satellite of Love" (live)
22. "Crazy Feeling"
23. "A Gift"
24. "Nowhere at All"
25. "Nobody’s Business"
26. "Coney Island Baby"
27. "Underneath the Bottle"
28. "The Gun"
29. "Waves of Fear"
30. "The Day John Kennedy Died"
31. "Legendary Hearts"
32. "Home of the Brave"
33. "Rooftop Garden"
34. "Bottoming Out"
35. "Make Up Mind"
36. "The Last Shot"
37. "Betrayed"
38. "Sweet Jane" (live)
39. "I'm Waiting for the Man" (live)
40. "White Light/White Heat" (live)
41. "I Love You Suzanne"
42. "Turn to Me"
43. "What Becomes a Legend Most"
44. "Fly into the Sun"
45. "High in the City"
46. "New Sensations"
47. "Outside"
48. "Mistrial"
49. "I Remember You"
50. "No Money Down"
