= Walk on the Wild Side & Other Hits =

Greatest hits album by Lou Reed
- Released: March 24, 1992
- Recorded: January 5, 1972–October 18, 1975
- Genre: Rock
- Label: RCA Records

Lou Reed chronology
Magic and Loss (1992)	Walk on the Wild Side & Other Hits (1992)	Between Thought and Expression: The Lou Reed Anthology (1992)

Professional ratings
Review scores
Source	Rating
Allmusic	3/5 stars

A low budget release centered on the title track, which was a Top Twenty hit for Lou Reed in 1973.

== Track listing ==
1. "Walk on the Wild Side"
2. "Sweet Jane" (live)
3. "White Light/White Heat" (live)
4. "Sally Can't Dance"
5. "Nowhere at All"
6. "Coney Island Baby"
