= Spectacle: Elvis Costello with... =

UK/Canadian television series

- Genre: Live music/talk show
- Directed by: Dave Russell; Alex Coletti
- Presented by: Elvis Costello
- Countries of origin: Canada; United Kingdom
- Original language: English
- No. of seasons: 2
- No. of episodes: 20

Production
- Executive producers: Martin Katz; Elvis Costello; David Furnish; Jordan Jacobs; Elton John; Steve Hamilton Shaw; Stephen Warden; Mala Chapple
- Producer: Alex Coletti

Original release
- Network: Channel 4 CTV
- Release: 2008 – 2010

Spectacle: Elvis Costello with... is a British-Canadian television series that was shown on Channel 4 in the UK, CTV in Canada. The show was recorded live at Harlem's famous Apollo Theatre and 30 Rock's 8H studio in New York. It features intimate interviews between the host, Elvis Costello, and various musical guests intertwined with performances by Costello and the guests, separately and together.

Its first season consisted of 13 parts and was screened in 2008/09. The second season consisted of 7 parts and was screened in 2009/10.

== Season One ==
=== Elton John ===
The first episode featured Elton John as the guest. (He is also credited as one of many executive producers.) The show opened with Elvis Costello performing John's "Border Song". The show then had interview segments with John, in which he talked about musical influences such as Laura Nyro, David Ackles, Allen Toussaint, Leon Russell (with whom he toured twice), and other singer-songwriters of the 1960s. John also paid tribute to lyricist Bernie Taupin, saying that the two have never had a harsh word between them. The show was intertwined with performances, including "Ballad of Well-Known Gun" performed by Elvis Costello and the house band, "Burn Down the Mission" performed by Elton John, and "Working in the Coal Mine" and Ackles' "Down River" – both duets by Elton and Elvis with the band.

=== Lou Reed and Julian Schnabel ===
Lou Reed, the musician, songwriter, and former lead singer of the Velvet Underground, was featured in the second episode. The show opened with Costello and the house band performing the Velvet's "Femme Fatale", from their debut album, The Velvet Underground & Nico. The Velvets' "I'm Waiting for the Man" was played by the house band while Costello introduced Reed. The interview featured Reed talking about his influences, music, and songwriting. Costello and Reed then dueted on Reed's "Perfect Day". Reed's friend the artist and filmmaker Julian Schnabel was featured with Reed during the second portion of the show. Schnabel talked mostly about Reed and recited Reed's song "Rock Minuet" word for word. The show ended in a duet as Reed and Costello sang Reed's "Set the Twilight Reeling".

House band members:

Larry Campbell – Mandolin / Guitar
Tony Garnier – Bass
Kevin Hearn – Piano
Steve Nieve – Accordion / Piano
Jenny Scheinman – Violin

=== The Police ===
The three members of The Police are interviewed separately by Costello; firstly Andy Summers then Stewart Copeland, and finally Sting. The band are then interviewed collectively before playing with Costello. They play Costello's "Watching The Detectives", moving on to their own "Walking on the Moon" before finishing with a cover of Cream's "Sunshine of Your Love".

=== Rufus Wainwright and Kate McGarrigle ===
Rufus Wainwright talked frankly about his youth, being the son of Loudon Wainwright III and Kate McGarrigle; and, brother of Martha Wainwright and half-brother of Lucy Wainwright Roche. After a long discussion with Costello, and a solo, they were joined by Wainwright's mother on banjo for a lyric song.

== Season Two ==
=== Bono and the Edge ===
In this episode Bono, The Edge and Elvis Costello performed "Alison", "Stuck in a Moment" and a medley of "Pump It Up" and "Get on Your Boots". Bono and The Edge recorded the first episode of Season 2 on 15 September 2009 at the Masonic Temple (Toronto) while on tour to perform 2 nights on their U2360˚ Tour 16 and 17 September.

=== Neko Case, Sheryl Crow, Ron Sexsmith and Jesse Winchester ===
Jesse Winchester sang “Sham-A-Ling-Dong-Ding” solo sitting beside the other guests. See the recorded performance at. Jesse's website there says: "Jesse Winchester was a singer’s singer and a songwriter’s songwriter. His voice, by turns earthy, ethereal, sly, and heartbreakingly direct, delivered some of the finest lyrics of our time over more than four decades of live performance, and thirteen original albums. A gentle man, soft-spoken and courtly, he projected a quiet strength in performance. His songs have been covered by artists as different as Jimmy Buffett, Elvis Costello, Reba McIntyre, Wilson Pickett, Waylon Jennings, Emmylou Harris, Bonnie Raitt and the Everly Brothers."
