= Ecstasy (Lou Reed album) =

Studio album by Lou Reed
- Released: April 4, 2000
- Studios: Sear Sound, New York City
- Genre: Rock
- Length: 77:15
- Label: Reprise
- Producers: Lou Reed, Hal Willner

Lou Reed chronology
The Very Best of Lou Reed (2000)	Ecstasy (2000)	The Raven (2003)

Ecstasy is the eighteenth solo studio album by American rock musician Lou Reed, released on April 4, 2000, by Reprise Records. A concept album about Reed's personal experiences with marriage and relationships, it is his final rock album that is not a collaboration.

The cover photography is by Stefan Sagmeister, who instructed Reed to masturbate behind a curtain to express the feeling of unashamed ecstasy. The songs "Future Farmers of America" and "Turning Time Around" on the album are adapted from Reed’s collaboration with Robert Wilson, Time Rocker.

== Songs ==
The album begins with "Paranoia in the Key of E" which alternates between the I-IV chords in E major. Patrick Stickies for Stereogum writes that the song "gives way to a swaggering strut more effective and danceable than anything the Rolling Stones could manage in the same century." The song explores themes of marriage, decadence, and debauchery.

"Mystic Child" is based around the A chord and follows a straightforward rock beat, much like its predecessor on the album, "Paranoia in the Key of E". The lyrics reference alcohol ("Liquor shifting through the brain"), insanity ("The manic depressive goes insane"), and "Situation X".

The album continues with "Mad," hailed by critic Robert Christgau as "the most original song on the record" and in a review for Rolling Stone, he referred to it as "amazing." The song is told from the perspective of a man cheating on his partner. The lyrics may reference a previous song by Lou Reed dating back to his time in the Velvet Underground: "Pale Blue Eyes," and the lyrics "But mostly you just make me mad, baby you just make me mad." Both songs describe illicit affairs in Reed's life.

The title track "Ecstasy" explores themes of masochism and obsession. The melody is unusual compared to most of the album which is in the genre of straightforward rock. The song alternates between the F and E major chords commonly associated with the E Phrygian dominant scale, used regularly in flamenco.

"Modern Dance", described by Christgau as an "existentialist joke," reflects on Reed's past decisions, musing over whether he should live somewhere else: "Maybe its time to see Tangiers, A different life-style, some different fears, And maybe I should be in Edinburgh, In a kilt in Edinburgh." Reed also references pollution (The smell of exhaust, the smell of strife) and ponders over past relationships ("It's all downhill after the first kiss"). The song follows a I-II-IV chord progression in A major before the D major becomes a D minor chord.

"Tatters" is cited by Mark Deming as "document[ing] a relationship at the point of collapse." The song is a slow tempo reflection on relationships in theme with the rest of the album exploring marriage, affairs and their emotional and physical extremities.

"Future Farmers of America" is a two-chord rock and roll commentary on race relations, described by critic Kristin Sage Rockermann as "cringe-inducing." Running at just over three minutes, it is one of the shorter songs on the album.

"Turning Time Around" is another slow tempo ballad-like exploration of a romantic relationship, opening by posing the question, "What do you call love?"

"White Prism" is cited by Mark Deming as where "Eros is usually messy" on the album. The song explores themes of aging and sex. It is in G major.

"Rock Minuet" is one of the more lauded songs on the album, cited by Julian Schnabel as one of his favourite songs by Lou Reed. The song follows a straightforward riff played on guitar while Reed plays a solo over it. Strings are also used with his wife and frequent collaborator Laurie Anderson playing electric violin. The song is played in 3/4 time, mirroring the French social dance. The song explores the "unhealthy and perverse," by documenting the life of a young man and his affiliations with drugs and lurid sexual fantasies ("thrill of the needle and anonymous sex") relating it to his father's abusive nature ("His mother on all fours, ah, with his father behind").

"Baton Rouge" is described by Mark Deming as being "an eccentric but moving elegy for a love that didn't last." It is in G major.

"Like a Possum " has come under vitriolic criticism, one critic calling it "unbearable" mostly due to its length at just over 18 minutes. Patrick Stickles of Stereogum describes the music as being "gargantuan guitar tones in the service of slowly bludgeoning a rudimentary two-chord riff", and a "monolithic tower of punishment." However, Mark Deming writes "Never let it be said that Lou Reed has lost the ability to surprise his audience."

"Like a Possum" is followed by "Rouge", a one-minute instrumental played on strings and bass.

The album concludes with "Big Sky", which Patrick Stickles describes as an "honest-to-god, uplifting, life-affirming, fist-pumping Rock Anthem, the likes of which he had so studiously avoided for nearly his entire career." Mark Deming describes the song as a " rousing closer" and concludes that the it "proves that even his [Reed's] uneven works include a few songs you'll certainly want to have in your collection."

== Critical reception ==
Professional ratings
Aggregate scores
Source	Rating
Metacritic	69/100
Review scores
Source	Rating
AllMusic	3/5 stars
Christgau’s Consumer Guide	A
Entertainment Weekly	B−
Mojo	3/5 stars
NME	7/10
Pitchfork	6.5/10
PopMatters	8.1/10
Q	2/5 stars
Rolling Stone	4/5 stars
Spin	4/10

Robert Christgau thought highly of the album, writing: "If his solo career produced a masterwork on the scale of whatever VU album you prefer, this de facto farewell is it." Rolling Stone, in a four star review claimed the album to be "a complex, musically gorgeous synthesis of the obsessions that powered Reed's failed 1973 Berlin and his great marriage albums of the early Eighties, especially The Blue Mask". In a review from AllMusic Mark Deming concludes in a 3 star review by writing that Lou "once again proves that even his uneven works include a few songs you'll certainly want to have in your collection" before jocularly adding "as long as they're not about possums" referencing the song "Like a Possum" which he describes as being "the album's most spectacular miscalculation."

Mark Deming was not alone in his condemnation of "Like a Possum". In a review for Pitchfork, Kristin Sage Rockermann described an "attempt to pair a long poem with off-kilter sound collage, pushes "the possum" into the category of "the unbearable." Patrick Stickles writing for Stereogum describes the song as a "monolithic tower of punishment."

"Rock Minuet" was cited by Julian Schnabel as a favourite of Lou Reed and he recited the lyrics while appearing with Reed on Spectacle: Elvis Costello with....

Robert Christgau placed the album at number 8 on his Pazz & Jop list for that year and the album came at number 63 on the critics poll. Christgau disapproved of the decision writing, "the voters' preference for young repeater Elliott Smith's soupiest album, not to mention old farts the Jayhawks' smiliest, gets me mad", referencing another song from the album: "Mad", a song he praised as the most original on the record.

== Track listing ==
All tracks are written by Lou Reed.

No.	Title	Length
1.	"Paranoia Key of E"	4:28
2.	"Mystic Child"	5:01
3.	"Mad"	4:29
4.	"Ecstasy"	4:25
5.	"Modern Dance"	4:09
6.	"Tatters"	5:55
7.	"Future Farmers of America"	3:01
8.	"Turning Time Around"	4:21
9.	"White Prism"	4:00
10.	"Rock Minuet"	6:56
11.	"Baton Rouge"	4:54
12.	"Like a Possum"	18:03
13.	"Rouge"	1:00
14.	"Big Sky"	6:32

Vinyl release

Side one
No.	Title	Length
1.	"Paranoia Key of E"	4:28
2.	"Mystic Child"	5:02
3.	"Mad"	4:29
4.	"Ecstasy"	4:25

Side two
No.	Title	Length
1.	"Modern Dance"	4:09
2.	"Tatters"	5:56
3.	"Future Farmers of America"	3:01
4.	"Turning Time Around"	4:22
5.	"White Prism"	4:00

Side three
No.	Title	Length
1.	"Like a Possum"	18:03
2.	"Rouge"	1:01

Side four
No.	Title	Length
1.	"Rock Minuet"	6:55
2.	"Baton Rouge"	4:55
3.	"Big Sky"	6:32

== Personnel ==
Musicians

- Lou Reed — vocals, guitar, percussion on "White Prism"
- Mike Rathke — guitar
- Fernando Saunders — bass, background vocals
- Tony "Thunder" Smith — drums, percussion, background vocals
- Don Alias — percussion on "Ecstasy"
- Laurie Anderson — electric violin on "White Prism", "Rouge" and "Rock Minuet"
- Steven Bernstein — trumpet, horn arrangements
- Doug Wieselman — baritone and tenor saxophone
- Paul Shapiro — tenor saxophone
- Jane Scarpantoni — cello

== Charts ==
Chart (2000)	Peak position
Austrian Albums (Ö3 Austria)	48
Belgian Albums (Ultratop Flanders)	47
Dutch Albums (Album Top 100)	68
French Albums (SNEP)	48
German Albums (Offizielle Top 100)	24
Italian Albums (FIMI)	20
Norwegian Albums (VG-lista)	20
Scottish Albums (Official Charts)	58
Swiss Albums (Schweizer Hitparade)	76
UK Albums (OCC)	54
US Billboard 200	183
