= Growing Up in Public (Lou Reed album) =

Studio album by Lou Reed
- Released: April 1980
- Recorded: January 1980
- Studio: AIR Studios (Salem, Montserrat)
- Genre: Rock
- Length: 36:39
- Label: Arista
- Producers: Lou Reed; Michael Fonfara

Lou Reed chronology
The Bells (1979)	Growing Up in Public (1980)	Rock and Roll Diary: 1967–1980 (1980)

Lou Reed studio album chronology
The Bells (1979)	Growing Up in Public (1980)	The Blue Mask (1982)

Professional ratings
Review scores
Source	Rating
AllMusic	2.5/5 stars
Chicago Tribune	3/4 stars
Robert Christgau	B
The Encyclopedia of Popular Music	2/5 stars
MusicHound Rock: The Essential Album Guide	3/5 stars
The Rolling Stone Album Guide	3/5 stars
Spin Alternative Record Guide	6/10
Select	3/5 stars

Growing Up in Public is the tenth solo studio album by American rock musician Lou Reed, released in April 1980 by Arista Records.

Growing Up in Public peaked at No. 158 on the Billboard 200. One single, "The Power of Positive Drinking", was released from the album, but failed to chart.

== Production ==
Michael Fonfara and Reed produced the album. It was written and recorded over a period of six weeks in sessions that took place at George Martin's AIR Studios in Montserrat.

== Critical reception ==
Rolling Stone called the album "a polished package of bombastic rock & roll — indeed, probably Reed's best commercial shot since his 1974 Top Ten anomaly, Sally Can't Dance." Trouser Press wrote that Reed uses "driving rock and delicate melodicism to back thoughtful lyrics and impassioned singing."

== Track listing ==
All tracks are written by Lou Reed and Michael Fonfara.

Side one
No.	Title	Length
1.	"How Do You Speak to an Angel"	4:08
2.	"My Old Man"	3:15
3.	"Keep Away"	3:31
4.	"Growing Up in Public"	3:00
5.	"Standing on Ceremony"	3:32

Side two
No.	Title	Length
6.	"So Alone"	4:05
7.	"Love Is Here to Stay"	3:10
8.	"The Power of Positive Drinking"	2:13
9.	"Smiles"	2:44
10.	"Think It Over"	3:25
11.	"Teach the Gifted Children"	3:20
Total length:		36:39

== Personnel ==
Adapted from the Growing Up in Public liner notes.

Musicians

- Lou Reed – vocals; guitar
- Michael Fonfara – keyboards; guitar
- Chuck Hammer – guitar; guitar synthesizer
- Michael Suchorsky – drums
- Ellard "Moose" Boles – bass guitar; backing vocals
- Stuart Heinrich – guitar; backing vocals

Production and artwork

- Lou Reed – producer
- Michael Fonfara – producer
- Corky Stasiak – engineer
- Tony George – assistant engineer
- Howard Fritzson – design
- Mick Rock – photography

== Chart performance ==
Chart	Peak Position
US Billboard 200	158

== See also ==
- List of albums released in 1980
- Lou Reed's discography
