= Songs for Drella =

Studio album by Lou Reed and John Cale
- Released: April 23, 1990
- Recorded: December 1989 – January 1990
- Studio: Sigma Sound (New York)
- Genre: Art rock
- Length: 52:54
- Label: Sire
- Producers: Lou Reed; John Cale

Lou Reed chronology
New York (1989)	Songs for Drella (1990)	Magic and Loss (1992)

John Cale chronology
Words for the Dying (1989)	Songs for Drella (1990)	Wrong Way Up (1990)

Songs for Drella is a 1990 studio album by Lou Reed and John Cale, both formerly of the American rock band the Velvet Underground, released on April 11, 1990 by Sire Records. It is a song cycle about Andy Warhol, their mentor and the Velvet Underground's former manager, who had died in 1987. "Drella" was a nickname for Warhol coined by Warhol superstar Ondine as a contraction of Dracula and Cinderella, which was used by Warhol's crowd but never liked by Warhol himself.

== Recording ==
Lou Reed and John Cale spoke to one another for the first time in years at Warhol's memorial service at St. Patrick's Cathedral in New York on April 1, 1987. The painter Julian Schnabel suggested they write a memorial piece for Warhol.

On January 7 and 8, 1989, Cale and Reed performed Songs for Drella at St. Ann's Church in Brooklyn Heights. As Cale was finishing work on his album Words for the Dying and Reed was touring in support of his album New York (both 1989), their collaborative project took another year to complete. The first full version (notably with the inclusion of "A Dream" in one performance) was played on November 29–30, and December 2–3 at the Next Wave Festival at the Brooklyn Academy of Music. On December 4–5, 1989, a live performance—without an audience—was filmed at the Brooklyn Academy of Music, directed by Ed Lachman, and released on VHS and LaserDisc. Over the following two months, Reed and Cale recorded the album at Sigma Sound Studios in New York.

The album focuses on Warhol's interpersonal relations and experiences, with songs falling roughly into three categories: Warhol's first-person perspective, third-person narratives chronicling events and affairs, and first-person commentaries on Warhol by Reed and Cale themselves. The songs, in general, address events in their chronological order.

Songs for Drella was the pair's first full collaborative record since the Velvet Underground's White Light/White Heat (1968), and tensions between them resurfaced during its recording. By the end of recording Cale vowed never to work with Reed again due to personal differences, and plans to support the album with a tour were shelved. Nevertheless, Songs for Drella would prove to be the prelude to a Velvet Underground reunion; after playing songs from the album on June 15, 1990, at a Warhol/Velvet Underground exhibition at the Fondation Cartier pour l'Art Contemporain in Jouy-en-Josas, France, Reed and Cale were joined onstage by their former bandmates Sterling Morrison and Maureen Tucker for a rendition of the Velvet Underground song "Heroin". This was followed by a reunion tour of Europe in 1993, which would be the band's last.

== Critical reception ==
Professional ratings
Review scores
Source	Rating
AllMusic	4.5/5 stars
Chicago Sun-Times	4/4 stars
Chicago Tribune	3.5/4 stars
Entertainment Weekly	B−
Los Angeles Times	3/5 stars
NME	8/10
Q	4/5 stars
Rolling Stone	4/5 stars
Spin	4/5 stars
The Village Voice	A−

Songs for Drella received positive reviews upon release. In a four-star review, Rolling Stone writer Paul Evans stated: "Both nearing fifty, Reed and Cale are the survivors Warhol wasn't fated to become. In popular music, only bluesmen and country greats have managed the maturity these two display." Spin described Songs for Drella as "a moving testament to one of the '60s most important icons" and named it one of their top 20 albums of 1990. Flood Magazine described the album as a "biographical art rock cycle" and noted that it has "its own level of noisy, avant-garde discordance that it reaches with ease and fire—but is also lovely, supple, bittersweet, and equally experimental in its softness".

== Track listing ==
All tracks are written by Lou Reed and John Cale.

Side A
No.	Title	Lead vocals	Length
1.	"Smalltown"	Reed	2:04
2.	"Open House"	Reed	4:18
3.	"Style It Takes"	Cale	2:54
4.	"Work"	Reed	2:38
5.	"Trouble with Classicists"	Cale	3:42
6.	"Starlight"	Reed	3:28
7.	"Faces and Names"	Cale	4:12

Side B
No.	Title	Lead vocals	Length
8.	"Images"	Reed	3:31
9.	"Slip Away (A Warning)"	Reed	3:05
10.	"It Wasn't Me"	Reed	3:30
11.	"I Believe"	Reed	3:18
12.	"Nobody But You"	Reed	3:46
13.	"A Dream"	Cale	6:33
14.	"Forever Changed"	Cale	4:52
15.	"Hello It's Me"	Reed	3:13
Total length:			52:54

=== Singles ===
- "Nobody But You" b/w "Style It Takes" – 7" Germany 1990
- "Nobody But You"; "Style It Takes" b/w "A Dream" – 12" & CD-single Germany 1990

== Personnel ==
- John Cale – vocals, keyboards, viola
- Lou Reed – vocals, guitar

== Charts ==
Chart performance for Songs for Drella
Chart (1990)	Peak position
Australian Albums (ARIA)	100
Austrian Albums (Ö3 Austria)	28
Dutch Albums (Album Top 100)	14
German Albums (Offizielle Top 100)	28
New Zealand Albums (RMNZ)	42
Swedish Albums (Sverigetopplistan)	43
Swiss Albums (Schweizer Hitparade)	18
UK Albums (Official Charts)	22
US Billboard 200	103
