= The Raven (Lou Reed album) =

Studio album by Lou Reed
- Released: January 28, 2003
- Recorded: 2002
- Studio: Various: Sear Sound, New York City; Clinton Recording Studio, New York; Cove City Sound Studios, New York; The Looking Glass Studios, New York; Roof Recording, New York
- Genre: Rock; experimental rock; acoustic rock; spoken word
- Length: 125:04 (2-disc edition) 74:59 (1-disc edition)
- Label: Sire
- Producer: Lou Reed, Hal Willner

Lou Reed chronology
Legendary Lou Reed (2002)	The Raven (2003)	Animal Serenade (2004)

Professional ratings
Aggregate scores
Source	Rating
Metacritic	54/100
Review scores
Source	Rating
AllMusic	3.5/5 stars
Blender	2/5 stars
Christgau’s Consumer Guide	B+
Entertainment Weekly	C−
The Guardian	4/5 stars
Q	3/5 stars
Rolling Stone	3/5 stars
Mojo	3.5/5 stars
NME	6/10
Pitchfork	2.0/10

The Raven is the nineteenth solo studio album by American rock musician Lou Reed, released on January 28, 2003 by Sire Records. It is a concept album, recounting the short stories and poems of Edgar Allan Poe through word and song, and was based on his 2000 opera co-written with Robert Wilson, POEtry.

The Raven features new and very different versions of two songs that Reed had released on earlier albums: "Perfect Day" (originally found on 1972's Transformer) and "The Bed" (from 1973's Berlin). In addition to Reed, the album features a number of guest vocalists including Laurie Anderson, David Bowie, Anohni Hegarty, Steve Buscemi and Willem Dafoe. The co-producer of the album, Hal Willner, had previously overseen the Poe tribute album Closed on Account of Rabies.

The recording was simultaneously released as a two-disc set of recordings and in an edited single-disc version. Painter and filmmaker Julian Schnabel created the cover. The Raven would prove to be the final solo rock album by Reed, as 2007's Hudson River Wind Meditations consisted entirely of meditational new-age music, and 2011's Lulu was a collaborative rock album with heavy metal band Metallica.

== Track listing ==
All tracks written by Lou Reed.

=== Limited edition double CD set ===
==== Disc 1: Act 1: The Play ====
1. "The Conqueror Worm"
2. "Overture"
3. "Old Poe"
4. "Prologue (Ligeia)"
5. "Edgar Allan Poe"
6. "The Valley of Unrest"
7. "Call on Me"
8. "The City in the Sea/Shadow"
9. "A Thousand Departed Friends"
10. "Change"
11. "The Fall of the House of Usher"
12. "The Bed"
13. "Perfect Day"
14. "The Raven"
15. "Balloon"

==== Disc 2: Act 2 ====
1. "Broadway Song"
2. "The Tell-Tale Heart (Pt. 1)"
3. "Blind Rage"
4. "The Tell-Tale Heart (Pt. 2)"
5. "Burning Embers"
6. "Imp of the Perverse"
7. "Vanishing Act"
8. "The Cask"
9. "Guilty", spoken
10. "Guilty", sung
11. "A Wild Being from Birth"
12. "I Wanna Know (The Pit and the Pendulum)"
13. "Science of the Mind"
14. "Annabel Lee – The Bells"
15. "Hop Frog"
16. "Every Frog Has His Day"
17. "Tripitena's Speech"
18. "Who Am I? (Tripitena's Song)"
19. "Courtly Orangutans"
20. "Fire Music"
21. "Guardian Angel"

=== 1 CD edition ===
1. "Overture"
2. "Edgar Allan Poe"
3. "Call on Me"
4. "The Valley of Unrest"
5. "A Thousand Departed Friends"
6. "Change"
7. "The Bed"
8. "Perfect Day"
9. "The Raven"
10. "Balloon"
11. "Broadway Song"
12. "Blind Rage"
13. "Burning Embers"
14. "Vanishing Act"
15. "Guilty"
16. "I Wanna Know (The Pit and the Pendulum)"
17. "Science of the Mind"
18. "Hop Frog"
19. "Tripitena's Speech"
20. "Who Am I? (Tripitena's Song)"
21. "Guardian Angel"

== Personnel ==
Adapted from The Raven liner notes.

Musicians

- Lou Reed – vocals; guitar
- Mike Rathke – guitar
- Fernando Saunders – bass; guitar; backing vocals
- Tony "Thunder" Smith – drums
- Friedrich Paravicini – piano; keyboards
- Jane Scarpantoni – cello; string arrangement
- Doug Wieselman – baritone; tenor saxophone
- Paul Shapiro – tenor saxophone
- Steve Bernstein – trumpet; horn arrangement
- Art Baron – trombone on "Broadway Song"
- Ornette Coleman – alto saxophone on "Guilty"
- Frank Wulff – oboe; hurdy-gurdy on "Overture" and "The Fall of the House of Usher"
- Kate & Anna McGarrigle – vocals on "Balloon"
- Antoine Silverman – violin
- Marti Sweet – violin
- Patrick Carroll – bass; drum programming on "Who Am I? (Tripitena's Song)"
- Shelly Woodworth – English horn on "Who Am I? (Tripitena's Song)"
- Russ DeSalvo – guitar; keyboards on "Who Am I? (Tripitena's Song)"
- Rob Mathes – string arrangement on "Who Am I? (Tripitena's Song)"
- Laurie Anderson – vocals on "Call on Me"
- Anohni Hegarty – vocals on "Perfect Day"; backing vocals
- David Bowie – vocals on "Hop Frog"
- The Blind Boys of Alabama – backing vocals on "I Wanna Know (The Pit and the Pendulum)"
- Willem Dafoe – voice on "The Conqueror Worm", "The City In The Sea/Shadow", "The Fall of The House of Usher", "The Raven","The Tell-Tale Heart Pt. 1","The Tell-Tale Heart Pt. 2", "The Cask" "Every Frog Has His Day", "Courtly Orangutans" and "Prologue (Ligeia)"
- Steve Buscemi – voice on, "Old Poe", "The City In The Sea/Shadow", "Broadway Song", "The Tell-Tale Heart Pt. 1", "The Tell-Tale Heart Pt. 2", "Imp Of The Perverse", and "The Cask"
- Elizabeth Ashley – voice on "The City In The Sea/Shadow", "The Valley of Unrest", "The Fall of The House of Usher", "A Wild Being From Birth", & "Guilty (Spoken)"
- Amanda Plummer – voice on "The City In The Sea/Shadow", "Annabel Lee/The Bells", "Every Frog Has His Day", "Tripitena's Speech" and "Courtly Orangutans"
- Fisher Stevens – voice on "The Fall of The House of Usher", "The Tell-Tale Heart Pt. 1", "The Tell-Tale Heart Pt. 2", "Every Frog Has His Day" and "Courtly Orangutans"
- Kate Valk – voice on "The Tell-Tale Heart Pt. 1", "The Tell-Tale Heart Pt. 2", "Imp Of The Perverse" "Guilty (Spoken)", and "A Wild Being From Birth"

Production and artwork

- Lou Reed – producer; mixing; recording
- Hal Willner – producer
- Ric Wake – production on "Who Am I? (Tripitena's Song)"
- Tim Latham – recording; mixing
- Aaron Franz – additional recording
- Jim Monti – additional recording
- Julian Schnabel – design; photography
