= Legendary Hearts =

Studio album by Lou Reed
- Released: March 1983
- Recorded: 1982
- Studio: RCA (New York City)
- Genre: Rock
- Length: 38:10
- Label: RCA Victor
- Producer: Lou Reed

Lou Reed chronology
The Blue Mask (1982)	Legendary Hearts (1983)	Live in Italy (1984)

Lou Reed studio album chronology
The Blue Mask (1982)	Legendary Hearts (1983)	New Sensations (1984)

Legendary Hearts is the twelfth solo studio album by American rock musician Lou Reed, released in March 1983 by RCA Records. Reed produced the album, and dedicated it to his then-wife, Sylvia, who was credited with the cover concept. Due to tensions with Reed, most of Robert Quine's guitar parts were mixed down or removed entirely.

Legendary Hearts peaked at No. 159 on the U.S. Billboard 200 chart.

== Recording ==
Robert Quine later said of his work with Reed, "The atmosphere was really uptight – it's impossible to be friends with him. When I got the final mix, I was really freaked out. He pretty much mixed me off the record. I was in Ohio and took it out in the driveway and smashed the tape into pieces... I have cassettes of the rough mix of the record and it was a really good record but he made it all muddy and murky."

== Critical reception ==
Professional ratings
Review scores
Source	Rating
AllMusic	4/5 stars
The Boston Phoenix	4/4 stars
Chicago Tribune	4/4 stars
Pitchfork	6.9/10
Record Collector	3/5 stars
Rolling Stone	4/5 stars
The Rolling Stone Album Guide	4.5/5 stars
Smash Hits	8/10
Spin Alternative Record Guide	8/10
The Village Voice	A

Upon release, Legendary Hearts received favorable reviews from music critics. Writing for The Village Voice, music journalist Robert Christgau said that "if The Blue Mask was a tonic, the follow-up's a long drink of water, trading impact and intensity for the stated goal of this (final?) phase of Reed's music: continuity, making do, the long haul." NME critic Cynthia Rose wrote that Legendary Hearts was "possibly the purest, most fluid and spiritual musical unity you'll hear in rock and roll for some time to come – with Reed's cleansed, declamatory vocals well up front".

Robert Palmer of The New York Times praised Legendary Hearts as "a song cycle without any outstanding weak links... All the songs are personal, from the domestic still-life portrait 'Rooftop Garden' to 'Bottoming Out' and 'The Last Shot,' powerful confrontations between Lou Reed the loving husband and Lou Reed the self-destructive monster. The only villain on Legendary Hearts is Lou Reed, but because he has confronted his own defects as bravely as he once confronted the decadence around him, he is also the album's hero. The two Lou Reeds have finally become one."

Ira Robbins of Trouser Press wrote that the album "ranks with any Reed record all the way back to the Velvets in substance and stands out as his strongest work in style, using the group as a powerful lens that magnifies his themes and obsessions down to the finest detail."

Legendary Hearts placed seventh in The Village Voice's annual Pazz & Jop critics' poll.

In a retrospective review for AllMusic, critic Mark Deming wrote, "On Legendary Hearts, Reed was writing great songs, playing them with enthusiasm and imagination, and singing them with all his heart and soul, and if it wasn't his best album, it was more than good enough to confirm that the brilliance of The Blue Mask was no fluke, and that Reed had reestablished himself as one of the most important artists in American rock."

== Track listing ==
All tracks are written by Lou Reed.

Side one
No.	Title	Length
1.	"Legendary Hearts"	3:23
2.	"Don't Talk to Me About Work"	2:07
3.	"Make Up Mind"	2:48
4.	"Martial Law"	3:53
5.	"The Last Shot"	3:22
6.	"Turn Out the Light"	2:45

Side two
No.	Title	Length
1.	"Pow Wow"	2:30
2.	"Betrayed"	3:10
3.	"Bottoming Out"	3:40
4.	"Home of the Brave"	6:49
5.	"Rooftop Garden"	3:04
Total length:		38:10

== Personnel ==
Credits are adapted from the Legendary Hearts liner notes.

Musicians

- Lou Reed – vocals; guitar
- Robert Quine – guitar
- Fred Maher – drums
- Fernando Saunders – bass guitar

Production and artwork

- Lou Reed – producer
- Corky Stasiak – engineer
- Jim Crotty – associate engineer
- Greg Calbi – mastering
- Waring Abbott – photography; art direction
- Sylvia Reed – cover concept

== Chart performance ==
Chart	Peak position
French Albums (SNEP)	67
Swedish Albums (Sverigetopplistan)	36
US Billboard 200	159

== See also ==
- List of albums released in 1983
- Lou Reed discography
