= New York (album) =

Studio album by Lou Reed
- Released: January 10, 1989
- Recorded: May–October 1988
- Studios: Mediasound Studio B, New York City
- Genre: Rock
- Length: 56:55
- Label: Sire
- Producers: Lou Reed; Fred Maher

Lou Reed chronology
| Mistrial (1986) | New York (1989) | Songs for Drella (1990) |

Singles from New York
- 1. "Romeo Had Juliette" Released: February 1989 (US); 2. "Dirty Blvd." Released: February 1989; 3. "Busload of Faith" Released: 1989

New York is the fifteenth solo studio album by American rock musician Lou Reed, released in January 1989 by Sire Records.

The album received universal critical acclaim upon release, and is widely considered to be among Reed's strongest solo efforts. It is highly regarded for the strength and force of its lyrical content; Reed stated that he required simple music so that it would not distract from his frank lyrics. The single "Dirty Blvd." was a number-one hit on the newly created Billboard Modern Rock Tracks chart for four weeks.

Reed's former band, the Velvet Underground, were at the peak of their cult popularity in the late 1980s, but his solo career had hit several lows during the 1980s. The widespread popularity of New York reignited his career to the extent the Velvet Underground were revived for a world tour.

Velvet Underground drummer Moe Tucker played percussion on two tracks.

== Background and lyrics ==
Reed's straightforward rock and roll sound on this album was unusual for the time and along with other releases such as Graham Parker's The Mona Lisa's Sister presaged a back-to-basics turn in mainstream rock music. Conversely, the lyrics through the 14 songs are profuse and carefully woven, making New York Reed's most overtly conceptual album since the early 1970s. His polemical liner notes direct the listener to hear the 57-minute album in one sitting, "as though it were a book or a movie." The lyrics vent anger at many public figures in the news at the time. Reed mentions by name the Virgin Mary, the NRA, Rudy Giuliani, "the President", "the mayor", the "Statue of Bigotry", Buddha, Mike Tyson, Bernard Goetz, Donald Trump, "Mr. Waldheim", "the Pontiff", Jesse Jackson, Jimi Hendrix, Jimmy Swaggart, Louis Farrakhan, Oliver North, Richard Secord (misidentified as "William Secord"), and Morton Downey.

Reed also drew inspiration from some of his friends and fellow artists. For instance, in the song "Last Great American Whale", Reed quotes John Mellencamp, referring to him as "my painter friend Donald." Upon hearing the album, Mellencamp himself said, "Yeah, it sounds like it was produced by an eighth-grader, but I like it."

== Artwork ==
The cover art is a photograph with five different shots of Reed superimposed on the same street scene. The rear photo is the same street scene without Reed. The street is lit from the right hand side, while the photos of Reed are all lit from the left. Photography is credited to Waring Abbott. The album design was done by Spencer Drate, Judith Salavetz, and Sylvia Reed.

== Critical reception ==
Professional ratings
Review scores
| Source | Rating |
|---|---|
| AllMusic | 5/5 stars |
| Chicago Tribune | 4/4 stars |
| Mojo | 4/5 stars |
| NME | 10/10 |
| Pitchfork | 8.7/10 |
| Q | 5/5 stars |
| Rolling Stone | 4/5 stars |
| Spin | 4.5/5 stars |
| Uncut | 8/10 |
| The Village Voice | A− |

Reviewing New York for Rolling Stone, Anthony DeCurtis described the album's songs as "fierce, poetic journalism" and found that Reed shows a newfound "political outlook that grounds his work and lessens his characteristic detachment", concluding that "whenever anyone wants to hear the sound of the Eighties collapsing into the Nineties in the city of dreams, New York is where they'll have to go." NME critic Gavin Martin said that the album's simple rock and roll sound complements Reed's "often condemnatory" lyrics, which Martin felt displayed "personal insight, invective and, most telling, a profound compassion for his characters and their place in the scheme of things." New York was voted the third best album of the year in The Village Voice's annual Pazz & Jop critics' poll for 1989. New Musical Express also voted New York the third best album of 1989 on their critics' list for that year. "Whether or not you buy Reed's line about New York being a single integrated experience 'like a book or a movie'," remarked Q in its end-of-year round-up, "this is indisputably one of the landmark albums of an inconsistently brilliant career."

In a 1995 reappraisal, Q's Bill Prince noted that New York "signalled the beginning of the defrosting of Reed's Velvet Underground past that has so far marked out his '90s." Mark Deming wrote in his review for AllMusic that "New York is a masterpiece of literate, adult rock & roll, and the finest album of Reed's solo career." In a retrospective overview of Reed's discography for Spin, David Marchese stated that the album had a "mix of sharp detail, righteous anger, and razor-wire rock" and "was Reed's best of the decade." Writing in 2020 for Pitchfork, Daniel Felsenthal called New York "a record of unmistakable conviction, one so direct and literary, erudite and rageful that it resembles no protest music written before or since." Felsenthal stated, "The city of his birth becomes his Yoknapatawpha County, a location for synecdoches that encompass large swatches of experience. Like much great fiction, Reed's handling of his themes—a depleted environment, indigenous persecution, pro-lifers, police killings, racial violence—has aged into greater relevance today."

In 1989, Rolling Stone ranked New York the 19th best album of the 1980s. In 2006, Q listed it as the decade's 26th best album. In 2012, Slant Magazine placed the record at No. 70 on its list of the 100 best albums of the 1980s.

== Other releases ==
Reed performed all the tracks on New York in order on August 13, 1989, at Théâtre Saint-Denis in Montreal, Canada, and this performance was recorded and released as a DVD entitled The New York Album. The DVD also contains an audio-only interview with Lou Reed ("A Conversation with Lou Reed").

In September 2020, a deluxe box set version of New York was released, containing the remastered album on both CD and a two-record set, plus a second CD of previously unreleased live versions from Reed's 1989 tour, a third CD of song demos, alternate mixes, one unreleased song from the album sessions, and two live encore recordings, and a DVD of the Montreal performance.

== Track listing ==
All tracks are written by Lou Reed, except as indicated.

Side one
| No. | Title | Writer(s) | Length |
|---|---|---|---|
| 1. | "Romeo Had Juliette" | | 3:09 |
| 2. | "Halloween Parade" | | 3:33 |
| 3. | "Dirty Blvd." | | 3:29 |
| 4. | "Endless Cycle" | | 4:01 |
| 5. | "There Is No Time" | | 3:45 |
| 6. | "Last Great American Whale" | | 3:42 |
| 7. | "Beginning of a Great Adventure" | Lou Reed; Mike Rathke | 4:57 |

Side two
| No. | Title | Length |
|---|---|---|
| 8. | "Busload of Faith" | 4:50 |
| 9. | "Sick of You" | 3:25 |
| 10. | "Hold On" | 3:24 |
| 11. | "Good Evening Mr. Waldheim" | 4:35 |
| 12. | "Xmas in February" | 2:55 |
| 13. | "Strawman" | 5:54 |
| 14. | "Dime Store Mystery" | 5:01 |
| Total length: | | 56:40 |

Deluxe box set CD 2
| No. | Title | Writer(s) | Length |
|---|---|---|---|
| 1. | "Romeo Had Juliette" (live at the Warner Theatre, Washington, D.C., 3/14/1989) | | 4:44 |
| 2. | "Halloween Parade" (live at the Joseph Meyerhoff Symphony Hall, Baltimore, MD, 3/16/1989) | | 4:51 |
| 3. | "Dirty Blvd." (live at the Wembley Arena, London, UK, 7/14/1989) | | 4:18 |
| 4. | "Endless Cycle" (live at the Warner Theatre, Washington, DC, 3/14/1989) | | 4:38 |
| 5. | "There Is No Time" (live at the Mosque, Richmond, VA, 8/8/1989) | | 5:35 |
| 6. | "Last Great American Whale" (live at the Mosque, Richmond, VA, 8/8/1989) | | 6:05 |
| 7. | "Beginning of a Great Adventure" (live at the Wembley Arena, London, UK, 7/14/1989) | Lou Reed; Mike Rathke | 7:23 |
| 8. | "Busload of Faith" (live at the Falconer Theatre, Copenhagen, Denmark, 6/8/1989) | | 5:05 |
| 9. | "Sick of You" (live at the Tower Theatre, Upper Darby Township, PA, 3/17/1989) | | 5:21 |
| 10. | "Hold On" (live at the Mosque, Richmond, VA, 8/8/1989) | | 3:34 |
| 11. | "Good Evening Mr. Waldheim" (live at the Joseph Meyerhoff Symphony Hall, Baltimore, MD, 3/16/1989) | | 4:01 |
| 12. | "Xmas in February" (live at the Joseph Meyerhoff Symphony Hall, Baltimore, MD, 3/16/1989) | | 3:43 |
| 13. | "Strawman" (live at the Wembley Arena, London, UK, 7/14/1989) | | 5:21 |
| 14. | "Dime Store Mystery" (live at the Mosque, Richmond, VA, 8/8/1989) | | 6:22 |

Deluxe box set CD 3
| No. | Title | Writer(s) | Length |
|---|---|---|---|
| 1. | "Romeo Had Juliette" (single version) | | 3:07 |
| 2. | "Dirty Blvd." (work tape) | | 1:54 |
| 3. | "Dirty Blvd." (rough mix) | | 3:35 |
| 4. | "Endless Cycle" (work tape) | | 1:06 |
| 5. | "Last Great American Whale" (work tape) | | 2:09 |
| 6. | "Beginning of a Great Adventure" (rough mix) | Lou Reed; Mike Rathke | 5:02 |
| 7. | "Busload of Faith" (acoustic version) | | 2:40 |
| 8. | "Sick of You" (work tape) | | 1:26 |
| 9. | "Sick of You" (rough mix) | | 3:40 |
| 10. | "Hold On" (rough mix) | | 2:44 |
| 11. | "Strawman" (rough mix) | | 5:59 |
| 12. | "The Room" | Lou Reed; Mike Rathke | 3:37 |
| 13. | "Sweet Jane" (live encore at the Mosque, Richmond, VA, 8/8/1989) | | 5:51 |
| 14. | "Walk on the Wild Side" (live at the Mosque, Richmond, VA, 8/8/1989) | | 3:57 |

== Personnel ==
Adapted from the New York liner notes.

Musicians

- Lou Reed – lead and background vocals, guitar
- Mike Rathke – guitar
- Rob Wasserman – electric upright bass
- Fred Maher – drums on all songs except "Last Great American Whale" and "Dime Store Mystery", bass guitar on "Romeo Had Juliette" and "Busload of Faith"
- Moe Tucker – percussion on "Last Great American Whale" and "Dime Store Mystery"
- Dion DiMucci – backing vocals on "Dirty Blvd."
- Jeffrey Lesser – backing vocals

Production and artwork

- Lou Reed – production, mixing
- Fred Maher – production, engineering, mixing
- Jeffrey Lesser – engineering, mixing
- Victor Deyglio – engineering (assistant)
- Mike Rathke – mixing
- Bob Ludwig – mastering
- Spencer Drate – art direction/design
- Waring Abbott – photography
- Sylvia Reed – concept art, creative direction

== Charts ==
Weekly chart performance for New York
| Chart (1989–1990) | Peak position |
|---|---|
| Australian Albums (ARIA) | 25 |
| Austrian Albums (Ö3 Austria) | 8 |
| Dutch Albums (Album Top 100) | 11 |
| German Albums (Offizielle Top 100) | 19 |
| New Zealand Albums (RMNZ) | 17 |
| Norwegian Albums (VG-lista) | 12 |
| Swedish Albums (Sverigetopplistan) | 9 |
| Swiss Albums (Schweizer Hitparade) | 1 |
| UK Albums (Official Charts) | 14 |
| US Billboard 200 | 40 |

| Chart (2020–2021) | Peak position |
|---|---|
| Belgian Albums (Ultratop Flanders) | 135 |
| Belgian Albums (Ultratop Wallonia) | 161 |
| Hungarian Albums (Mahasz) | 33 |

== Sales and certifications ==
| Region | Certification | Certified units/sales |
|---|---|---|
| Australia (ARIA) | Platinum | 70,000^{^} |
| France (SNEP) | Gold | 100,000^{*} |
| Netherlands (NVPI) | Gold | 50,000^{^} |
| Spain (Promusicae) | Gold | 50,000^{^} |
| Switzerland (IFPI Switzerland) | Gold | 25,000^{^} |
| United Kingdom (BPI) | Gold | 100,000^{^} |
| United States (RIAA) | Gold | 500,000^{^} |
^{*} Sales figures based on certification alone.^{^} Shipments figures based on certification alone.
