= Fernando Saunders =

American singer

- Born: January 17, 1957 (age 69); Detroit, Michigan, U.S.
- Genre: Rock
- Occupations: Musician; singer; record producer
- Instruments: Bass guitar; guitar; keyboards; vocals
- Website: fernandosaunders.net

Fernando Saunders (born 17 January 1957) is an American musician, singer and record producer from Detroit, Michigan. He is perhaps best known for his longtime partnership with rock musician Lou Reed, from 1982 to 1987 and again from 1996 to 2008.

== Biography ==
Fernando Saunders has performed all around the world with notable artists such as Marianne Faithfull, Joan Baez, Slash, Gavin Friday, Tori Amos, Pat Benatar, Steve Winwood, Jimmy Page, John McLaughlin, Heart, Jan Hammer, Luciano Pavarotti, Eric Clapton, Jeff Beck, Ron Wood and Charlie Watts from the Rolling Stones, Robert Quine, Anohni, Steve Hunter, Kevin Hearn, Julieta Venegas, Grayson Hugh and Suzanne Vega. He is also a long-time collaborator with Kip Hanrahan Special EFX and Lou Reed (as a bass player, vocalist and producer).

=== Personal life ===
Fernando's son, András Kállay-Saunders (born January 28, 1985) represented Hungary in the 2014 edition of the Eurovision Song Contest with the song "Running".

Fernando's daughter, Marisa Saunders (born September 16, 1996), is also a bassist in the band No Vacation.

== Selected discography ==
=== Solo ===
- Cashmere Dreams (1989; Grudge/BMG)
- The Spin (1993; A&M)
- I Will Break Your Fall (2006; Summit/Sony Red7)
- Plant a Seed (2011; EMI)
- Happiness (2012; Videoradio)

=== with Larry Young ===
- Fuel (1975)

=== with Jan Hammer ===
- Oh Yeah? (1976)
- Melodies (1977)
- Black Sheep (1979)

=== with Jeff Beck ===
- Jeff Beck with the Jan Hammer Group Live (1977)

=== with John McLaughlin ===
- Electric Guitarist (1978)
- Electric Dreams (1979)

=== with Pat Benatar ===
- Wide Awake in Dreamland (1988)

=== with Grayson Hugh ===
- Blind To Reason (1988; RCA)

=== with Deborah Henson-Conant ===
- Caught in the Act (1990)
- Talking Hands (1991)

=== with Heart ===
- The Road Home (1995)

=== with George Jinda ===
- Between Dreams (1995)

=== with Special EFX ===
- Special EFX (1984)
- Just Like Magic (1990)
- Peace of the World (1991)
- Global Village (1992)
- Here To Stay (1996)
- Masterpiece (1999)

=== with Chieli Minucci ===
- Renaissance (1995)
- Sweet on You (2000)

=== with Kip Hanrahan ===
- Tenderness (1990)
- Piñero Soundtrack (2002)
- Beautiful Scars (2007)

=== with Lou Reed ===
- The Blue Mask (1982)
- Legendary Hearts (1983)
- Live in Italy (1984)
- New Sensations (1984)
- Mistrial (1986)
- Set the Twilight Reeling (1996)
- Perfect Night: Live in London (1998)
- Ecstasy (2000)
- The Raven (2003)
- Animal Serenade (2004)
- Berlin: Live at St. Ann's Warehouse (2008)

== Film ==
- A Night with Lou Reed (1983)
- Coney Island Baby: Live in Jersey (Lou Reed) (1987)
- Lou Reed: Rock and Roll Heart (1998)
- Lou Reed: Live at Montreux (2000)
- Prozac Nation (2001)
- Spanish Fly: Lou Reed Live in Spain (2005)
- Berlin: Live at St. Ann's Warehouse (Lou Reed-Julian Schnabel) (2008)
- CZizinci (2011)
