= Lou Reed (album) =

Studio album by Lou Reed
- Released: May 1972
- Recorded: December 1971 – January 1972
- Studios: Morgan (Willesden, London)
- Genres: Rock; art rock
- Length: 38:08
- Label: RCA Victor
- Producers: Richard Robinson; Lou Reed

Lou Reed chronology
Lou Reed (1972)	Transformer (1972)

Lou Reed is the debut solo studio album by American rock musician Lou Reed, released in May 1972 by RCA Records, two years after he left the Velvet Underground. It was produced by Richard Robinson and Reed and features London session musicians as Reed's backing band, two of whom, Rick Wakeman and Steve Howe, were from the British progressive rock band Yes. Wakeman recalled that during the recording sessions, "the lights had to be out so nobody could see." The album was recorded at Morgan Studios in London, between December 1971 and January 1972.

With increasing interest in the Velvet Underground, Reed's debut album was highly anticipated, but was a commercial and critical disappointment, reaching only No. 189 on the Billboard 200. It comprises eight new recordings of then-unreleased Velvet Underground songs, and two new songs, "Going Down" and "Berlin" (the latter was re-recorded by Reed as the title track for his 1973 album Berlin).

In 1976, when asked what he thought of the album in retrospect, Reed stated, "It's got some of the best songs I ever wrote, but the production sucks."

== Critical reception ==
Professional ratings
Review scores
Source	Rating
AllMusic	3/5 stars
Chicago Tribune	3/4 stars
Christgau's Record Guide	B+
MusicHound Rock: The Essential Album Guide	2.5/5 stars
The Rolling Stone Album Guide	3/5 stars
(The New) Rolling Stone Album Guide	4/5 stars

The Commercial Appeal wrote that the album "contains some of the frenzy for which his former band was noted, but most of the music is toned down into a more standard rock mold." The Buffalo News determined that Reed's "blunt, almost over-simplified lyrics and the pre-Clapton guitar sound melt into a peculiarly satisfying experience."

The Rolling Stone Album Guide noted the "genteel art-rock treatment" of the songs written during Reed's Velvet Underground years.

== Track listing ==
All tracks are written by Lou Reed.

Side one
No.	Title	Length
1.	"I Can't Stand It"	2:34
2.	"Going Down"	2:53
3.	"Walk and Talk It"	3:38
4.	"Lisa Says"	5:29
5.	"Berlin"	5:13
Total length:		19:47

Side two
No.	Title	Length
1.	"I Love You"	2:16
2.	"Wild Child"	4:39
3.	"Love Makes You Feel"	3:09
4.	"Ride into the Sun"	3:13
5.	"Ocean"	5:04
Total length:		18:21

== Cross-reference ==
Eight tracks from Lou Reed were, at one point, originally performed by the Velvet Underground. These recordings have been released on various compilations and live albums, which have been catalogued below.

Title	Original Velvet Underground release	Notes
"I Can't Stand It"	1969: The Velvet Underground Live, VU	Additional verse on Lou Reed version.
"Walk and Talk It"	Peel Slowly and See, Loaded (Fully Loaded Edition)	Different lyrics and added musical sections on Lou Reed version. The Velvet Underground version is titled "Walk and Talk".
"Lisa Says"	1969, VU	Extended version with different lyrics on Lou Reed version.
"I Love You"	Peel Slowly and See, Loaded (Fully Loaded Edition)	---
"Wild Child"	---	No Velvet Underground recording has surfaced yet, but the song is known to have been played live in 1970. However, the song was performed by Lou Reed and John Cale at the Bataclan 1972 concert in Paris with Nico, and can be heard on the Velvet Underground bootleg Ultra Rare Tracks Vol. 2, which features Lou Reed playing the song with an acoustic guitar into a tape recorder.
"Love Makes You Feel"	Loaded (Fully Loaded Edition)	The Velvet Underground version is titled "Love Makes You Feel Ten Foot Tall".
"Ride into the Sun"	Another View, What Goes On, Loaded (Fully Loaded Edition), Bootleg Series Volume 1: The Quine Tapes	Lou Reed version is similar to the versions found on Loaded (Fully Loaded Edition) and The Quine Tapes. Earlier versions of the song can be found on Another View and What Goes On.
"Ocean"	1969, VU, Loaded (Fully Loaded Edition)	The version on Lou Reed is closest to the version found on Loaded (Fully Loaded Edition).

== Tour ==
On the album's tour, which lasted two legs between June 9 and November 2, 1972, Reed was backed by the Tots. The Tots featured no shared personnel with the album and consisted of Vinny Laporta and Eddie Reynolds on guitar, Bobby Resigno on bass guitar, and Scottie Clark on drums. This backing group would also play on the Transformer tour and perform on the live album American Poet (2001).

Date	Venue	Notes
First Leg
June 9, 1972	Millard Fillmore Room, University of Buffalo, NY	
June 10, 1972	Millard Fillmore Room, University of Buffalo, NY	
July 8, 1972	Festival Hall, London, England	Guest spot with David Bowie
July 14, 1972	Scala Cinema, King's Cross, London, England	
July 22, 1972	Wimbledon Town Hall, England	
July 27, 1972	Polytechnic, Manchester, England	
July 28, 1972	Scala Cinema, King's Cross, London, England	
July 29, 1972	Friar's Club, Aylesbury, England	
July 30, 1972	The Greyhound, Croydon, England	
Second Leg
September 27, 1972	Manchester Polytechnic Union, Manchester, England	
September 29, 1972	Edmonton Sundown, London, England	
September 30, 1972	Amsterdam, the Netherlands	
October 6, 1972	St. Andrew's University, Scotland	
October 7, 1972	Glasgow University, Glasgow, Scotland	
October 13, 1972	Cambridge University, Cambridge, England	
October 14, 1972	Leicester University, Leicester, England	
October 19, 1972	University Stadium, Liverpool, England	
October 20, 1972	Essex University, Essex, England	
October 21, 1972	Imperial College, London, England	
October 22, 1972	HardRock Concert Theatre, Manchester, England	
October 25, 1972	Oxford Polytechnic, Oxford, England	
October 26, 1972	Alhambra Rock Theatre, Birmingham, England	
October 27, 1972	Leeds Polytechnic, Leeds, England	
October 28, 1972	Kingston Polytechnic, Kingston, England	
October 29, 1972	Southampton Guildhall, Southampton, England	
October 30, 1972	Civic Hall, Dunstable, England	
November 1, 1972	Mile End Sundown, London, England	
November 2, 1972	Pheasantry Club, London, England	

== Personnel ==
Credits are adapted from the Lou Reed liner notes.

Musicians

- Lou Reed – vocals, guitar
- Caleb Quaye – electric and acoustic guitars, piano
- Steve Howe – electric guitar
- Paul Keogh – electric and acoustic guitars
- Rick Wakeman – piano
- Les Hurdle – bass guitar
- Brian Odgers – bass guitar
- Clem Cattini – percussion
- Kay Garner – harmony vocals
- Helene Francois – harmony vocals

Production and artwork

- Richard Robinson – producer
- Lou Reed – producer
- Mike Bobak – engineer
- Tom Adams – cover art
- Ronn Campisi – back liner photograph

== Charts ==
Chart (1972)	Peak position
US Billboard Top LPs	189
