= The Blue Mask =

Studio album by Lou Reed
- Released: February 1982
- Recorded: October 1981
- Studio: RCA, New York City
- Genre: Rock
- Length: 41:00
- Label: RCA Victor
- Producer: Lou Reed; Sean Fullan

Lou Reed chronology
Rock and Roll Diary: 1967–1980 (1980)	The Blue Mask (1982)	Legendary Hearts (1983)

The Blue Mask is the eleventh solo studio album by the American rock musician Lou Reed, released in February 1982, by RCA Records. Reed had returned to the label after having left Arista Records. The album was released around Reed's 40th birthday, and covers topics of marriage and settling down, alongside themes of violence, paranoia, and alcoholism.

== Production and recording ==
Reed and Robert Quine's guitars were mixed separately in the right and left stereo channels respectively. To differentiate his guitar's sound from Reed's, Quine used D tuning, playing each song as if it was one major second higher. For example, "Heavenly Arms" is in G major, so Quine used fingerings for A major to play the song.

Quine, who years earlier followed the Velvet Underground across the country and taped several of their early shows (they were later released as Bootleg Series Volume 1: The Quine Tapes), made for a suitable complement to Reed. Quine also toured in support of the album and can be seen on the recorded The Bottom Line show titled A Night with Lou Reed (1983). Quine later described the album as, "a record that I'm particularly proud of. We had never played together before going into the studio. There were no rehearsals and most of it was done in one or two takes. I like all the things that I've done with Lou but that will always be special for me." Quine and Reed share the distinction of being named to Rolling Stone's Top 100 Guitarists of All-Time List.

Fernando Saunders, who subsequently became a longtime Reed collaborator, plays bass guitar and adds backing vocals (most noticeably, a falsetto refrain in the outro to "Heavenly Arms") to this album and can also be seen in A Night with Lou Reed. Saunders later said, "it was like a dream come true. Lou wanted me to play the things no one would ever let me play, the things I would sit in my bedroom and play. Suddenly I was glad I hadn't quit music for my uncle's insurance company."

The album contains no instrumental overdubs with the exception of Reed's guitar on "My House", but all vocals were overdubbed with the exception of "The Heroine". The drummer for the album was studio musician Doane Perry, who later joined Jethro Tull.

The album cover was designed by Reed's then wife, Sylvia, and features a blue version of a photograph by Mick Rock from the cover art of 1972's Transformer.

In 2000, a remastered version of The Blue Mask was released.

== Critical reception ==
Professional ratings
Review scores
Source	Rating
AllMusic	4.5/5 stars
Chicago Tribune	4/4 stars
Christgau's Record Guide	A
The Encyclopedia of Popular Music	3/5 stars
Pitchfork	9.2/10
Rolling Stone	5/5 stars
(The New) Rolling Stone Album Guide	4.5/5 stars
Spin	4/5 stars
Spin Alternative Record Guide	9/10

Robert Palmer of The New York Times hailed it as the year's "most outstanding rock album," writing that Reed had finally matched the "hard, thoughtful, unflinching songs" of the Velvet Underground's groundbreaking debut from 1967. He also praised the musicianship, particularly Reed and Quine's guitar work, writing that they "interact with a sort of empathy and lucidity one expects from a seasoned jazz combo and the music always reaches out to invite the listener in, even at its most intensely personal level."

Robert Christgau of The Village Voice initially gave The Blue Mask an A+ rating: "Never has Lou sounded more Ginsbergian, more let-it-all-hang-out than on this, his most controlled, plainspoken, deeply felt, and uninhibited album...he sounds glad to be alive, so that horror and pain become occasions for courage and eloquence as well as bitterness and sarcasm." Christgau also praised the musicianship, writing that "Reed's voice - precise, conversational, stirring whether offhand or inspirational - sings his love of language itself, with Fernando Saunders's bass articulating his tenderness and the guitars of Robert Quine and Reed himself fleshing out the terrible beauty he's borne."

In The Boston Phoenix, Ariel Swartley wrote that "What Reed has done (it sounds simple to lay things out this way, the album's anything but) is to expose rock ‘n’ roll’s intellectual affinities without spoiling its immediacy. He’s solved, or at least brought evidence to bear on, a variety of post-punk problems: how to say complicated things in inarticulate-sounding voices; how to achieve the sustained revelation of confessional writing while escaping the claustrophobic confines of personality; how to reconcile inspiration with craft. All this, too, in a lean, guitar-dominated song cycle that has the luminous intensity of a Hejira or an Astral Weeks.

Ira Robbins of Trouser Press praised the album as "a triumphant success" with "some of Reed's strongest writing in years. The portraits he paints are miserable characters living outside society; it's not clear whether or not they're fictional."

NME said, "What made The Blue Mask Lou Reed’s watershed album was his choice of musicians, a new wave super-set of them – Fernando Saunders on bass, Doane Perry on drums, and the legendary Robert Quine on guitar.

Alternately, Barney Hoskyns criticized the album for a "smarmy self-satisfaction that said: 'I may have been a bit of a jerk when I strutted around on stage with a needle in my arm, but I am now a bona fide Artist and you will treat me as such.'"

The Blue Mask would later place fifth in The Village Voice's annual Pazz & Jop critics poll.

In a retrospective appraisal, Jess Harvell of Pitchfork praised Quine's "virtuoso blend of post-Reed skronk and speed-folkie melodicism" and wrote that "The Blue Mask is still the one to slot alongside Transformer and Street Hassle. The album realigned Reed with the punk and new/no wave movements he helped sire, and it was helped into the canon by Reed's strongest (and most heart-wrenching) batch of songs in years."

== Track listing ==
All songs written by Lou Reed.

Side one

1. "My House" – 5:25
2. "Women" – 4:57
3. "Underneath the Bottle" – 2:33
4. "The Gun" – 3:41
5. "The Blue Mask" – 5:06

Side two

1. "Average Guy" – 3:12
2. "The Heroine" – 3:06
3. "Waves of Fear" – 4:11
4. "The Day John Kennedy Died" – 4:08
5. "Heavenly Arms" – 4:47

== Personnel ==
Musicians

- Lou Reed – guitar, vocals
- Robert Quine – guitar
- Fernando Saunders – bass guitar, backing vocals
- Doane Perry – drums

Technical

- Sean Fullan – recording engineer, co-producer

== Charts ==
Chart performance for The Blue Mask
Chart (1982)	Peak position
Dutch Albums (Album Top 100)	28
German Albums (Offizielle Top 100)	52
French Albums (SNEP)	15
Italian Albums (Musica e Dischi)	24
New Zealand Albums (RMNZ)	35
Swedish Albums (Sverigetopplistan)	17
US Billboard 200	169
