= Vicious (Lou Reed song) =

Single by Lou Reed

from the album Transformer
- B-side: "Goodnight Ladies" (US) "Satellite of Love" (Europe)
- Released: April 1973
- Recorded: August 1972
- Studio: Trident, London
- Genre: Glam rock; proto-punk
- Length: 2:56
- Label: RCA Victor
- Songwriter: Lou Reed
- Producers: David Bowie; Mick Ronson

"Vicious" is a song written by Lou Reed, released as a single in 1973 and originally featured on Transformer, Reed's second post-Velvet Underground solo album.

== Origins ==
Lou Reed told Rolling Stone that Andy Warhol inspired the song: "He said, 'Why don't you write a song called 'Vicious'? And I said, 'What kind of vicious?' 'Oh, you know, vicious like I hit you with a flower.' And I wrote it down literally."

== Reception ==
Cash Box said that "Reed's lyric has a somewhat sarcastic tone that makes the listener take note almost immediately. Here again, he shines with a driving rocker and a great story line that should make this effort a natural hit."

== In popular culture ==
"Vicious" was featured on season 4, episode 5 of the Showtime TV series Billions.
