= Set the Twilight Reeling =

Studio album by Lou Reed
- Released: February 20, 1996
- Recorded: 1995
- Venue: The Roof, New York City (track 6)
- Studio: Magic Shop, New York City
- Genre: Rock
- Length: 50:56
- Label: Warner Bros.
- Producer: Lou Reed

Lou Reed chronology
Between Thought and Expression: The Lou Reed Anthology (1992)	Set the Twilight Reeling (1996)	Different Times: Lou Reed in the '70s (1996)

Set the Twilight Reeling is the seventeenth studio album by American rock musician Lou Reed, released on February 20, 1996, by Warner Bros. Records.

== Packaging and lyrics ==
The cover artwork direction and packaging design was done by Stefan Sagmeister. The photograph is by Timothy Greenfield-Sanders. The CD case sold with the album was a dark purple/blue hue, making the cover look like a dark blue picture of Reed's face; the bright yellow aspect and the "rays" of the cover image were only made apparent when the liner notes were removed from its case.

Included in the liner notes of the CD booklet is the following: "Due to increased dynamic range, raise volume above average. PLAY IT LOUD."

As noted on the lyric sheet, "Finish Line" was Reed's tribute to the Velvet Underground's guitarist Sterling Morrison, who had died the previous year. The album is dedicated to Laurie Anderson, whom Reed would marry twelve years after its release. David Fricke of Rolling Stone wrote that Laurie Anderson was the love interest in the track "Hooky Wooky", in which Reed writes of his jealousy over his paramour's ex-lovers.

The album received the Parental Advisory sticker in the United Kingdom, due to "Sex with Your Parents (Motherfucker) Part II". He told Barney Hoskyns of Mojo in March 1996, "I still don't know why we have to have [the sticker]. I was only just told yesterday, and I'm really shocked." Reed also said the sticker appeared on European copies, telling Jim Sullivan in an interview:

"You know what's funny about that? They actually take 'motherfucker' off the back of the packaging, or we get a sticker. And if it's not gonna say 'motherfucker' on the back, we don't get a sticker. You know what's hilarious about that? It's 'motherfucker' they object to. They don't object to 'sex with your parents'."

== Critical reception ==
Professional ratings
Review scores
Source	Rating
AllMusic	3/5 stars
Alternative Press	5/5
Christgau's Consumer Guide	A−
Entertainment Weekly	B+
The Guardian	4/5 stars
Los Angeles Times	3.5/4 stars
NME	8/10
Q	4/5 stars
Rolling Stone	4/5 stars
Spin	6/10

Set the Twilight Reeling received generally positive reviews from critics.

== Track listing ==
All tracks written by Lou Reed.

1. "Egg Cream" – 5:18
2. "NYC Man" – 4:56
3. "Finish Line" – 3:24
4. "Trade In" – 4:59
5. "Hang On to Your Emotions" – 3:46
6. "Sex with Your Parents (Motherfucker) Part II" – 3:37
7. "HookyWooky" – 4:19
8. "The Proposition" – 3:27
9. "Adventurer" – 4:18
10. "Riptide" – 7:46
11. "Set the Twilight Reeling" – 5:04

Track 6 recorded live on July 4, 1995, at The Roof, New York City

== Personnel ==
Credits are adapted from the Set the Twilight Reeling liner notes.

- Lou Reed – vocals, guitar
- Fernando Saunders – bass guitar, acoustic guitar on "NYC Man", backing vocals
- Tony "Thunder" Smith – drums, backing vocals
- Oliver Lake, J. D. Parran, Russell Gunn – horns on "NYC Man"
- Roy Bittan – piano on "Finish Line"
- Mino Cinelu – percussion on "Finish Line"
- Laurie Anderson – backing vocals on "Hang On to Your Emotions"

Technical

- Struan Oglanby – programming, production co-ordination
- Bob Ludwig - mastering
