= Berlin (Lou Reed album) =

Studio album by Lou Reed
- Released: October 5, 1973
- Studios: Morgan (London); Record Plant (New York City)
- Genres: Art rock; rock opera; orchestral rock
- Length: 49:23
- Label: RCA Victor
- Producer: Bob Ezrin

Lou Reed chronology
Transformer (1972)	Berlin (1973)	Rock 'n' Roll Animal (1974)

Singles from Berlin
- 1. "How Do You Think It Feels" Released: October 1973 (US); 2. "Caroline Says I" Released: February 1974 (UK)

Berlin is the third solo studio album by American rock musician Lou Reed, released in October 1973 by RCA Records. A concept album, Berlin tells the story of a couple's struggle with abuse and drug addiction. Initially, critical reception was mixed but appraisals of the album have warmed over the years: in 1973 Rolling Stone declared the album "a disaster" but by 2012 the album was ranked No. 344 on its list of the 500 greatest albums of all time.

== Concept ==
The album is a tragic rock opera about a doomed couple, Jim and Caroline, and addresses themes of drug use, prostitution, depression, domestic violence and suicide.

The concept was created when producer Bob Ezrin mentioned to Reed that although the stories told by Reed's songs had great beginnings, they never really had an ending. Specifically, Ezrin wanted to know what happened to the couple from "Berlin" – a song from Reed's first solo album.

"The Kids" tells of Caroline having her children taken from her by the authorities and features the sounds of children crying for their mother.

== Live performance ==
Reed and producer Bob Ezrin planned a stage adaptation of the album upon its initial release but shelved the plans due to mixed reviews and poor sales. In 2007 Reed fulfilled his original hopes by touring the album with a 30-piece band, 12 choristers and Anohni. Director Julian Schnabel filmed the concert and released it in 2008 as Berlin: Live at St. Ann's Warehouse, which opened to strong reviews. The album was digitally re-mastered and re-released on compact disc to commemorate the event.

== Musical themes ==
Instrumentally, Reed plays acoustic guitar. As with Reed's previous two studio albums, Berlin re-drafts several songs that had been written and recorded previously. The title track first appeared on Reed's solo debut album, only here it is simplified, the key changed and re-arranged for solo piano. "Oh, Jim" makes use of the Velvet Underground outtake "Oh, Gin". "Caroline Says II" is a rewrite of "Stephanie Says" from VU (though the latter was not released until 1985). The Velvet Underground had also recorded an alternative demo of "Sad Song", which had much milder lyrics in its original form. "Men of Good Fortune" had also been played by the Velvet Underground as early as 1966; an archival live recording, which can be heard only at the Andy Warhol Museum in Pittsburgh, Pennsylvania, features the song.

== Packaging ==
The album cover was conceived by Pacific Eye & Ear, which also designed Alice Cooper's Muscle of Love the same year. The first lyrical lines of "Berlin" are shown beneath a collage of characters from the concept album.

== Musical style and critical reception ==
Professional ratings
Review scores
Source	Rating
AllMusic	3.5/5 stars
Chicago Tribune	4/4 stars
Creem	C
Encyclopedia of Popular Music	4/5 stars
Pitchfork	9.2/10
Q	5/5 stars
The Rolling Stone Album Guide	4/5 stars
Spin	4/5 stars
Spin Alternative Record Guide	8/10

The music on Berlin has been described as art rock, rock opera, and orchestral rock. Stephen Davis, in a December 1973 review for Rolling Stone, felt the album was a "disaster"; he disliked the world of "paranoia, schizophrenia, degradation, pill-induced violence and suicide" that the album introduced to the listener, as well as Reed's "spoken and shouted" performance. In a February 1974 review for Creem, Robert Christgau felt that the story about "two drug addicts who fall into sadie-mazie in thrillingly decadent Berlin" was "lousy" and the music was "only competent".

Berlin reached No. 7 on the UK album chart (Reed's best achievement there until 1992's Magic and Loss). The BPI awarded the record a silver certification. Poor sales in the U.S. (No. 98) and harsh criticism made Reed feel disillusioned about the album; however, he often featured Berlin material in his live shows, and concert renditions of most of the album's songs including "Berlin", "Lady Day", "Caroline Says I", "How Do You Think It Feels", "Oh, Jim", "The Kids", "The Bed" and "Sad Song" can be found on various live albums preceding his 2006 staging of the entire album in concert.

Cash Box said of "How Do You Think it Feels" that it is "that kind of infectious track that folks will not forget," although it is "lyrically heavy." Record World said of it that this "heavy metal item from his Berlin lp should blitz the charts."

=== Legacy ===
In 2003 Rolling Stone ranked Berlin at number 344 on its list of the 500 greatest albums of all time, with the album maintaining this position in a 2012 update of the list. In 2008 a filmed live performance of the album was well received. When asked if he felt vindicated, Reed said, "For what? I always liked Berlin." The album was also included in the book 1001 Albums You Must Hear Before You Die.

The Scottish folk rock band the Waterboys takes its name from a line in the song "The Kids". The Mexican and Spanish singer Alaska's name was inspired by the song "Caroline Says II".

=== Covers ===
"Caroline Says II" has been covered by several artists, including the Soft Boys, Human Drama, Mercury Rev and Marc and the Mambas. Siouxsie Sioux did a cover version of the song with the musicians of Suede in 1993. In 2008 Rick de Leeuw recorded a Dutch translation of the song, with the approval of Lou Reed himself.

== Track listing ==
All tracks are written by Lou Reed.

Side one

1. "Berlin" – 3:23
2. "Lady Day" – 3:40
3. "Men of Good Fortune" – 4:37
4. "Caroline Says I" – 3:57
5. "How Do You Think It Feels" – 3:42
6. "Oh, Jim" – 5:13

Side two

1. "Caroline Says II" – 4:10
2. "The Kids" – 7:55
3. "The Bed" – 5:51
4. "Sad Song" – 6:55

=== Lost track ===
The album was recorded as a 64 minute double LP, but the tracks were edited into shorter versions after RCA got cold feet about an expensive double package with no obvious hits. None of the original long versions have been subsequently released, with one exception. The initial 8-track tape and cassette tape release of Berlin included an untitled one-minute instrumental piano solo performed by Allan Macmillan, placed between the songs "Berlin" and "Lady Day". It has otherwise never been featured on any vinyl or CD editions, or any subsequent reissue. There has never been any official explanation for this, although it may have been placed there in order to fill time and allow for uninterrupted song sequencing between the four programs on the 8-track version. In 2006, when Reed performed the entire album at St. Ann's Warehouse in New York, this solo was reinstated, performed before "Caroline Says II", arguably suggesting this is where the piece may have been originally intended to appear in the track sequence.

== Personnel ==
Credits are adapted from the Berlin liner notes.

Musicians

- Lou Reed – vocals, acoustic guitar
- Bob Ezrin – piano, Mellotron, arrangement
- Steve Winwood – organ, harmonium
- Steve Hunter – electric guitar
- Dick Wagner – electric guitar, backing vocals
- Jack Bruce – bass guitar except "Lady Day" & "The Kids"
- Aynsley Dunbar – drums except "Lady Day" & "The Kids"
- Michael Brecker – tenor saxophone
- Randy Brecker – trumpet

Other Musicians

- Tony Levin – bass guitar on "The Kids"
- B. J. Wilson – drums on "Lady Day" & "The Kids"
- Allan Macmillan – piano on "Berlin"
- Gene Martynec – acoustic guitar, synthesizer and vocal arrangement on "The Bed", bass guitar on "Lady Day"
- Jon Pierson – bass trombone
- Blue Weaver – piano on "Men of Good Fortune"
- Steve Hyden, Elizabeth March, Dick Wagner, Lou Reed – choir
- The London Philharmonic Orchestra

Production

- Bob Ezrin – producer
- Jim Reeves – engineer
- Allan Macmillan – arrangement

== Charts ==
=== Weekly charts ===
Chart	Peak Position
Australia (Kent Music Report)	59
Dutch Album Chart	16
UK Album Chart	7

== Certifications ==
- UK: Silver
