= Transformer (Lou Reed album) =

Studio album by Lou Reed
- Released: November 8, 1972
- Recorded: August 1972
- Studio: Trident (London)
- Genre: Glam rock
- Length: 36:40
- Label: RCA Victor
- Producers: David Bowie; Mick Ronson

Lou Reed chronology
Lou Reed (1972)	Transformer (1972)	Berlin (1973)

Singles from Transformer
- 1. "Walk on the Wild Side" / "Perfect Day" Released: November 1972; 2. "Satellite of Love" Released: February 1973; 3. "Vicious" Released: April 1973

Transformer is the second solo studio album by American musician Lou Reed. Produced by David Bowie and Mick Ronson, the album was released on November 8, 1972 by RCA Records. It is considered an influential landmark of the glam rock genre, anchored by Reed's most successful single, "Walk on the Wild Side", which touched on controversial topics of sexual orientation, gender identity, prostitution, and drug use. Although Reed's self-titled debut solo album had been unsuccessful, Bowie had been an early fan of Reed's former band the Velvet Underground and used his fame to promote Reed, who had not yet achieved mainstream success.

== Background ==
As with its predecessor Lou Reed, Transformer contains songs Reed wrote while in the Velvet Underground (here, four out of eleven). "Andy's Chest" was first recorded by the band in 1969 and "Satellite of Love" demoed in 1970; these versions were released on VU and Peel Slowly and See, respectively. For Transformer, the original up-tempo pace of these songs was slowed down.

"New York Telephone Conversation" and "Goodnight Ladies" were played live during the band's summer 1970 residency at Max's Kansas City; the latter takes its title refrain from the last line of the second section ("A Game of Chess") of T. S. Eliot's modernist poem, The Waste Land: "Good night, ladies, good night, sweet ladies, good night, good night", which is itself a quote from Ophelia in Hamlet.

As in Reed's Velvet Underground days, the connection to artist Andy Warhol remained strong. According to Reed, Warhol told him he should write a song about someone vicious. When Reed asked what he meant by vicious, Warhol replied, "Oh, you know, like I hit you with a flower", resulting in the song "Vicious". Reed wrote in his book, Between Thought and Expression, about his single "Walk on the Wild Side": "They were going to make a musical out of Nelson Algren's book A Walk on the Wild Side. When they dropped the project I took my song and changed the book's characters into people I knew from Warhol's factory. I don’t like to waste things."

== Production ==
Transformer was produced by David Bowie and Mick Ronson, both of whom had been strongly influenced by Reed's work with the Velvet Underground. Bowie had obliquely referenced the Velvet Underground in the cover notes for his album Hunky Dory and regularly performed both "White Light/White Heat" and "I'm Waiting for the Man" in concerts and on the BBC during 1971–1973. He even began recording "White Light/White Heat" for inclusion on Pin Ups, but it was never completed; Ronson ended up using the backing track for his solo album Play Don't Worry in 1974.

Mick Ronson (who was at the time the lead guitarist with Bowie's band, the Spiders from Mars) played a major role in the recording of the album at Trident Studios, London, serving as the co-producer and primary session musician (contributing guitar, piano, recorder and backing vocals), as well as arranger, contributing the string arrangement for "Perfect Day". Reed lauded Ronson's contribution in the Transformer episode of the documentary series Classic Albums, praising the beauty of his work and keeping down the vocal to highlight the strings. The songs on the album are now among Reed's best-known works, including "Walk on the Wild Side", "Perfect Day" and "Satellite of Love", and the album's commercial success elevated him from cult status to become an international star.

== Artwork ==
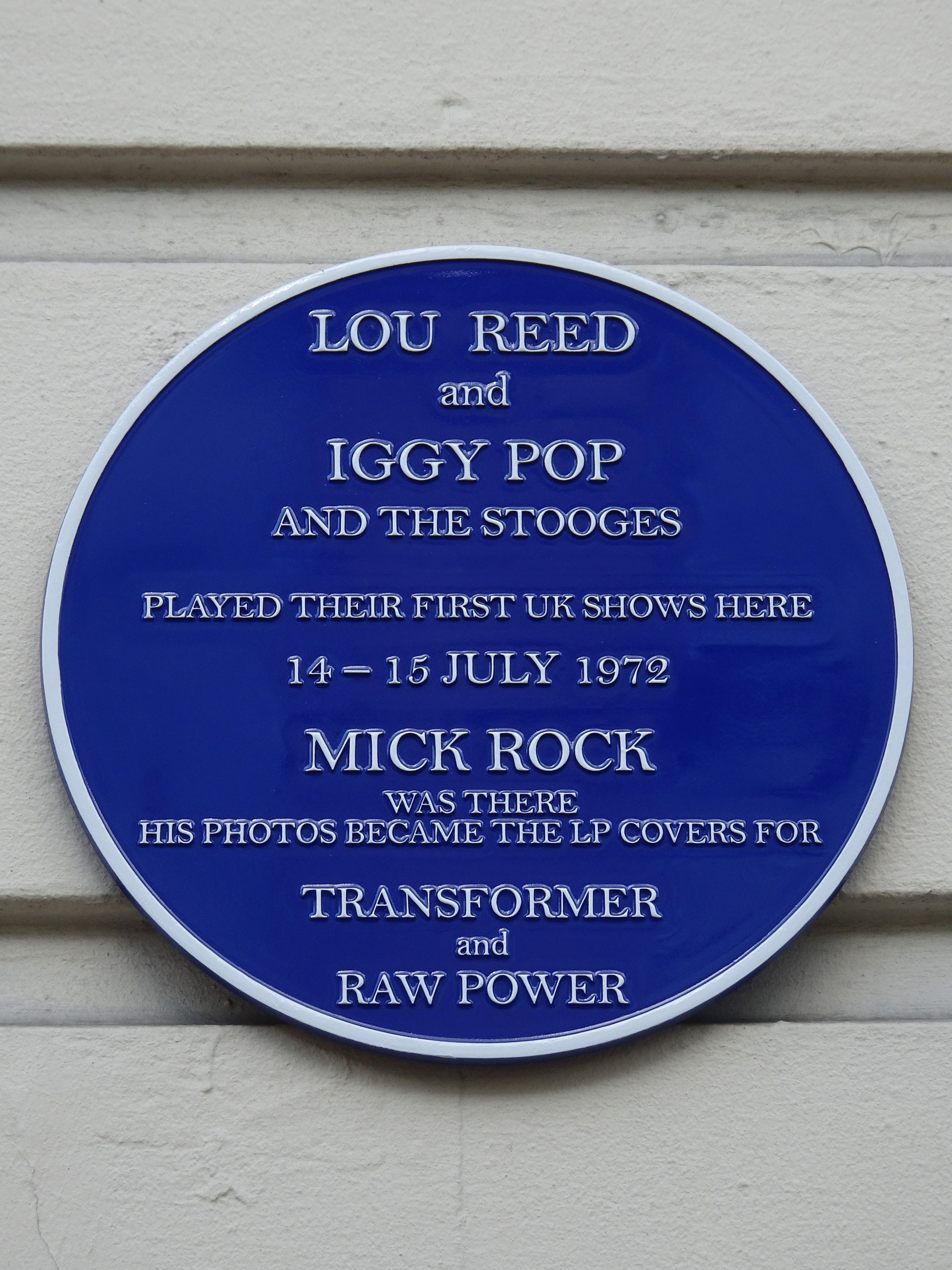
Blue plaque at Scala, 275 Pentonville Road, Kings Cross, London, marking the gigs of 14 and 15 July 1972 at which the Stooges and Reed played; a photograph by Mick Rock from one of these shows appears on the cover of Transformer.

The cover art was from a Mick Rock photograph that inadvertently became over-exposed as he was printing it in the darkroom. Rock noticed the flaw but decided he liked the serendipitous effect enough to submit the image for the album cover.

According to Rock, "When I showed Lou the contact sheets, he zeroed in on the transformer shot. I made the print myself – as I usually did in those days. The first test I made fell out of focus in the exposure. Lou loved the result. It took me twelve attempts to reproduce this accident for the final larger print for the album cover".

Karl Stoecker (who also shot the first three Roxy Music album covers) took the back cover photo of a woman and a man. The woman is 1960s London supermodel Gala Mitchell. The man is portrayed by Ernie Thormahlen (a friend of Reed). The man appears to have a noticeable erection, although Reed has said this was actually a banana which Thormahlen had stuffed down his jeans before the photo shoot.

== Release ==
The first single from the album, "Walk on the Wild Side", became an international success, despite its controversial subject matter. The song's lyrics mention transgender issues, sex acts, and drugs, leading it to be edited in some countries and banned in others. It is now generally regarded by fans and critics as Reed's signature tune. "Satellite of Love" was issued as the second single in February 1973. In 2002, a 30th anniversary edition of the album was released; in addition to demos of "Hangin' Round" and "Perfect Day", it includes a hidden track featuring an advert for the album. Following Reed's death in October 2013, digital sales of Transformer, "Walk on the Wild Side", and "Perfect Day" all rose more than 300%, and "Walk on the Wild Side" cracked the new Billboard Rock Digital Songs chart at No. 38.

== Critical reception ==
Retrospective professional ratings
Review scores
Source	Rating
AllMusic	4.5/5 stars
Blender	4/5 stars
Chicago Tribune	2/4 stars
Christgau's Record Guide	B−
Encyclopedia of Popular Music	4/5 stars
Pitchfork	8.4/10
Rolling Stone	4.5/5 stars
The Rolling Stone Album Guide	4/5 stars
Spin	4.5/5 stars
Spin Alternative Record Guide	8/10

In a mixed review for Rolling Stone, Nick Tosches noted the songs "Satellite of Love", "Vicious", "Walk on the Wild Side" and "Hangin' 'Round" which he felt expressed a stimulating sexuality saying "Reed himself says he thinks the album's great. I don't think it's nearly as good as he's capable of doing. He seems to have the abilities to come up with some really dangerous, powerful music, stuff that people like Jagger and Bowie have only rubbed knees with." In a retrospective review for The New Rolling Stone Album Guide (2004), Tom Hull remarked that Reed "wrote a bunch of clever new songs and tried to cash in on producer David Bowie's trendily androgynous glam rock, which worked well enough to break 'Walk on the Wild Side.'"

In 1997, Transformer was named the 44th greatest album of all time in a "Music of the Millennium" poll conducted in the United Kingdom by HMV, Channel 4, The Guardian and Classic FM. In 2000, it was voted number 58 in Colin Larkin's All Time Top 1000 Albums. Transformer is also ranked at number 55 on NME's list of "Greatest Albums of All Time". In 2003, the album was ranked at number 194 on Rolling Stone's list of the 500 greatest albums of all time, maintaining the rating in a 2012 revised list, and is ranked 109 on the 2020 list. It is also on Q magazine's list of the "100 Greatest Albums Ever".

In 2018, 33⅓ published a book by musician Ezra Furman about Transformer.

== Track listing ==
All tracks are written by Lou Reed.

Side one
No.	Title	Length
1.	"Vicious"	2:55
2.	"Andy's Chest"	3:17
3.	"Perfect Day"	3:43
4.	"Hangin' 'Round"	3:39
5.	"Walk on the Wild Side"	4:12

Side two
No.	Title	Length
1.	"Make Up"	2:58
2.	"Satellite of Love"	3:40
3.	"Wagon Wheel"	3:19
4.	"New York Telephone Conversation"	1:31
5.	"I'm So Free"	3:07
6.	"Goodnight Ladies"	4:19
Total length:		36:40

30th Anniversary Edition Bonus Tracks
No.	Title	Length
1.	"Hangin' 'Round" (acoustic demo)	3:58
2.	"Perfect Day" (acoustic demo; includes a hidden track featuring an advert for the album)	4:50

== Personnel ==
Taken from the Transformer liner notes.

Musicians

- Lou Reed – lead vocals, guitar
- Mick Ronson – guitar, backing vocals, piano, recorder, string and brass arrangements
- David Bowie – backing vocals
- Thunderthighs – backing vocals
- Herbie Flowers – bass guitar, double bass, tuba
- Klaus Voormann – bass guitar
- John Halsey – drums
- Barry DeSouza – drums
- Ritchie Dharma – drums
- Ronnie Ross – baritone saxophone
- Trevor Bolder – trumpet

Production

- David Bowie – producer, mixing
- Mick Ronson – producer, mixing
- Ken Scott – engineer, mixing
- Lou Reed – mixing
- Mike Stone – mixing
- Arun Chakraverty – mastering
- Karl Stoeker – color photographs
- Mick White – black and white photographs

== Charts ==
Chart (1972)	Peak position
Australian Albums (Kent Music Report)	12
Dutch Albums Chart	11
UK Albums Chart	13
US Billboard Top LPs & Tape	29

Chart (2026)	Peak position
Belgian Albums (Ultratop Flanders)	166

== Sales and certifications ==
Region	Certification	Certified units/sales
Australia (ARIA)	Gold	20,000^{^}
Denmark (IFPI Danmark)	Gold	10,000^{‡}
France (SNEP)	Gold	100,000^{*}
Italy (FIMI)	Platinum	50,000^{‡}
United Kingdom (BPI)	Platinum	424,666
^{*} Sales figures based on certification alone.^{^} Shipments figures based on certification alone.^{‡} Sales+streaming figures based on certification alone.
