= Walk on the Wild Side (Lou Reed song) =

1972 single by Lou Reed

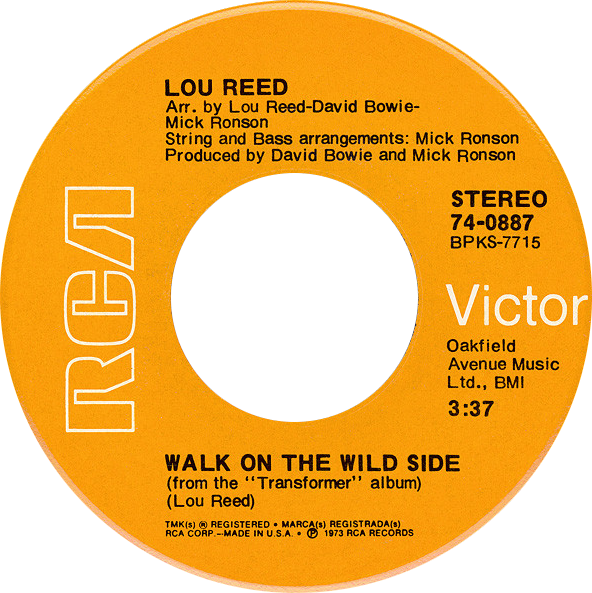
- One of label variants of the US single

Single by Lou Reed

from the album Transformer
- A-side: "Perfect Day"
- Released: November 1972
- Recorded: August 1972
- Studio: Trident (London, England)
- Genre: Glam rock
- Length: 4:12
- Label: RCA Victor
- Songwriter: Lou Reed
- Producers: David Bowie; Mick Ronson

Lou Reed singles chronology
"Walk and Talk It" (1972)	"Walk on the Wild Side" (1972)	"Satellite of Love" (1973)

Audio
- "Lou Reed - Walk on the Wild Side (Official Audio)" on YouTube

"Walk on the Wild Side" is a song by American rock musician Lou Reed from his second solo album, Transformer (1972). It was produced by David Bowie and Mick Ronson and released as a double A-side single with "Perfect Day". Known as a counterculture anthem, the song received heavy radio play and became Reed's biggest hit and signature song. The single peaked at No. 16 on the Billboard Hot 100 singles chart in early 1973.

The song's lyrics describe various individuals and their journeys to New York City. Specifically, the song refers to several of the "superstars" at Andy Warhol's New York studio, the Factory: Holly Woodlawn, Candy Darling, Joe Dallesandro, Jackie Curtis, and Joe Campbell (referred to in the song by the nickname "Sugar Plum Fairy"). "Walk on the Wild Side" touched on topics considered taboo at the time it was released, including transgender people, drugs, male prostitution, and oral sex.

== Inspiration and lyrics ==
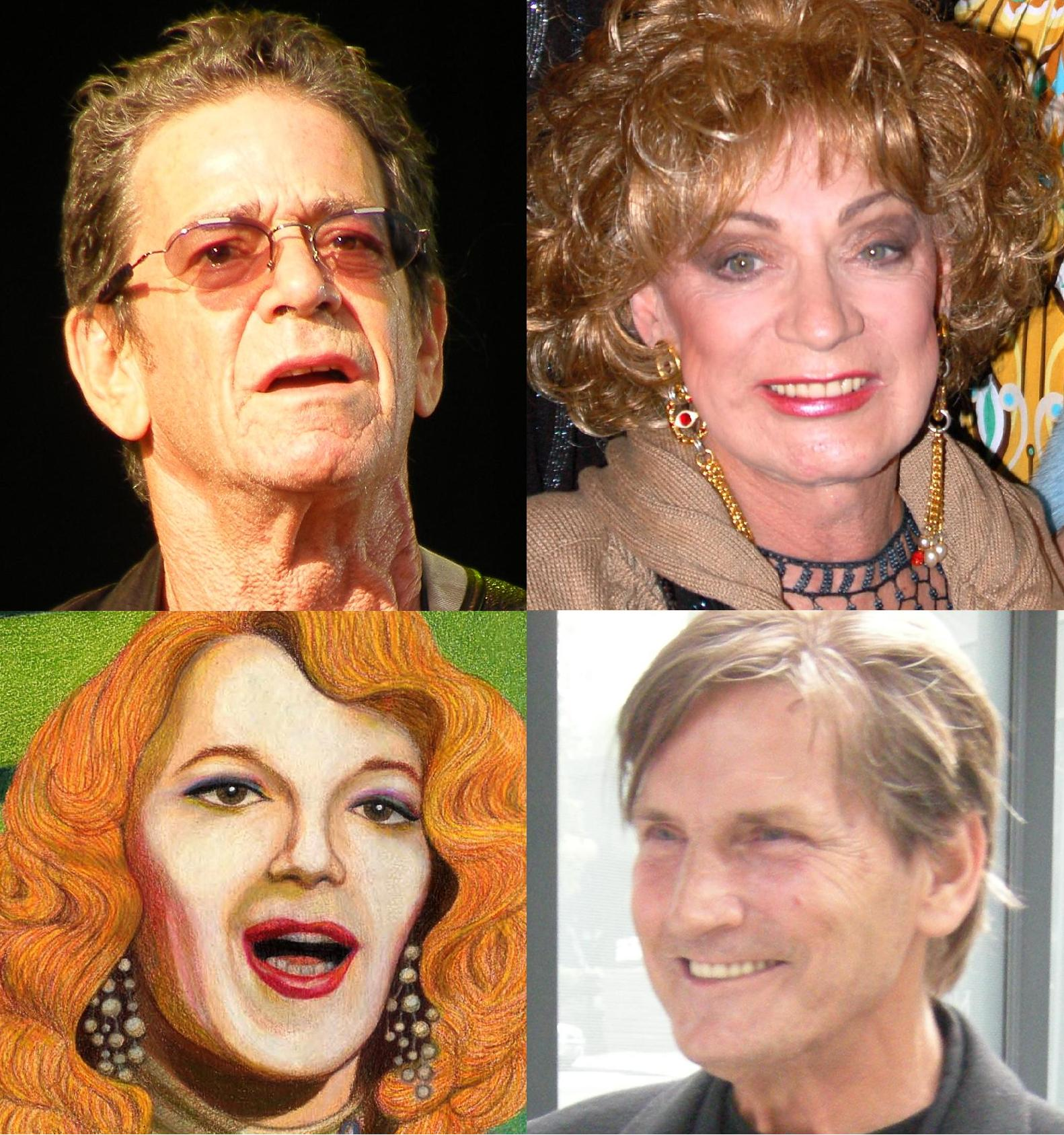
Reed and three of the people described in the lyrics of "Walk on the Wild Side: Holly Woodlawn, Jackie Curtis and Joe Dallesandro.

Reed has said that the song was inspired by Nelson Algren's 1956 novel A Walk on the Wild Side (which was itself named after the 1952 song "The Wild Side of Life").

Each verse of "Walk on the Wild Side" refers to one of the Warhol superstars:

- "Holly" is Holly Woodlawn, a transgender actress who lived in Miami Beach, Florida, as a child. In 1962, after being bullied by homophobes, the fifteen-year-old ran away from home; as the lyrics state, Holly learned how to pluck her eyebrows while hitchhiking to New York.
- "Candy" is Candy Darling, a transgender actress, who had previously been the subject of "Candy Says" by Reed's former band the Velvet Underground. She grew up on Long Island ("the island") and was a regular at "the back room" of Max's Kansas City.
- "Little Joe" was the nickname of Joe Dallesandro, an actor who starred in Flesh, a 1968 film about a teenage hustler. The lyrics are based on Dallesandro's character in the film, not on Dallesandro personally.
- "Sugar Plum Fairy" is Joe Campbell, who played a character by that name in Warhol's 1965 film My Hustler. The term was a euphemism for "drug dealer". Prior to joining the Warhol entourage, Campbell was Harvey Milk's partner for several years.
- "Jackie" is Jackie Curtis, another Warhol actress.

The lyrics of "Walk on the Wild Side" were groundbreaking and risqué for their time, telling stories not usually told in rock songs up to then and containing references to prostitution, transgender people, and oral sex. "I always thought it would be kinda fun to introduce people to characters they maybe hadn't met before, or hadn't wanted to meet", Reed said.

== Production, musicians, and musical elements ==
"Walk on the Wild Side" was produced by David Bowie and Mick Ronson.

"Walk on the Wild Side" is based on a simple plagal progression alternating between C major and F major, or I and IV in the key of C major. The pre-chorus introduces the ii chord (D minor).

The song is noted for its twinned ascending and descending portamento basslines played by Herbie Flowers. For performing on both double bass and bass guitar, Flowers was paid two session fees of £17 (equivalent to £201 in 2025), one for each part.

The baritone saxophone solo played over the fadeout of the song is performed by Ronnie Ross, who had taught David Bowie to play the saxophone during Bowie's childhood. The acoustic guitar was performed by co-producer Mick Ronson, then Bowie's guitarist. The backing vocals are sung by Thunderthighs, a vocal group that included Dari Lalou, Karen Friedman, and Casey Synge. Drums were played by Ritchie Dharma using brushes rather than drumsticks.

== Release and reception ==
"Walk on the Wild Side" was included on Reed's second solo album, Transformer (1972). It was released as a double A-side single with "Perfect Day". The song received heavy radio play and became Reed's biggest hit and signature song. "Walk on the Wild Side" was a worldwide hit. The single peaked at No. 16 on the Billboard Hot 100 singles chart in early 1973.

In 1972, RCA provided radio stations with a version of the song in which the reference to oral sex was omitted and the line "colored girls" was changed to "and the girls". However, most radio stations continued to play the original, uncensored version. In 1973, Record World called "Walk on the Wild Side" a "real leftfielder from the former Velvet Undergrounder" and said that "programmers will be cautious at first but then will have to go with it". In the UK, the oral sex reference slipped past the censors.

After the announcement of Reed's death in October 2013, both the song and the Transformer album re-charted via iTunes.

== Legacy ==
"Walk on the Wild Side" became known as a counterculture anthem. In 2013, The New York Times described the song as a "ballad of misfits and oddballs" and "a siren song luring generations of people ... to a New York so long forgotten as to seem imaginary".

In 2010, Rolling Stone magazine ranked "Walk on the Wild Side" as the 223rd greatest song of all time.

In 2015, the song was inducted into the Grammy Hall of Fame.

== Charts ==
=== Weekly charts ===
Chart (1972–1973)	Peak position
Australia (Kent Music Report)	100
Canada (RPM)	18
Ireland (IRMA)	13
Netherlands (Dutch Top 40)	21
Netherlands (Single Top 100)	15
Spain (AFE)	11
UK Singles (Official Charts)	10
US Billboard Hot 100	16
US Cash Box Top 100	17

Chart (2013)	Peak position
Australia (ARIA)	95
Austria (Ö3 Austria Top 40)	57
France (SNEP)	13
Germany (GfK)	67
Italy (FIMI)	17
Japan Hot 100 (Billboard)	29
Spain (Promusicae)	21
Switzerland (Schweizer Hitparade)	39
UK Singles (OCC)	53
US Hot Rock & Alternative Songs (Billboard)	14

=== Year-end charts ===
Chart (1973)	Rank
Canada Top Singles (RPM)	95

== Certifications ==
Region	Certification	Certified units/sales
Italy (FIMI)	Platinum	50,000^{‡}
Spain (Promusicae)	Platinum	60,000^{‡}
United Kingdom (BPI)	Platinum	600,000^{‡}
^{‡} Sales+streaming figures based on certification alone.

== Cover versions ==
- In 1973, Italian singer Patty Pravo covered the song in Italian for her album Pazza idea, under the title "I giardini di Kensington"; the lyrics for the cover were inspired by the 1906 novel Peter Pan in Kensington Gardens.
- In 1990, English musician Jamie J. Morgan released his version of "Walk on the Wild Side". It peaked at number 27 on the UK Singles Chart, at number 25 in Australia, and at number one in New Zealand.
- Also in 1990, British dance act Beat System's cover of the song reached number 63 on the UK Singles Chart and number 96 on the UK Club Chart.
- In 1991, American hip-hop group Marky Mark and the Funky Bunch, fronted by actor and musician Mark Wahlberg, released the single "Wildside". "Wildside" heavily sampled "Walk on the Wild Side" and is stylistically similar to it. The song reached No. 10 on the Billboard Hot 100, and No. 8 on the Billboard Hot Rap Singles chart.

== See also ==
- "Can I Kick It?", a 1990 single by A Tribe Called Quest that features a prominent sample of the song.
