= Street Hassle =

Studio album by Lou Reed
- Released: February 1978
- Recorded: March – October, 1977
- Venue: live in Munich, Wiesbaden, Ludwigshafen, Germany
- Studio: Record Plant studios, New York City
- Genre: Rock; punk rock
- Length: 36:15
- Label: Arista
- Producer: Lou Reed; Richard Robinson

Lou Reed chronology
Walk on the Wild Side: The Best of Lou Reed (1977)	Street Hassle (1978)	Live: Take No Prisoners (1978)

Lou Reed studio album chronology
Rock and Roll Heart (1976)	Street Hassle (1978)	The Bells (1979)

Street Hassle is the eighth solo studio album by American rock musician Lou Reed, released in February 1978 by Arista Records. Richard Robinson and Reed produced the album. It is the first commercially released pop album to employ binaural recording technology. Street Hassle combines live concert tapes (with overdubs) and studio recordings.

== Production ==
All of the songs on Street Hassle were written by Reed, including "Real Good Time Together", a track that dates back to his days as a member of the Velvet Underground. Recording of a live album began in Munich and Ludwigshafen, West Germany. Unlike most live albums, the audience is completely muted from the mix during the concert recordings. Upon returning to the United States in August 1977, Arista Records told Reed releasing a live album was not an option, which began the NYC studio phase of the album. Then, producer Richard Robinson left the project after a fight in the studio. Determined to carry on, Reed moved the proceedings to Record Plant studios, accompanied by his recording engineer, Rod O’Brien.

Encouragement to focus and expand on the title song, "Street Hassle", came from Arista President Clive Davis, resulting in a three-part suite 11 minutes in length. The only song to be wholly written and recorded in the studio, culminating in a lyric by Reed, "Tramps like us, we were born to pay". After his engineer advised him that line belonged to somebody else, they both went downstairs, where Bruce Springsteen was working on his fourth studio album, which would be titled Darkness on the Edge of Town. Not only did Springsteen allow his "Born to Run" phrase to be used, he personally sang the line at Reed's request. By all accounts, the part was completed in one or two takes, to the mutual satisfaction of both. Springsteen was not credited for his performance in the liner notes of Street Hassle due to a policy set by his record label, Columbia Records.

=== Binaural recording ===
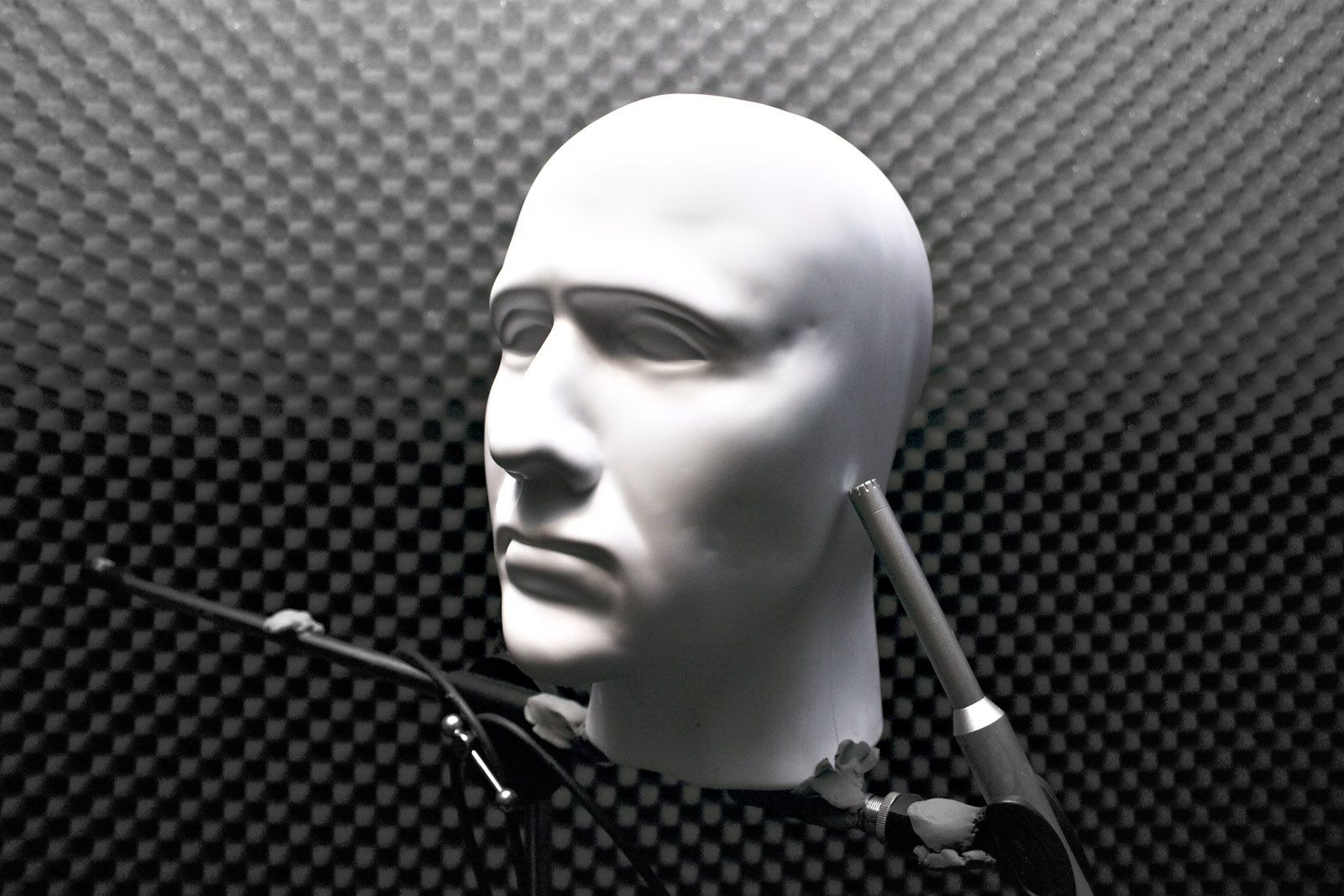
Dummy head being used for binaural recording, similar to the setup used for Street Hassle

The recording of Street Hassle was notable in that Reed and his co-producer chose to employ an experimental microphone placement technique called binaural recording. In binaural recording, two microphones are placed in the studio in an attempt to mimic the stereo sound of actually being in the room with the performers and instruments. In the case of the recording sessions and concerts that composed Street Hassle, engineers used a mannequin head with a microphone implanted in each ear. Binaural recordings are generally only effective when the user listens to the album through headphones, and do not generally translate correctly through stereo speakers.

Reed's particular binaural recording system was developed by Manfred Schunke of the German company Delta Acoustics; Schunke is credited as an engineer on Street Hassle. Reed would continue to use the binaural recording style on two more releases: the 1978 live album Live: Take No Prisoners and the 1979 studio album The Bells.

== Songs and composition ==
As was common on early Reed solo studio albums, Street Hassle contained a song originally written during Reed's days in the Velvet Underground—in this case, "Real Good Time Together," which had been previously released in 1974 on 1969: The Velvet Underground Live. "Dirt" is allegedly about his ex-manager, Dennis Katz.

AllMusic editor Mark Deming has written that "the title cut, a three-movement poetic tone poem about life on the New York streets, is one of the most audacious and deeply moving moments of Reed's solo career." Biographer Anthony DeCurtis describes the album as being largely motivated by and representative of the end of Reed's three-year relationship with Rachel Humphreys, a trans woman who is believed to have died of AIDS in 1990 and been buried in a Potter's Field on Hart Island in the Bronx. DeCurtis summarizes the title track as "something of a requiem for Reed and Rachel's relationship." In a 1979 article for Rolling Stone, Mikal Gilmore refers to Humphreys as the "raison d'être" for the album as a whole.

== Critical reception ==
Professional ratings
Review scores
Source	Rating
AllMusic	4/5 stars
Chicago Tribune	4/4 stars
Christgau's Record Guide	B+
Encyclopedia of Popular Music	4/5 stars
The Rolling Stone Album Guide	3/5 stars
Spin	3.5/5 stars
Spin Alternative Record Guide	7/10
The Village Voice	B

Street Hassle was met with mostly positive reviews, such as from Rolling Stone's Tom Carson, who called the album "brilliant" and "a confession of failure that becomes a stunning, incandescent triumph—the best solo album Lou Reed has ever done." Robert Christgau of The Village Voice, however, gave the album a lukewarm reception, observing that "despite the strength of much of the material," he found the album's "production muddled, its cynicism uninteresting, [and] its self-reference self-serving." Tim Lott of the Record Mirror said, "Lou Reed has been a musical corpse for years now. Street Hassle is a creative nadir."

In a retrospective review for AllMusic, Mark Deming noted that while "time has magnified its flaws," Street Hassle was "still among the most powerful and compelling albums [Reed] released during the 1970s, and too personal and affecting to ignore."

== Track listing ==
All tracks written by Lou Reed.

Side one

1. "Gimmie Some Good Times" – 3:15
2. "Dirt" – 4:43
3. "Street Hassle" – 10:53

A. "Waltzing Matilda" – 3:20
B. "Street Hassle" – 3:31
C. "Slipaway" – 4:02

Side two

4. "I Wanna Be Black" – 2:55
5. "Real Good Time Together" – 3:21
6. "Shooting Star" – 3:11
7. "Leave Me Alone" – 4:44
8. "Wait" – 3:13

== Personnel ==
Adapted from the Street Hassle liner notes.

Musicians

- Lou Reed – guitar, bass, piano, vocals
- Stuart Heinrich – guitar on "Street Hassle", backing vocals on "Leave Me Alone"
- Michael Fonfara – piano on "I Wanna Be Black" and "Shooting Star"
- Marty Fogel – saxophone
- Steve Friedman – bass on "Leave Me Alone"
- Jeffrey Ross – lead guitar, backing vocals on live recorded tracks (uncredited in liner notes)
- Michael Suchorsky – drums
- Aram Schefrin – string arrangement
- Genya Ravan – backing vocals
- Jo'Anna Kameron – backing vocals
- Angela Howard – backing vocals
- Christine Wiltshire – backing vocals
- Bruce Springsteen – spoken word on "Street Hassle: Slipaway" (uncredited in liner notes)

Production

- Lou Reed – producer; mixing
- Richard Robinson – producer
- Rod O'Brien – engineer; mixing
- Manfred Schunke – engineer of live recordings
- Heiner Friesz – engineer of live recordings
- Gray Russell – assistant engineer
- Gregg Caruso – assistant engineer
- Ted Jensen – mastering at Sterling Sound

== Charts ==
=== Weekly charts ===
Chart (1978)	Peak position
Australian Albums (Kent Music Report)	24
New Zealand Albums (RMNZ)	9
US Billboard 200	89

== See also ==
- List of albums released in 1978
- Lou Reed's discography
- Binaural recording
