= Berlin: Live at St. Ann's Warehouse =

Berlin
- Original film poster
- Directed by: Julian Schnabel
- Produced by: Jon Kilik; Tom Sarig
- Starring: Lou Reed; Emmanuelle Seigner
- Cinematography: Ellen Kuras
- Edited by: Benjamin Flaherty
- Music by: Lou Reed
- Distributed by: Third Rail Releasing
- Release dates: September 4, 2007 (Venice Film Festival); October 7, 2008 (United States)
- Running time: 81 minutes
- Countries: United Kingdom; United States
- Language: English
- Box office: $114,860

Berlin: Live at St. Ann's Warehouse

Live album by Lou Reed
- Released: November 4, 2008
- Recorded: December 15–16, 2006
- Genre: Rock
- Length: 79:30
- Label: Matador Records
- Producers: Bob Ezrin, Hal Willner

Lou Reed chronology
| Hudson River Wind Meditations (2007) | Berlin: Live at St. Ann's Warehouse (2008) | The Creation of the Universe (2008) |

Professional ratings
Aggregate scores
| Source | Rating |
|---|---|
| Metacritic | 70/100 |
Review scores
| Source | Rating |
| Allmusic | 3.5/5 stars |
| Rolling Stone | 4/5 stars |
| Spectrum Culture | (3.5/5.0) |
| Pitchfork Media | (7.2/10) |

Berlin: Live at St. Ann's Warehouse is a concert film and live album by American musician Lou Reed released in 2008. The concert film was directed by Julian Schnabel, live at St. Ann's Warehouse in Brooklyn during five nights in December 2006. Background shots of the characters Jim and Caroline were done by Lola Schnabel.

The Berlin tour was the first time Lou Reed had played the full album live in over 30 years, after the original album had been a critical and commercial disappointment (in spite of it being a top 10 album hitting #7 in the UK and going Silver). Individual songs had been played, but not the entire album.

The concert film and album both feature three non-Berlin songs as an encore, "Candy Says", "Rock Minuet" and "Sweet Jane".

== Track listing ==
All tracks composed by Lou Reed

1. "Intro" – 1:51
2. "Berlin" – 2:34
3. "Lady Day" – 4:12
4. "Men of Good Fortune" – 6:35
5. "Caroline Says (I)" – 4:31
6. "How Do You Think It Feels?" – 5:37
7. "Oh, Jim" – 8:16
8. "Caroline Says (II)" – 4:33
9. "The Kids" – 8:08
10. "The Bed" – 5:59
11. "Sad Song" – 8:21
12. "Candy Says" – 6:04
13. "Rock Minuet" – 7:18
14. "Sweet Jane" – 5:31

== Personnel ==
- Lou Reed – lead vocals, guitar
- Steve Hunter – guitars, bandleader
- Fernando Saunders – bass guitar, synthesizer, guitar, backing vocals
- Tony "Thunder" Smith – drums, backing vocals
- Rupert Christie – keyboards, backing vocals
- Rob Wasserman – double bass
- Sharon Jones – vocals
- Anohni Hegarty – vocals
- Steven Bernstein – flugelhorn, trumpet
- Curtis Fowlkes – trombone
- Paul Shapiro – saxophone, flute
- Doug Wieselman – bass clarinet, clarinet
- David Gold – viola
- Eyvind Kang – viola
- Jane Scarpantoni – cello
- Brooklyn Youth Chorus – choir
- Bob Ezrin - conductor

== Reception ==
On review aggregator website Rotten Tomatoes, the film holds an approval rating of 78% based on 32 reviews, with an average rating of 6.8/10.
