= Le Bataclan '72 =

Live album by Lou Reed, John Cale and Nico
- Released: October 19, 2004
- Recorded: January 29, 1972
- Venue: Le Bataclan, 50 Boulevard Voltaire, 75011 Paris
- Genre: Avant-garde; rock and roll
- Length: 71:14

Lou Reed chronology
Animal Serenade (2004)	Le Bataclan '72 (2004)	Hudson River Wind Meditations (2007)

John Cale chronology
HoboSapiens (2003)	Le Bataclan '72 (2004)	Process (2005)

Nico chronology
Reich der Träume (2002)	Le Bataclan '72 (2004)	The Frozen Borderline – 1968–1970 (2007)

Professional ratings
Review scores
Source	Rating
AllMusic	4.5/5 stars
Pitchfork	7.6/10

Le Bataclan '72 is a live album by Lou Reed, John Cale and Nico, released on October 19, 2004. The album was recorded from the soundboard during the 1972 concert and heavily bootlegged over the years, before it gained an official release in 2004.

== Background and production ==
The album was recorded during a live show at the Bataclan club in Paris, on January 29, 1972, and was originally broadcast on French TV. The concert marked the first time that Reed, Cale and Nico were on stage together after they left The Velvet Underground.

== Release ==
Though the recording had been bootlegged for years, Le Bataclan '72 was officially released on October 19, 2004, featuring two exclusive bonus tracks (both rehearsals—"Pale Blue Eyes" and "Candy Says"). Due to a problem with tape transfers, the speed is slow compared to the original concert. A speed-corrected version is on iTunes.

== Track listing ==
No.	Title	Writer(s)	Length
1.	"I'm Waiting for the Man"	Lou Reed	5:40
2.	"Berlin"	Reed	5:29
3.	"The Black Angel's Death Song"	Reed, John Cale	4:42
4.	"Wild Child"	Reed	6:12
5.	"Heroin"	Reed	7:10
6.	"Ghost Story"	Cale	3:27
7.	"The Biggest, Loudest, Hairiest Group of All"	Cale	3:56
8.	"Empty Bottles"	Cale	3:12
9.	"Femme Fatale"	Reed	4:56
10.	"No One Is There"	Nico	5:13
11.	"Frozen Warnings"	Nico	4:57
12.	"Janitor of Lunacy"	Nico	6:46
13.	"I'll Be Your Mirror"	Reed	2:29
14.	"All Tomorrow's Parties" (encore)	Reed	3:13
15.	"Pale Blue Eyes" (rehearsal)	Reed	2:09
16.	"Candy Says" (rehearsal)	Reed	1:43
Total length:			71:14

== Personnel ==
- Lou Reed – vocals, guitar
- John Cale – vocals, piano, guitar, viola
- Nico – vocals, harmonium
