= Street Hassle (song) =

Song by Lou Reed

from the album Street Hassle
- Released: February 1978
- Recorded: 1977
- Studio: Record Plant (New York City)
- Genre: Art rock
- Length: 10:56
- Label: Arista
- Songwriter: Lou Reed
- Producers: Lou Reed; Richard Robinson

Official audio
- "Street Hassle" on YouTube

"Street Hassle" is a song recorded by American rock musician Lou Reed for his eighth solo studio album of the same name (1978). It is 10 minutes and 56 seconds long and divided into three distinct sections: "Waltzing Matilda," "Street Hassle," and "Slipaway." Part one, "Waltzing Matilda," describes a transgender woman picking up and paying a male prostitute. In Part Two, "Street Hassle," a drug dealer speaks at length about the death of a woman in his apartment to her pimp. Part Three, "Slipaway," contains a brief, uncredited, spoken word section by singer-songwriter Bruce Springsteen referencing his 1975 song "Born to Run" (from 9:02 to 9:39) and a dirge sung by Reed about love and death. It was recorded in E major.

On the live album Animal Serenade (2004), Reed says: "I wanted to write a song that had a great monologue set to rock. Something that could have been written by William Burroughs, Hubert Selby, John Rechy, Tennessee Williams, Nelson Algren, maybe a little Raymond Chandler. You mix it all up and you have 'Street Hassle'."

Critics have described the song as being largely motivated by and representative of the end of Reed's three-year relationship with Rachel Humphreys, a trans woman who died in 1990, likely of AIDS, and was buried on Hart Island in the Bronx in the Potter's Field located on the island. Biographer Anthony DeCurtis summarized the song as "something of a requiem for Reed and Rachel's relationship." (DeCurtis also claimed that the second section of the song, "Street Hassle," was inspired by the mysterious 1975 death of Warhol performer and Max's Kansas City denizen Eric Emerson.) In a 1979 article for Rolling Stone, Mikal Gilmore refers to Rachel as the "raison d'être" for the entire album.

"Street Hassle" was included in 2008's The Pitchfork Media 500: Our Guide to the Greatest Songs from Punk to the Present.

Scottish rock band Simple Minds covered the song in an abbreviated version on their sixth studio album Sparkle in the Rain (1984), using two verses (the first and third) from the "Waltzing Matilda" section and a verse from the "Slipaway" section.

Street Hassle appears in Noah Baumbach's independent comedy-drama film The Squid and the Whale (2005), where it plays over the last scene and the end credits. It is included in the film's soundtrack. That same year, the song served as the leitmotif for Baker Skateboards' video "Baker 3".
