= Rotten Rita =

Rotten Rita (real name Kenneth C. Rapp) (May 6, 1938 - February 26, 2010) was an influential denizen of Andy Warhol's The Factory and was sometimes referred to as "The Mayor". Although he worked by day in a fabric store, he spent many nights at the Factory bringing his unique influences to encourage others to become artists. He was an opera aficionado, and also an alleged amphetamine dealer and user, and he touched the lives of many members of Warhol's artist collective. He was particularly close to another member, Brigid Berlin.

Warhol wrote about Rita in his 1980 memoir Popism: The Warhol Sixties. In one mention, Warhol recalled asking a mutual friend, Duchess, why Rita was known as "The Mayor" and received the reply 'Because he screws everybody in town'.

Rapp's alleged death in late 1991 (together with that of songwriter Doc Pomus by cancer) inspired Lou Reed, another famous Factory denizen, to compose his 1992 album Magic and Loss. Rapp, however, died February 26, 2010, in Irvington, New Jersey where he had lived in exile from the downtown drug scene since 1980. He had an opera show on local college radio and worked as a hot dog vendor at the Irvington bus station. Reed also makes mention of Rotten Rita in the song "Halloween Parade" on the 1989 album New York. Writing about his first year in New York City for the New York Times, in 2000, Reed recalled returning to find his apartment trashed, and the front door, "which hung off its hinges", had a poem by Rita carved into it.
