= Live: Take No Prisoners =

Live album by Lou Reed
- Released: November 1978
- Recorded: May 17–21, 1978
- Venue: The Bottom Line (New York City)
- Genre: Rock
- Length: 98:27
- Label: Arista
- Producer: Lou Reed

Lou Reed chronology
Street Hassle (1978)	Live: Take No Prisoners (1978)	The Bells (1979)

Live: Take No Prisoners is a 1978 live album by American rock musician Lou Reed, recorded during May 1978 at The Bottom Line in New York.

The album contains copious, often profane or non-sequitur stage patter by Reed during and between songs, including a detailed story of the origin of "Walk on the Wild Side" and a rant against rock music critics, particularly Robert Christgau.

== Recording ==
Live: Take No Prisoners was recorded during the series of albums where Lou Reed employed the use of a binaural recording setup, using a dummy head with microphones in each ear. The back cover of the album notes: "Produced by Lou Reed for Sister Ray Enterprises LTD. This is a binaural sound recording."

Bruce Springsteen, who acted as an uncredited vocalist on the studio version of the song "Street Hassle", was in the crowd during the recording of the live album. During the performance of "Walk on the Wild Side" featured on Take No Prisoners, Reed addresses Springsteen's presence in the crowd, saying, "Hi Bruce. Springsteen is alright, by the way. He gets my seal of approval. I think he's groovy."

Reed later said, "everybody said I never talk. I was in my home town of New York, so I talked...I thought of even titling it Lou Reed Talks, And Talks, And Talks... but we called it Take No Prisoners because we were doing a job, a phenomenal booking in a tiny hotel in Quebec. All of a sudden this drunk guy sitting alone at the front shouts, 'LOU!! MAN!! TAKE NO PRIS'NERS, LOU!!'. And then he took his head and smashed it as hard as he could to the drumbeat. And that was only halfway through!"

== Cover ==
The illustrations on the cover were officially credited to Brent Bailer but Spanish illustrator Nazario Luque won in 2000 a legal battle after which it was determined that the original drawing had been done by him for the cover of a magazine in the seventies. RCA was forced to pay Luque 4 million pesetas (around 24,000 euros/$27,000 USD). Luque has said that if Reed had ever asked him for permission to use his drawing, he would probably have given it for free.

== Reception ==
Professional ratings
Review scores
Source	Rating
AllMusic	2.5/5 stars
Chicago Tribune	2/4 stars
Christgau's Record Guide	C+

Alex Neilson, writing for The Wire said, "this is the album I chose to remember Reed by. Gratuitous, conflicted, corrupted by his own brilliance – but, like the judo master who uses his opponent’s strength against him, Reed harnesses these very ingredients to make something truly transcendent." Alternately, AllMusic said, "On the odd moments when Lou is focused enough to actually perform a song from start to finish (such as "Pale Blue Eyes" or "Coney Island Baby"), he's in fine form, sounding loose but enthusiastic, but those moments don't happen especially often." Robert Christgau said it was, "essentially a comedy record. Lenny Bruce is the obvious influence. And I thank Lou for pronouncing my name right."

== Track listing ==
All tracks written by Lou Reed.

Side one

1. "Sweet Jane" – 10:44
2. "I Wanna Be Black" – 6:27
3. "Satellite of Love" – 7:06

Side two

1. "Pale Blue Eyes" – 7:36
2. "Berlin" – 6:13
3. "I'm Waiting for the Man" / "Temporary Thing" – 13:59

Side three

1. "Coney Island Baby" – 8:37
2. "Street Hassle" – 13:15

Side four

1. "Walk on the Wild Side" – 16:54
2. "Leave Me Alone" – 7:29

== Personnel ==
- Lou Reed - vocals, guitar, Roland guitar synthesizer
- Stuart Heinrich - guitar, backing vocals
- Marty Fogel - electric saxophone
- Michael Fonfara - Yamaha electric piano
- Ellard "Moose" Boles - bass, backing vocals
- Michael Suchorsky - drums
- Angela Howell - tambourine, backing vocals
- Chrissy Faith - backing vocals

Technical

- Mixed and engineered by Manfred Schunke at Delta Studio, Wilster, Germany
- Audience engineer - Gregg Caruso, Jay W. Krugman, Julie Last
- Assistant engineer - René Tinner
- Mastered by Ted Jensen of Sterling Sound, New York
