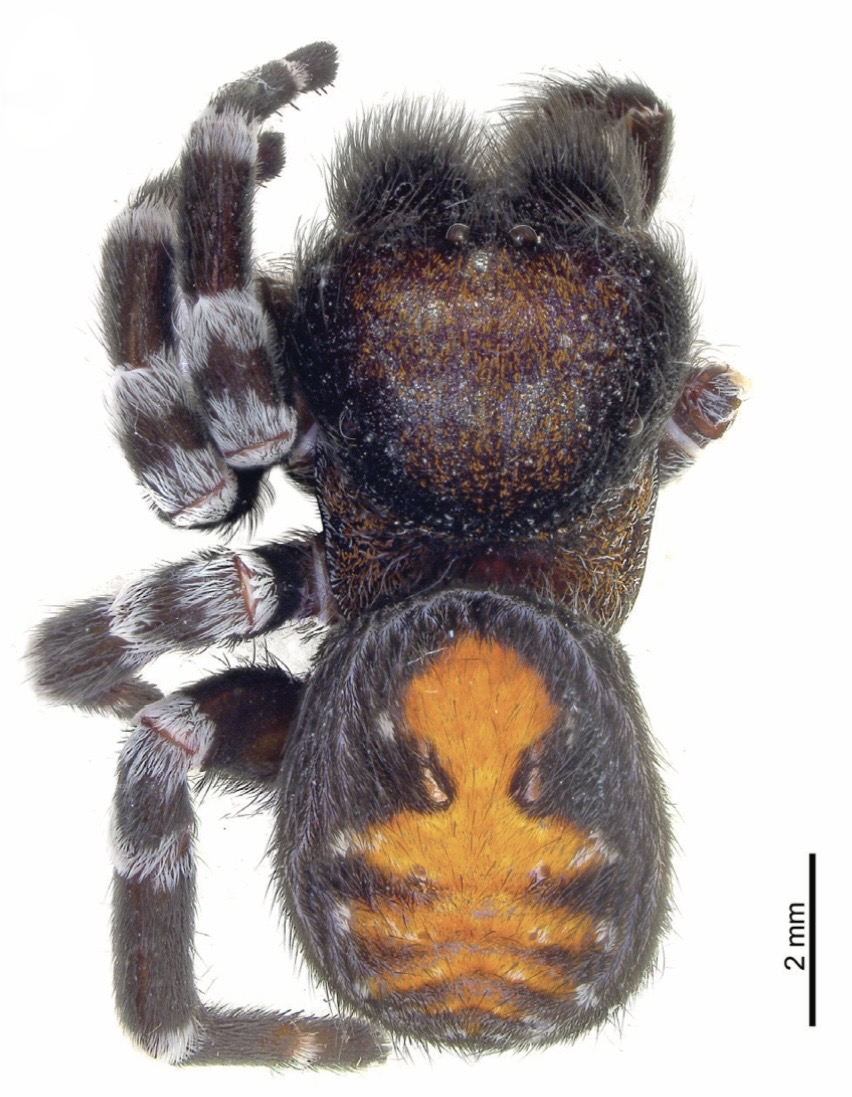

Scientific classification
- Kingdom: Animalia
- Phylum: Arthropoda
- Subphylum: Chelicerata
- Class: Arachnida
- Order: Araneae
- Infraorder: Araneomorphae
- Family: Eresidae
- Genus: Loureedia
- Species: L. melanconi

Binomial name
- Loureedia melanconi Szűts & Zamani, 2026

= Loureedia melanconi =

Species of spider

Loureedia melanconi is a species of velvet spider known only from the Eastern Province of northeastern Saudi Arabia. It is the only Loureedia species found in Saudi Arabia.

== Description ==
The male holotype has a total body length of 12.40 millimeters. The carapace is 6.55 millimeters long, 5.25 millimeters wide, and 3.80 millimeters high. The carapace, sternum, labium, chelicerae, and maxillae are dark walnut brown with a reddish shine. The anterior part of the carapace is densely covered with long black setae. The pars cephalica is covered with red scales and the pars thoracica is covered with red and scattered white setae.

The legs are covered with thin black setae. Distinct thick and dense bands of white setae are present at all leg joints. The patellae bear broad stripes of white setae on both ends, covering approximately 20 percent of the segment length. The abdomen is covered with black setae. The dorsal surface has a crimson red longitudinal foliate pattern with white spots at its lateral extensions. The anteriormost part of the median globular pattern is trilobed, with white lateral lobes and a crimson red anterior lobe. The spinnerets are black.

The male palpal bulb has a conductor stem that is approximately 1.5 times longer than wide. The prolateral margin of the conductor stem is straight and forms a right angle with the posterior margin. The retrolateral margin is slightly curved. The prolateral arm of the conductor is sharp tipped and slightly shorter than the blunt tipped retrolateral arm. The female of the species is unknown.

The prolateral arm of the conductor in Loureedia melanconi is strongly bent, a feature it shares with Loureedia phoenixi and Loureedia jerbae. It can be distinguished from L. phoenixi by its larger retrolateral arm of the conductor. It differs from L. jerbae by the apical curvature of the retrolateral conductor margin, which is curved rather than straight, and by the blunt tip of the retrolateral arm, which is pointed in L. jerbae. The male also differs from L. phoenixi in body coloration, particularly in lacking large white spots on the dorsal surface of the abdomen.

The general coloration of L. melanconi is similar to that of Loureedia maroccana and L. jerbae. However, the patellae of L. melanconi have broad white stripes on both ends, whereas L. maroccana and L. jerbae have only thin white stripes in these areas.

== Etymology ==
The species is named after Casey J. Melancon, an American avionics and aircraft electrical technician who collected the holotype while working in Saudi Arabia.

== Distribution ==
The species is known only from the type locality near the Aramco Tanajib Airport in the Eastern Province of Saudi Arabia.
