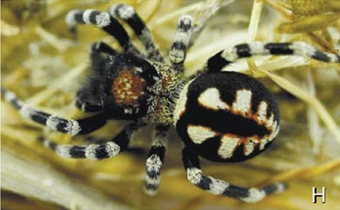
- Male L. annulipes

Scientific classification
- Kingdom: Animalia
- Phylum: Arthropoda
- Subphylum: Chelicerata
- Class: Arachnida
- Order: Araneae
- Infraorder: Araneomorphae
- Family: Eresidae
- Genus: Loureedia; Miller, Griswold, Scharff, Řezáč, Szűts & Marhabaie, 2012

Type species
- L. annulipes (Lucas, 1857)

= Loureedia =

Genus of spiders

Loureedia is a genus of velvet spiders that was first described by J. A. Miller in 2012. This genus of velvet spiders that live underground are named after Lou Reed, songwriter, guitarist and singer for the Velvet Underground. In 2020, researchers discovered the fourth species, L. phoenixi, in Iran; it is named after Joaquin Phoenix.

L. annulipes was formerly considered a member of Eresus.

== Species ==
- L. annulipes (Lucas, 1857) – Algeria, Tunisia, Libya, Egypt, Israel
- L. colleni Henriques, Miñano & Pérez-Zarcos, 2018 – Spain
- L. lucasi (Simon, 1873) – Morocco, Algeria
- L. melanconi Szűts & Zamani, 2026 – Saudi Arabia
- L. phoenixi Zamani et Marusik, 2020 – Iran

== See also ==
- List of organisms named after famous people (born 1925–1949)
