= Magic and Loss =

Studio album by Lou Reed
- Released: January 14, 1992
- Recorded: April 1–27, 1991
- Studio: Magic Shop, New York City
- Genre: Rock
- Length: 58:27
- Label: Sire
- Producer: Lou Reed, Mike Rathke

Lou Reed chronology
Songs for Drella (1990)	Magic and Loss (1992)	Walk on the Wild Side & Other Hits (1992)

Singles from Magic and Loss
- 1. "What's Good" Released: January 1992

Magic and Loss is the sixteenth solo studio album by American rock musician Lou Reed, released on January 14, 1992, by Sire Records. A concept album, it was Reed's highest-charting album on the UK Albums Chart, peaking at No. 6.

== Background ==
It's my dream album, because everything finally came together to where the album is finally fully realized. I got it to do what I wanted it to do, commercial thoughts never entered into it, so I'm just stunned.

— Lou Reed, explaining his satisfaction with the album.

Magic and Loss was originally intended to be primarily about themes of magic after hearing stories about magicians in Mexico. However, when tragedy struck during the writing process, Reed expanded the album's focus to themes of loss and death as well. Inspired in part by the illnesses and eventual deaths of two close friends, Magic and Loss was written for songwriter Doc Pomus, who had given Reed his start in the music business some 25 years earlier, and a woman Reed has identified as "Rita", popularly assumed to be Rotten Rita, who along with Reed was a familiar figure at Andy Warhol's studio, the Factory, in the mid-to-late '60s. Photographs of Pomus and a woman's face can be seen at the center of the lyric booklet included with the CD release.

Jazz singer Little Jimmy Scott performs backing vocals on track 3, "Power and Glory". Reed's live performance of the album filmed on March 18, 1992, at Pinewood Studios in London, England, was released on VHS and LaserDisc.

The single "What's Good"/"The Thesis", released in January, was Reed's second number-one hit (after "Dirty Blvd.") on the Billboard Modern Rock Tracks chart, occupying the top spot for 3 weeks. The 12" version of the release contained Reed's reading of "Harry's Circumcision" and "A Dream". A longer version of "What's Good" was previously released on the 1991 soundtrack album to the Wim Wenders film Until the End of the World.

== Critical reception ==
Professional ratings
Review scores
Source	Rating
AllMusic	3/5 stars
Chicago Tribune	4/4 stars
The Encyclopedia of Popular Music	4/5 stars
Entertainment Weekly	B−
NME	10/10
Orlando Sentinel	4/5 stars
Q	4/5 stars
Rolling Stone	4/5 stars
The Rolling Stone Album Guide	3/5 stars
Select	5/5

Magic and Loss was voted the 16th best album of the year in The Village Voice's annual Pazz & Jop critics poll for 1992. Robert Christgau, the poll's creator, disapproved of the voters' support of an album he felt was a "failed concept" marred by Reed's uninteresting views on death. In a positive review, Greg Kot of the Chicago Tribune said that the album shows "a great rocker at the peak of his powers: Striking tunes, gripping lyrics, honest emotion stripped of melodrama."

== Track listing ==
All tracks written by Lou Reed, except where noted.

Side one

1. "Dorita - The Spirit" – 1:07
2. "What's Good - The Thesis" – 3:22
3. "Power and Glory - The Situation" (Lou Reed, Mike Rathke) – 4:23
4. "Magician - Internally" – 6:23
5. "Sword of Damocles - Externally" – 3:42
6. "Goodby Mass - In a Chapel Bodily Termination" – 4:25
7. "Cremation - Ashes to Ashes" – 2:54
8. "Dreamin' - Escape" (Reed, Rathke) – 5:07

Side two

1. "No Chance - Regret" – 3:15
2. "Warrior King - Revenge" – 4:27
3. "Harry's Circumcision - Reverie Gone Astray" – 5:28
4. "Gassed and Stoked - Loss" (Reed, Rathke) – 4:18
5. "Power and Glory, Part II - Magic - Transformation" (Reed, Rathke) – 2:57
6. "Magic and Loss - The Summation" (Reed, Rathke) – 6:39

== Personnel ==
Credits are adapted from the Magic and Loss liner notes.

Musicians

- Lou Reed – vocals, acoustic guitar, electric guitar
- Mike Rathke – guitar
- Rob Wasserman – bass guitar
- Michael Blair – drums, percussion, backing vocals
- Roger Moutenot – backing vocals
- Little Jimmy Scott – backing vocals on "Power and Glory – The Situation"

Artwork

- Spencer Drate, Judith Salavetz, Sylvia Reed – album design
- Louis Jammes – photography

== Charts ==
Chart performance for Magic and Loss
Chart (1992)	Peak position
Australian Albums (ARIA)	56
Austrian Albums (Ö3 Austria)	9
Dutch Albums (Album Top 100)	11
German Albums (Offizielle Top 100)	17
New Zealand Albums (RMNZ)	20
Norwegian Albums (VG-lista)	10
Swedish Albums (Sverigetopplistan)	9
Swiss Albums (Schweizer Hitparade)	10
UK Albums (OCC)	6
US Billboard 200	80
