= Walk on the Wild Side: The Best of Lou Reed =

Greatest hits album by Lou Reed
- Released: April 1977
- Recorded: January 5, 1972 – October 18, 1975
- Genre: Rock
- Length: 41:37
- Label: RCA Victor

Lou Reed chronology
Rock and Roll Heart (1976)	Walk on the Wild Side: The Best of Lou Reed (1977)	Street Hassle (1978)

Walk on the Wild Side: The Best of Lou Reed is the first greatest hits compilation by Lou Reed, formerly of the Velvet Underground. It was issued by RCA Records after Reed's first contract with them ended in 1976. Issued on compact disc on October 25, 1990, the album cover features photos by Mick Rock of Reed and then-girlfriend Rachel Humphreys.

== Critical reception ==
Professional ratings
Review scores
Source	Rating
AllMusic	4.5/5 stars
Christgau's Record Guide	A−

William Ruhlmann of AllMusic writes, "Reed has been a prolific artist, and this album captures only a fraction of his catalog, but he is actually less eclectic as a rule than this collection makes him seem, so the result is an excellent introduction."

== Track listing ==
All tracks are written by Lou Reed.

No.	Title	Original album	Length
1.	"Satellite of Love"	Transformer (1972)	3:39
2.	"Wild Child"	Lou Reed (1972)	4:37
3.	"I Love You"	Lou Reed (1972)	2:18
4.	"How Do You Think It Feels"	Berlin (1973)	3:08
5.	"New York Telephone Conversation"	Transformer	1:32
6.	"Walk on the Wild Side"	Transformer	4:13
7.	"Sweet Jane" (Live)	Rock 'n' Roll Animal (1974)	4:29
8.	"White Light/White Heat" (Live)	Rock 'n' Roll Animal	5:01
9.	"Sally Can't Dance"	Single version (1974)	2:53
10.	"Nowhere at All"	"Charley's Girl" single (1976)	3:11
11.	"Coney Island Baby"	Coney Island Baby	6:36
Total length:			41:37

- Track information and credits adapted from the album's liner notes.
