= Loureedia phoenixi =

Scientific classification
- Kingdom: Animalia
- Phylum: Arthropoda
- Subphylum: Chelicerata
- Class: Arachnida
- Order: Araneae
- Infraorder: Araneomorphae
- Family: Eresidae
- Genus: Loureedia
- Species: L. phoenixi

Binomial name
- Loureedia phoenixi Zamani & Marusik, 2020

Species of spider

Loureedia phoenixi is a species of spider discovered in Iran in 2020. It is a velvet spider and is described as reclusive. The species is named after American musician Lou Reed and actor Joaquin Phoenix, as its color pattern resembles the appearance of the DC Comics character Joker as portrayed by Phoenix in the 2019 film Joker. It is the first species of its genus found outside the Mediterranean basin, over 1,500 kilometers from the previously known range.

== See also ==
- List of organisms named after famous people (born 1950–1974)
- Spiders
