= Animal Serenade =

Live album by Lou Reed
- Released: March 23, 2004
- Recorded: June 24, 2003
- Genre: Rock
- Length: 128:00
- Label: Sire; Reprise
- Producer: Lou Reed; Fernando Saunders

Lou Reed chronology
The Raven (2003)	Animal Serenade (2004)	Le Bataclan '72 (2004)

Professional ratings
Aggregate scores
Source	Rating
Metacritic	71/100
Review scores
Source	Rating
AllMusic	4.5/5 stars
Blender	4/5 stars
Entertainment Weekly	B+
Drowned in Sound	5/10
Filter	84%
Mojo	3/5 stars
Pitchfork	6.5/10
Q	3.5/5 stars
Rolling Stone	3/5 stars
Uncut	7/10

Animal Serenade is a live album by American rock musician Lou Reed, recorded in Los Angeles at the Wiltern Theatre in 2003 after The Raven. The show features a drummer-less band (including Mike Rathke on guitar/synth, bassist, vocalist Fernando Saunders, and the cello of Jane Scarpantoni). In addition, Anohni, of Antony and the Johnsons fame, contributes background vocals throughout and sings the lead on "Set the Twilight Reeling" and "Candy Says".

Fernando Saunders plays bass and other instruments. He did background vocals on most songs and sang lead vocals on "Tell It to Your Heart" and "Reviens Cherie", scat on "Sunday Morning".

Three songs were performed during the concert that did not appear on the album: "Sweet Jane", "The Last Shot" and "Perfect Day" (sung in duet with Anohni). "Sweet Jane" is available by digital download.

== Track listing ==
All tracks composed by Lou Reed; except where indicated

=== Disc one ===
1. "Advice" - 2:07
2. "Smalltown" (Reed, John Cale) - 6:04
3. "Tell It to Your Heart" - 6:03
4. "Men of Good Fortune" - 4:27
5. "How Do You Think It Feels" - 8:09
6. "Vanishing Act" - 5:31
7. "Ecstasy" - 7:09
8. "The Day John Kennedy Died" - 4:04
9. "Street Hassle" - 6:59
10. "The Bed" - 5:15
11. "Reviens Cherie" (Fernando Saunders) - 7:12
12. "Venus in Furs" - 10:02

=== Disc two ===
1. "Dirty Blvd." - 6:54
2. "Sunday Morning" (Reed, John Cale) - 5:04
3. "All Tomorrow's Parties" - 6:18
4. "Call on Me" - 2:45
5. "The Raven" - 9:33
6. "Set the Twilight Reeling" - 9:08
7. "Candy Says" - 6:04
8. "Heroin" - 9:11

== Personnel ==
- Lou Reed - vocals, electric & acoustic guitar
- Mike Rathke - electric & acoustic guitar, Ztar synthesizer, guitar synthesizer
- Fernando Saunders - electric & acoustic bass, Roland drums, guitar, backing vocals, vocals on "Tell It to Your Heart" & "Reviens Cherie", scat on "Sunday Morning"
- Jane Scarpantoni - cello
- Anohni - vocals on "Call on Me", "Set the Twilight Reeling" & "Candy Says", backing vocals
- John Bishop - f.o.h.
- Bill Bentley - executive producer
- Biff Dawes - recording engineer
