= Hudson River Wind Meditations =

Studio album by Lou Reed
- Released: April 24, 2007
- Recorded: 2006
- Studio: Animal Lab, New York City
- Genre: Ambient; new-age
- Length: 67:46
- Label: Sounds True
- Producer: Lou Reed; Hal Willner

Lou Reed chronology
Le Bataclan '72 (2004)	Hudson River Wind Meditations (2007)	The Creation of the Universe (2008)

Professional ratings
Review scores
Source	Rating
AllMusic	3.5/5 stars
Pitchfork	8.4/10
Prefix Magazine	8.0/10

Hudson River Wind Meditations is the twentieth and final solo studio album by American musician Lou Reed, released in April 2007 by Sounds True. Hal Willner and Reed produced the album, a collection of meditational music intended to relax the body, mind and spirit, adjunct to tai chi and bodywork. It is a departure from his regular rock output.

It is named for the Hudson River in New York City. The cover photograph is also by Reed.

== Track listing ==
All tracks are written by Lou Reed.

Hudson River Wind Meditations track listing
No.	Title	Length
1.	"Move Your Heart"	28:54
2.	"Find Your Note"	31:35
3.	"Hudson River Wind (Blend the Ambiance)"	1:50
4.	"Wind Coda"	5:23
Total length:		67:46

== Personnel ==
Credits are adapted from the Hudson River Wind Meditations liner notes.

- Lou Reed – arrangements

Production

- Lou Reed – executive co-producer; mixing; photography (album front cover)
- Hal Willner – executive co-producer; mixing (at Animal Lab, NYC)
- Héctor Castillo – mixing (at Animal Lab, NYC)
- Timothy Greenfield-Sanders – photography (Lou Reed portrait, album back cover)
- Emily Lazar – mastering engineer (at The Lodge, Greenwich Village)
- Mark Mahaney – photo assistance
- Chad Morgan – package design
- Karen Polaski – package design

== Charts ==
Chart performance for Hudson River Wind Meditations
Chart (2024)	Peak position
UK Independent Albums (OCC)	34
