= The Creation of the Universe =

Live album by Lou Reed
- Released: December 22, 2008
- Recorded: 2008
- Genre: Experimental; industrial; ambient; noise
- Length: 1:50:46
- Label: Best Seat in the House Productions

Lou Reed chronology
Berlin: Live at St. Ann's Warehouse (2008)	The Creation of the Universe (2008)	Lulu (2011)

The Creation of the Universe is an album by Lou Reed's Metal Machine Trio. The trio was formed in 2008 with Ulrich Krieger and Sarth Calhoun to play music inspired by Reed's 1975 album Metal Machine Music. The first concerts of the group were on October 2 and 3, 2008, at REDCAT in Los Angeles. The group was named Metal Machine Trio only after these concerts. The concert itself was announced as Lou Reed and Ulrich Krieger: Unclassified. The CD is the unedited live recording of both nights. It is available in a variety of formats from Lou Reed's website including, MP3, FLAC, 2 Disk CD and Deluxe CD. Cover and inlay photos are by Lou Reed.

The music on both CDs is freely improvised and without vocals and song structures. It ranges from dark ambient passages to noise, free rock and electronica.

== Track listing ==
1. "Night 1" – 54:57
2. "Night 2" – 55:49

== Personnel ==
- Lou Reed – guitars, electrics
- Ulrich Krieger – tenor saxophone, live-electronics
- Sarth Calhoun – Continuum fingerboard, live processing
