= Lola Schnabel =

American artist

Lola Schnabel is an American artist. She is the daughter of artist Julian Schnabel.

In 2011, Schnabel exhibited her paintings in a show titled "Love Before Intimacy" at the Hole Gallery on the Bowery.

In 2012, Schnabel launched the Capsule Collection for Sportmax.

In 2023, Schnabel exhibited ceramic candleholders at the Nilufar Gallery in Milan. Also that year, Schnabel exhibited her ceramic-based paintings and sculptures in a show titled "Cirica" at her brother Vito Schnabel's New York gallery.
