= Coney Island Baby =

Studio album by Lou Reed
- Released: December 1975
- Recorded: October 18–28, 1975
- Studios: Mediasound, New York City
- Genre: Soft rock
- Length: 35:15
- Label: RCA Victor
- Producers: Lou Reed and Godfrey Diamond

Lou Reed chronology
Metal Machine Music (1975)	Coney Island Baby (1975)	Rock and Roll Heart (1976)

Coney Island Baby is the sixth solo album by the American rock musician Lou Reed, released by RCA Records in December 1975.

== Music and lyrics ==
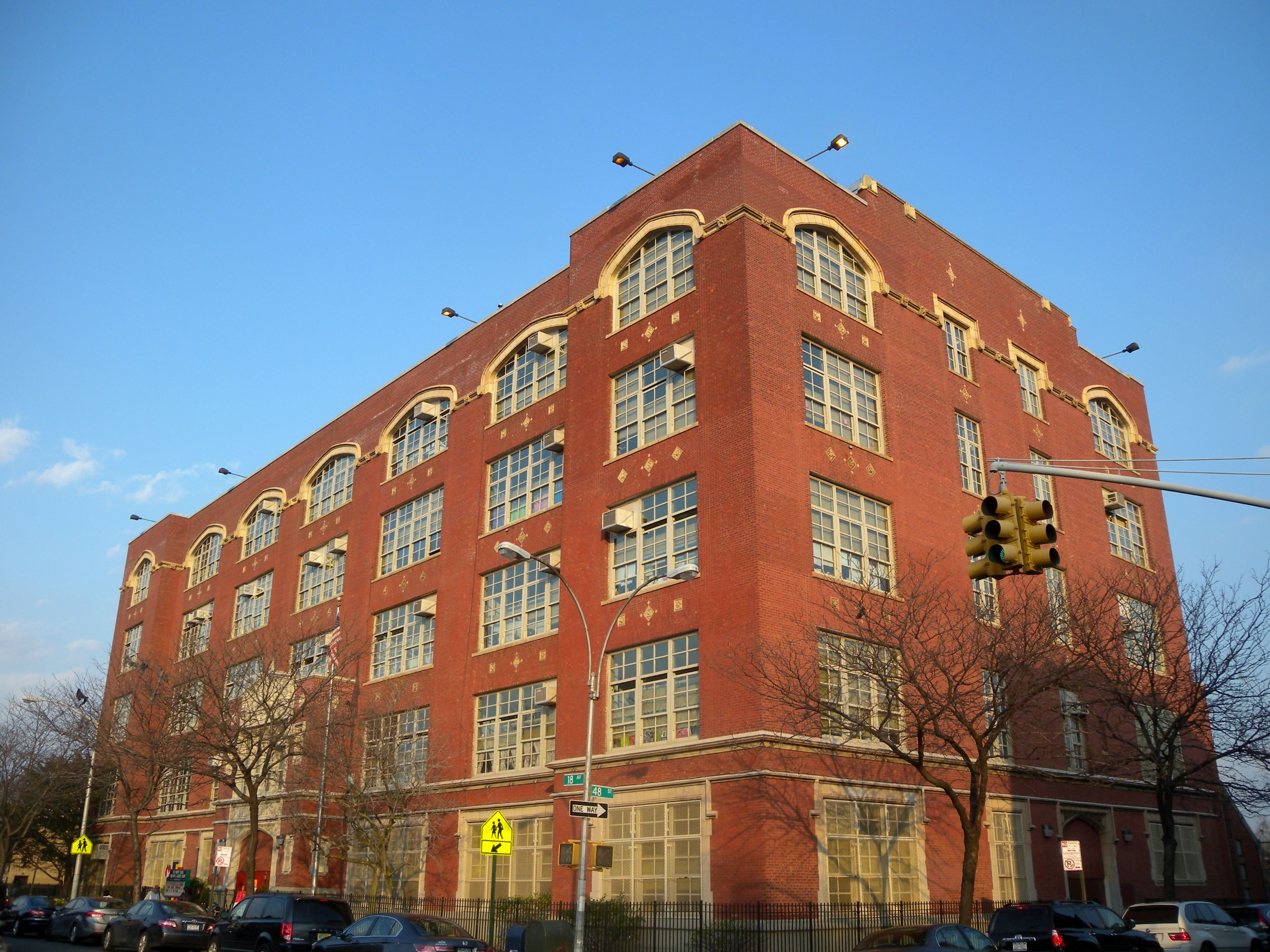
P.S. 192 – Magnet School for Math & Science Inquiry, in Brooklyn

The album has been described by Anthony DeCurtis as "perhaps the most romantic album of Reed's career". Many of the album's songs were inspired by and dedicated to Reed's girlfriend and muse at the time, Rachel Humphreys. According to Aidan Levy, Coney Island Baby was "as much a love letter to Rachel as it was to the nostalgic Coney Island of the mind."

The album's title track directly references Rachel with the line: "I'd like to send this one out to Lou and Rachel, and all the kids at P.S. 192." "P.S. 192" was at that time was a public school for kindergarten to 6th grade, in Brooklyn, New York City, NY, where Reed went to school before moving to Freeport, on Long Island, New York. In 1979 Reed said "Saying 'I'm a Coney Island baby' at the end of that song is like saying I haven't backed off an inch. And don't you forget it." It is a direct continuation of the poem "The Coach and Glory of Love", written by Reed and published in the Fall 1971 edition of The Harvard Advocate.

The album includes the song "She's My Best Friend", a version of which was originally recorded by Reed's band the Velvet Underground in 1969, and eventually released on the 1985 compilation album VU. The 30th-anniversary re-issue of Coney Island Baby includes bonus tracks featuring Reed's Velvet Underground bandmate Doug Yule.

== Critical reception ==
Retrospective professional ratings
Review scores
Source	Rating
AllMusic	4.5/5 stars
Blender	2.5/5 stars
Chicago Tribune	3/4 stars
Christgau's Record Guide	B+
Encyclopedia of Popular Music	4/5 stars
The Guardian	4/5 stars
Pitchfork	8.5/10
Q	4/5 stars
The Rolling Stone Album Guide	4/5 stars
Spin Alternative Record Guide	7/10

Reviewing for Rolling Stone in 1976, Paul Nelson wrote, "For the eight superb songs on Coney Island Baby, Reed assembled the best band he has performed with since the Velvet Underground. Michael Suchorsky's versatile, controlled drumming is especially praiseworthy, and Reed himself has even managed to rekindle his intense, individualistic guitar playing of the late Sixties. Better yet, he has shelved his recent FM-DJ vocal style in favor of confident, expressive singing. The songs themselves—as structured and melodic as any Reed has written — are timeless, terrific rock & roll, and the strength of the genre is accentuated by the simplicity and logic of crisp, tactile production (by Reed and Godfrey Diamond) and careful, resourceful arrangements which emphasize both electric and acoustic guitars and inventive background vocals."

In Christgau's Record Guide: Rock Albums of the Seventies (1981), Robert Christgau said of the record, "At first it's gratifying to ascertain that he's trying harder, but very soon that old cheapjack ennui begins to poke through. Oddly, though, most of the cheap stuff is near the surface—the songs sound warmer when you listen close. And not even in his most lyrical moments with the Velvets has he let his soft side show as nakedly as it does on the title cut."

For the entry on Reed in Rock: The Rough Guide (1996), Roy Edroso highlighted Coney Island Baby as "the most pleasing of Reed's soft-rock albums" and said, "His sense of humour has never been better than on 'A Gift', and the title track reminds you why Jonathan Richman idolized Reed: who else would have had the nerve to try to find 'the glory of love' in the reveries of a troubled would-be high-school football player (in doo-wop style, no less)?".

In NME, Charles Shaar Murray said, "Lou Reed's revolutionary days are long gone, and the years of his farthood lie heavy upon him."

== Track listing ==
All tracks are written by Lou Reed.

Side one
No.	Title	Length
1.	"Crazy Feeling"	2:56
2.	"Charley's Girl"	2:36
3.	"She's My Best Friend"	6:00
4.	"Kicks"	6:06

Side two
No.	Title	Length
1.	"A Gift"	3:47
2.	"Ooohhh Baby"	3:45
3.	"Nobody's Business"	3:41
4.	"Coney Island Baby"	6:46
Total length:		35:15

30th Anniversary Edition Bonus Tracks
No.	Title	Length
1.	"Nowhere at All" (recorded November 18 and 21, 1975 at Mediasound Studios, New York City)	3:17
2.	"Downtown Dirt" (recorded January 3 and 4, 1975 at Electric Lady Studios, New York City)	4:18
3.	"Leave Me Alone" (recorded October 19 and 20, 1975 at Mediasound Studios)	5:35
4.	"Crazy Feeling" (recorded January 3 and 4, 1975 at Electric Lady Studios)	2:39
5.	"She's My Best Friend" (recorded January 4, 1975 at Electric Lady Studios)	4:08
6.	"Coney Island Baby" (recorded January 6, 1975 at Electric Lady Studios)	5:41

"Nowhere at All" was released as the B-side to "Charley's Girl".

== Personnel ==
Musicians

- Lou Reed – vocals, guitar, piano
- Bob Kulick – guitar
- Bruce Yaw – electric and acoustic bass
- Michael Suchorsky – drums
- Godfrey Diamond, Michael Wendroff – backing vocals
- Doug Yule – bass guitar on bonus tracks 2, 4–6, guitar on bonus tracks 4–6
- Bob Meday – drums on bonus tracks 2, 4–6
- Michael Fonfara – keyboards on bonus tracks 2, 4–6

Production and artwork

- Lou Reed – production, mixing
- Godfrey Diamond – production, engineering, mixing
- Michael Wendroff – mixing
- José Rodriguez – mastering
- Acy Lehman – art direction
- Mick Rock – photography

== Charts ==
Chart performance for Coney Island Baby
Chart (1976)	Peak position
Australian Albums (Kent Music Report)	25
Dutch Albums (Album Top 100)	4
New Zealand Albums (RMNZ)	16
Swedish Albums (Sverigetopplistan)	23
UK Albums (Official Charts)	52
US Billboard 200	41
