= Rachel Humphreys =

American muse, hairstylist, and tour manager

- Portrait of Rachel Humphreys featured on the back cover of Lou Reed's 1974 album, Sally Can't Dance, in illustration by David Edward Byrd. Humphreys is depicted reflected in Reed's sunglasses.
- Born: October 18, 1952
- Died: January 30, 1990 (aged 37); Manhattan, New York, U.S.
- Burial place: Potter's field, Hart Island, New York, U.S.
- Partner: Lou Reed (1973–1978)

Rachel Humphreys (October 18, 1952 – January 30, 1990) was an American muse and romantic partner to musician Lou Reed. A transgender woman, Humphreys inspired lyrics, songs and artwork by Reed, and accompanied him on the road as a hairdresser and tour manager during the mid-1970s.

== Early life ==
She was born and raised in Bridgeton, New Jersey, and San Antonio, Texas. Humphreys was of Mexican Native descent, and her sister Gail Garcia told Reed biographer Aidan Levy: "We knew since [Rachel] was little [she] was gay. [She] used to like to play with Barbie dolls and dress up in girls' clothes." Humphreys eventually identified as a trans woman. Reed biographer Howard Sounes wrote that Humphreys' "childhood had been tough", and that she was "streetwise in a way that Lou only pretended to be".

Humphreys attended cosmetology school in Bayonne, New Jersey, and may have lived in Philadelphia at some point before meeting Reed. By the early 1970s, Humphreys regularly alternated between using the names Rachel, Richard, and Ricky.

== Relationship with Reed ==
Humphreys and Reed met at Club 82 in Greenwich Village in New York; Reed was instantly attracted to her. Reed later described their first meeting at a club in Greenwich Village: "I'd been up for days, as usual, and everything was at that superreal, glowing stage. I walked in there, and there was this amazing person, the incredible head, kind of vibrating out of it all. Rachel was wearing this amazing makeup and dress and I was obviously in a different world to anyone else in the place. Eventually I spoke and she came home with me."

Their relationship lasted from 1973 to early 1978, and they lived together as a couple for most of that time. The pair lived at the Gramercy Park Hotel before settling in an apartment on East 52nd Street. They adopted two dachshunds named Duke and Baron. Humphreys used both male and female pronouns at different times, and both enjoyed wearing each other’s clothes.

Humphreys would do Reed's hair on his tours, would sometimes come onstage during his performances, and was credited as Reed's road manager in 1976. One member of their tour party recalled that Reed and Humphreys would often destroy their hotel rooms: "They were so fucking blitzed they would rip the carpet off the floor, the wallpaper off the walls... They were shooting speed, and the crash off of that is nasty."

Humphreys is featured in an illustration (by David Edward Byrd) on the back cover of Reed's 1974 album Sally Can't Dance. Humphreys is depicted reflected in Reed's sunglasses, and is credited in the liner notes as "René de la Bush". Humphreys also served as the inspiration for certain songs on Reed's 1975 album Coney Island Baby. The title track ends with the lyrics: "I'd like to send this one out to Lou and Rachel, and all the kids at [Public School] 192. Man, I'd swear, I'd give the whole thing up for you." Photos of the couple also appear on the cover of the 1977 compilation Walk on the Wild Side: The Best of Lou Reed.

In 1977, the pair had a public third anniversary party, which some of their friends interpreted as an informal wedding ceremony. The same year, the relationship began fraying when Humphreys began considering gender reassignment surgery, to which Reed was adamantly opposed. Reed biographer Aidan Levy quotes a friend of Rachel's as saying: "There would be a discussion about sex change operations, and every time Rachel would be scheduled to do that—that’s what Lou wanted, as far as Rachel would say—then Lou would back off and say, ‘Well why are you doing that? I love you because of the way you are.'" The same friend reported that the conversations eventually made Humphreys feel suicidal, and a number of friends characterized their relationship as mutually abusive (both physically and emotionally).

Humphreys and Reed's relationship concluded sometime during 1978. In 1977, Reed met Sylvia Morales, with whom he soon began a relationship and would marry in 1980. The last time the two were known to have seen one another was in early 1979 when Humphreys briefly attended one of Reed's band practices, returning a leather bag containing some of the musician's belongings.

== Later life ==
Reed did not often publicly speak of Humphreys following their breakup, and little is known about her life after the couple's separation.

Noted rock critic Lester Bangs, who was a friend of Reed's then-guitarist Robert Quine, often wrote negatively about Rachel during his tenure as editor of Creem. Shortly after Bangs' death in the spring of 1982, Quine said that Reed told him: "'That's too bad about your friend.' But then he launches into a forty-five minute attack on Lester," largely focusing on the way the writer had treated Rachel in the press. The guitarist says Reed told him: "Do you understand, Quine—this is a person I was close to. And he is calling her a creature and 'thing.'" Quine stated that the conversation regarding Humphreys and Bangs ultimately ended the pair's friendship, and was a rare instance in which Reed acknowledged Humphreys after the end of their relationship.

In Notes From the Velvet Underground, Howard Sounes wrote that around 1988, as the AIDS epidemic was gripping New York, Reed's former guitarist Jeff Ross had a chance encounter with Humphreys:

"[Ross] heard someone call his name and turned around. 'It’s Rachel, who looks pretty much the same except very gaunt … a very gaunt transvestite, and embarrassingly she told me she was [living] under the [West Side] Highway and homeless at the time. We chatted for a minute. We had a hug. I headed off, being very sad.' Others who also saw Rachel in a poor state on the streets believe that [she] died shortly thereafter. [She] would have been in [her] early forties, at most. Like so much about [her] life, it is impossible to be sure."

== Death ==
Humphreys died January 30, 1990, at age 37, in the Hell's Kitchen section of Manhattan. Although Humphreys's official cause of death remains unknown, she died at Saint Clare's Hospital, an institution that specialized in helping those with AIDS during the HIV/AIDS epidemic. Humphreys was buried on February 16, 1990, in Potter's Field on Hart Island, off the coast of the Bronx, alongside thousands of other individuals who died during the AIDS epidemic.

== Legacy ==
Humphreys' role in Reed's life is subject to continuing interest from music and popular culture journalists. Beginning in the 1990s, Humphreys' relationship with Reed was depicted in a number of books, including Victor Bockris' Transformer: The Lou Reed Story (1995); Legs McNeil and Gillian McCain's Please Kill Me: The Uncensored Oral History of Punk (1996); Howard Sounes' Notes from the Velvet Underground (2015); Anthony DeCurtis' Lou Reed: A Life (2017); and Talking Heads drummer Chris Frantz's autobiography Remain in Love (2020).

Actor Michael Imperioli published a novel in 2018 titled The Perfume Burned His Eyes, in which a young man moves from Queens to Manhattan, befriending Reed and Humphreys in the process.
