= Rock and Roll Heart =

Studio album by Lou Reed
- Released: November 1976
- Recorded: 1976
- Studio: The Record Plant (New York City)
- Genre: Rock; pop
- Length: 37:42
- Label: Arista
- Producer: Lou Reed

Lou Reed chronology
Coney Island Baby (1975)	Rock and Roll Heart (1976)	Walk on the Wild Side: The Best of Lou Reed (1977)

Singles from Rock and Roll Heart
- 1. "I Believe in Love" Released: November 1976 (US); 2. "Rock and Roll Heart" Released: April 22, 1977 (UK); 3. "Chooser and the Chosen One" Released: 1977 (France)

Professional ratings
Review scores
Source	Rating
AllMusic	2/5 stars
Chicago Tribune	2/4 stars
Christgau's Record Guide	B−

Rock and Roll Heart is the seventh solo studio album by American rock musician Lou Reed, released in November 1976. It was his first album for Arista Records after record mogul Clive Davis reportedly rescued him from bankruptcy. "A Sheltered Life" dates back to 1967, when the Velvet Underground recorded a demo of it (available on 1995's Peel Slowly and See). The Velvet Underground also performed "Follow the Leader", and a live recording of it was released on The Quine Tapes (2001).

The cover art is credited to Mick Rock.

== Track listing ==
All tracks are written by Lou Reed.

Side One
No.	Title	Length
1.	"I Believe in Love"	2:45
2.	"Banging on My Drum"	2:03
3.	"Follow the Leader"	2:08
4.	"You Wear It So Well" (Featuring Garland Jeffreys)	4:30
5.	"Ladies Pay"	4:15
6.	"Rock and Roll Heart"	3:00

Side Two
No.	Title	Length
7.	"Chooser and the Chosen One"	2:45
8.	"Senselessly Cruel"	2:03
9.	"Claim to Fame"	2:37
10.	"Vicious Circle"	2:47
11.	"A Sheltered Life"	2:15
12.	"Temporary Thing"	5:19
Total length:		37:42

== Personnel ==
Musicians

- Lou Reed – vocals, guitar, piano
- Michael Fonfara – piano, clavinet, organ, ARP synthesizer
- Bruce Yaw – bass
- Michael Suchorsky – drums
- Marty Fogel – saxophone
- Garland Jeffreys – backing vocals on "You Wear It So Well"

Production and artwork

- Lou Reed – producer, mixing
- Corky Stasiak – engineer, mixing
- Jay Krugman – assistant engineer, mixing
- Tony Bridge – mastering
- Joe Brescio – mastering
- Mick Rock – cover design, photography
- Julie Harris – art direction
- Steve Ridgeway – art direction

== Charts ==
Chart(1976)	Peak Position
Australia (Kent Music Report)	68
Dutch Album Chart	24
