= Lou Reed =

American rock musician (1942–2013)

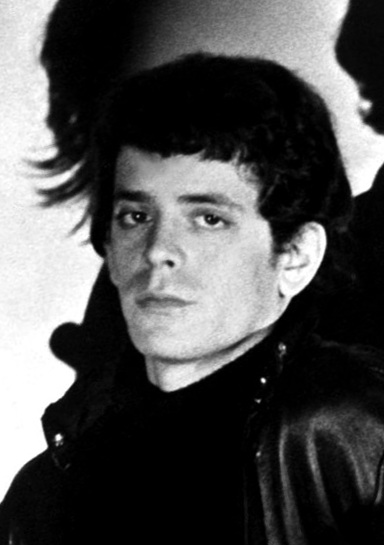
- Reed in 1966

Background information
- Born: Lewis Allan Reed; March 2, 1942; New York City, U.S.
- Origin: Freeport, New York, U.S.
- Died: October 27, 2013 (aged 71) East Hampton, New York, U.S.
- Genres: Art rock; glam rock; experimental rock; proto-punk; garage rock; doo-wop
- Occupations: Musician; singer; songwriter; composer; photographer
- Instruments: Vocals; guitar
- Works: Solo; with the Velvet Underground
- Years active: 1958–2013
- Labels: Pickwick; Verve; MGM; Cotillion; RCA; Arista; Sire; Warner Bros.
- Formerly of: The Jades; The Primitives; The Velvet Underground; Metal Machine Trio
- Spouses: Bettye Kronstad (m. 1973; div. 1973) Sylvia Morales (m. 1980; div. 1994) Laurie Anderson (m. 2008)

Lewis Allan Reed (March 2, 1942 – October 27, 2013) was an American musician, singer, songwriter, and poet. He was the guitarist, lead singer, and principal songwriter for the rock band the Velvet Underground and had a solo career that spanned five decades. Although not commercially successful during its existence, the Velvet Underground came to be regarded as one of the most influential bands in the history of underground and alternative rock music. Reed's distinctive deadpan voice, poetic and transgressive lyrics, and experimental guitar playing were trademarks throughout his long career.

Reed began his musical career in 1964 as a pop songwriter for Pickwick Records. Reed, John Cale, Sterling Morrison, and Angus MacLise formed the Velvet Underground in 1965. After building a reputation in the avant garde music scene, the Velvet Underground gained the attention of Andy Warhol, who became the band's manager. The Velvet Underground became something of a fixture at The Factory, Warhol's art studio, and served as his "house band" for various projects. The band released its first album, now with drummer Moe Tucker and featuring German singer Nico, in 1967, and parted ways with Warhol shortly thereafter. Following several lineup changes and three further albums, Reed quit the band in 1970.

After leaving the Velvet Underground, Reed embarked on a successful solo career, releasing twenty solo studio albums. His second album, Transformer (1972), was produced by David Bowie and arranged by Mick Ronson; it brought him mainstream recognition. The album is considered an influential landmark of the glam rock genre, anchored by Reed's most successful single, "Walk on the Wild Side". The less commercial but critically acclaimed Berlin peaked at No. 7 on the UK Albums Chart. Rock 'n' Roll Animal (a live album released in 1974) sold strongly, and Sally Can't Dance (1974) peaked at No. 10 on the Billboard 200. When Reed's work ceased to sell well, his drug addiction and alcoholism intensified. Reed achieved sobriety in the early 1980s, gradually returning to prominence with The Blue Mask (1982) and New Sensations (1984). He reached a critical and commercial career peak with his 1989 album New York.

Reed participated in the re-formation of the Velvet Underground in the 1990s. He also made several more albums, including Songs for Drella (1990), a song cycle about Warhol made in collaboration with Cale. Magic and Loss (1992) would become Reed's highest-charting album on the UK Albums Chart, peaking at No. 6. He contributed music to two theatrical interpretations of 19th-century writers, one of which he developed into an album titled The Raven. Reed was inducted into the Rock and Roll Hall of Fame as a member of the Velvet Underground in 1996 and as a solo artist in 2015.

== Biography ==
=== 1942–1957: Early life ===
Lewis Allan Reed was born on March 2, 1942, at Beth-El Hospital (now Brookdale University Hospital and Medical Center) in Brownsville, Brooklyn, New York City, and grew up in suburban Freeport, New York, on Long Island where he felt isolated and was bullied at school. (Note: Contrary to some sources, his birth name was Lewis Allan Reed, not Louis Firbanks, a name that was coined as a joke by Lester Bangs in Creem magazine.) Reed was the son of Toby (née Futterman) (1920–2013) and Sidney Joseph Reed (1913–2005), an accountant. His family was Jewish; his grandparents were Russian and Polish Jews who had immigrated to the United States in the first decade of the 20th century, fleeing antisemitism; his father had changed his surname from Rabinowitz to Reed.

Reed attended Atkinson Elementary School in Freeport and went on to Freeport Junior High School. His sister Merrill, born Margaret Reed, said that as an adolescent, he suffered panic attacks, became socially awkward, and "possessed a fragile temperament", but was highly focused on things that he liked, mainly music. Having learned to play the guitar from the radio, he developed an early interest in rock and roll and rhythm and blues music, and played in several garage bands while in high school.

Reed was dyslexic. He began using drugs at the age of 16.

=== 1958–1964: Early recordings and education ===
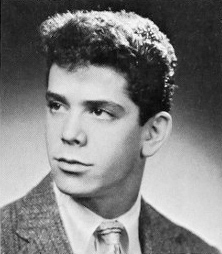
Reed as a high school senior, 1959

Reed's first recording was as a member of a doo-wop trio called the Jades, with Reed providing guitar accompaniment and backing vocals. After participating in a talent show at Freeport Junior High School in early 1958 and receiving an enthusiastic response from the audience, the group was given the chance to record an original single, "So Blue" / "Leave Her for Me", later that year. While the single did not chart, notable saxophonist King Curtis was brought in as a session musician by the producer Bob Shad to play on both songs, as well as guitarist Mickey Baker (according to Reed in a 2009 interview) and the single was played by a substitute DJ during the Murray the K radio show, which gave Reed his first-ever airplay. Reed's love for playing music and his desire to play gigs brought him into confrontation with his anxious and unaccommodating parents.

His sister recalled that during his first year in college, at New York University, he was brought home one day, having had a mental breakdown, after which he remained "depressed, anxious, and socially unresponsive" for a time, and that his parents were having difficulty coping. Visiting a psychologist, Reed's parents were made to feel guilty as inadequate parents, and they consented to giving him electroconvulsive therapy (ECT). Reed appeared to blame his father for the treatment to which he had been subjected. He wrote about the experience in his song "Kill Your Sons" from the album Sally Can't Dance (1974). Reed recalled the experience as having been traumatic and leading to memory loss. He believed that he was treated in this fashion to dispel his homosexual feelings; after Reed's death, his sister denied this, asserting that their parents were not homophobic but had been told by his doctors that ECT was necessary to treat his mental and behavioral issues.

Upon his recovery from his illness and associated treatment, Reed resumed his education at Syracuse University in 1960, studying journalism, film directing, and creative writing. He was a platoon leader in the Reserve Officers' Training Corps; he said he was later expelled from the program for holding an unloaded gun to his superior's head.

Reed played music on campus under numerous band names (one being L.A. and the Eldorados) and played throughout Central New York. Per his bandmates, they were routinely kicked out of fraternity parties for their brash personalities and insistence on performing their own material. In 1961, he began hosting a late-night radio program on WAER called Excursions on a Wobbly Rail. Named after a song by jazz pianist Cecil Taylor from his 1959 album Looking Ahead!, the program typically featured doo-wop, rhythm and blues, and jazz, particularly the free jazz developed in the mid-1950s. Reed said that when he started out he was inspired by free jazz saxophonist Ornette Coleman, who had "always been a great influence" on him; he said that his guitar playing on the Velvet Underground track "European Son" was his way of trying to imitate Coleman.

Reed's sister said that during her brother's time at Syracuse University, the university authorities had tried unsuccessfully to expel him because they did not approve of his extracurricular activities. At Syracuse, he studied under poet Delmore Schwartz, who he said was "the first great person I ever met", and they became friends. He credited Schwartz with showing him how "with the simplest language imaginable, and very short, you can accomplish the most astonishing heights." One of Reed's fellow students at Syracuse in the early 1960s (who also studied under Schwartz) was the musician Garland Jeffreys; they remained close friends until the end of Reed's life.

Jeffreys recalled Reed's time at Syracuse: "At four in the afternoon we'd all meet at [the bar] The Orange Grove. Me, Delmore and Lou. That would often be the center of the crew. And Delmore was the leader – our quiet leader." While at Syracuse, Reed was also introduced to intravenous drug use for the first time, and quickly contracted hepatitis. Reed later dedicated the song "European Son", from the first Velvet Underground album, to Schwartz. In 1982, Reed recorded "My House" from his album The Blue Mask as a tribute to his late mentor. He later said that his goals as a writer were "to bring the sensitivities of the novel to rock music" or to write the Great American Novel in a record album. Reed met Sterling Morrison, an English student at the City University of New York, while the latter was visiting mutual friend Jim Tucker at Syracuse. Reed graduated from Syracuse University's College of Arts and Sciences with a Bachelor of Arts degree cum laude in English in June 1964.

=== 1964–1970: Pickwick and the Velvet Underground ===
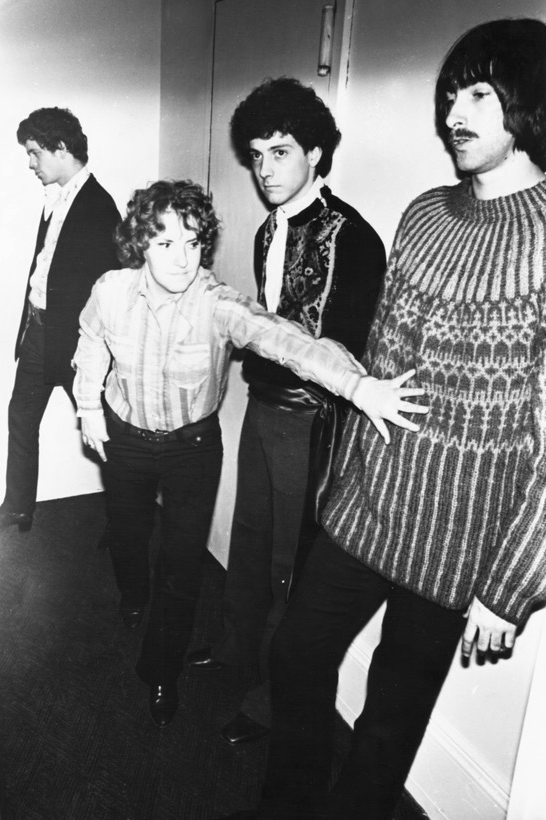
The Velvet Underground, 1968 (left to right: Reed, Tucker, Yule, Morrison)

Reed moved to New York City in 1964 to work as an in-house songwriter for Pickwick Records. He can be heard singing lead on two cuts on The Surfsiders Sing The Beach Boys Songbook. For Pickwick, Reed also wrote and recorded the single "The Ostrich", a parody of popular dance songs of the time, which included lines such as "put your head on the floor and have somebody step on it". His employers felt that the song had hit potential, and assembled a supporting band to help promote the recording. The ad hoc band, called the Primitives, consisted of Reed; Welsh musician John Cale, who had recently moved to New York to study music and was playing viola in composer La Monte Young's Theatre of Eternal Music, on bass; Tony Conrad, violinist in the Theatre of Eternal Music, on guitar; and sculptor Walter De Maria on percussion. Cale and Conrad were surprised to find that for "The Ostrich", Reed tuned each string of his guitar to the same note, which they began to call "ostrich guitar" tuning. This technique created a drone effect similar to their experimentation in Young's avant-garde ensemble. Though disappointed with Reed's performance in the Primitives, Cale was nevertheless impressed by Reed's early repertoire (including "Heroin"), and a partnership began to evolve.

Reed and Cale (who played viola, keyboards, and bass guitar) lived together on the Lower East Side, and invited Reed's college acquaintance Sterling Morrison and Cale's neighbor and Theatre of Eternal Music bandmate Angus MacLise to join the band on guitar and drums respectively, thus forming the Velvet Underground. When the opportunity came to play their first paying gig at Summit High School in Summit, New Jersey, MacLise quit because he believed that accepting money for art was selling out. He was replaced by Moe Tucker, the sister of Reed and Morrison's mutual friend Jim Tucker. Initially a fill-in for that one show, she soon became a full-time member with her drumming an integral part of the band's sound, despite Cale's initial objections to having a female drummer. Though the Velvet Underground had little commercial success in their time, the band is considered one of the most influential in rock history. Reed was the main singer and songwriter in the band.

Had [Reed] accomplished nothing else, his work with the Velvet Underground in the late sixties would assure him a place in anyone's rock & roll pantheon; those remarkable songs still serve as an articulate aural nightmare of men and women caught in the beauty and terror of sexual, street and drug paranoia, unwilling or unable to move. The message is that urban life is tough stuff—it will kill you; Reed, the poet of destruction, knows it but never looks away and somehow finds holiness as well as perversity in both his sinners and his quest. ... [H]e is still one of a handful of American artists capable of the spiritual home run.

— Rolling Stone, 1975

The band soon came to the attention of Andy Warhol, who became their manager. One of Warhol's first contributions was to integrate them into his Exploding Plastic Inevitable multimedia events. Warhol's associates at the Factory inspired many of Reed's songs as he fell into a thriving, multifaceted artistic scene. Reed rarely gave an interview without paying homage to Warhol as a mentor. Warhol also pushed the band to work with the German former model and singer Nico. Despite his initial resistance, Reed wrote several songs for Nico to sing, and the two were briefly lovers.

The Velvet Underground & Nico was released in March 1967 and peaked at No. 171 on the U.S. Billboard 200. Much later, Rolling Stone listed it as the 13th greatest album of all time; musician Brian Eno once stated that although few people bought the album at the time of its release, most of those who did were inspired to form their own bands. Václav Havel credited the album, which he bought while visiting the U.S., with inspiring him to become president of Czechoslovakia.

By the time the band recorded White Light/White Heat (1968), Nico had quit the band and Warhol had been fired, both against Cale's wishes. Warhol's replacement as their manager was Steve Sesnick. In September 1968, Reed told Morrison and Tucker that he would dissolve the band if they did not let him fire Cale; they agreed, and Reed had Morrison dismiss Cale from the band. Morrison and Tucker were discomfited by Reed's tactics but remained in the band. Cale's replacement was Boston-based musician Doug Yule, who played bass guitar and keyboards and would soon share lead vocal duties with Reed. The band now took on a more pop-oriented sound and acted more as a vehicle for Reed to develop his songwriting craft. They released two studio albums with this lineup: 1969's The Velvet Underground and 1970's Loaded. Reed left the Velvet Underground in August 1970. The band disintegrated after Morrison and Tucker departed the following year, and their final album Squeeze (1973) was almost entirely Yule's work.

=== 1970–1975: Glam rock and commercial breakthrough ===
After leaving the Velvet Underground, Reed moved to his parents' home on Long Island and took a job at his father's tax accounting firm as a typist, by his own account earning $40 a week ($332 in 2025 dollars). He began writing poetry, which was published later in 2018 by Anthology Editions through the Lou Reed Estate. He signed a recording contract with RCA Records in 1971 and recorded his first solo album at Morgan Studios in Willesden, London, with session musicians including Steve Howe and Rick Wakeman of the English progressive rock band Yes. The album, Lou Reed, contained versions of unreleased Velvet Underground songs, some of which had originally been recorded for Loaded but shelved. (Note: Some later appeared on the Peel Slowly and See box set.) This album was overlooked by most pop music critics and did not sell well, although music critic Stephen Holden, in Rolling Stone, called it an "almost perfect album. ... which embodied the spirit of the Velvets." Holden went on to compare Reed's voice with those of Mick Jagger and Bob Dylan and praise the poetic quality of his lyrics.

Reed's commercial breakthrough album, Transformer, was released in November 1972. The glam rock-influenced album was co-produced by David Bowie and Mick Ronson, and it introduced Reed to a wider audience, especially in the UK. The single "Walk on the Wild Side" was a tribute to several Warhol superstars, describing in turn Holly Woodlawn (verse one), Candy Darling (verse two), "Little Joe" Dallesandro (verse three), "Sugar Plum Fairy" Joe Campbell (verse four), and Jackie Curtis (verse five). The song's transgressive lyrics evaded radio censorship. Though the song's jazzy arrangement (courtesy of bassist Herbie Flowers and saxophonist Ronnie Ross) was atypical for Reed, "Walk on the Wild Side" became a signature song. It came about as a result of a commission to compose a soundtrack to a theatrical adaptation of Nelson Algren's novel of the same name; the play failed to materialize. "Walk on the Wild Side" was Reed's only entry in the Billboard Hot 100 singles chart, peaking at No. 16.

Ronson's arrangements brought out new aspects of Reed's songs. "Perfect Day", for example, features delicate strings and soaring dynamics. It was rediscovered in the 1990s and allowed Reed to drop "Walk on the Wild Side" from his concerts.

Reed hired a local New York bar-band, the Tots, to tour in support of Transformer and spent much of 1972 and early 1973 on the road with them. Though they improved over the months, Reed (with producer Bob Ezrin's encouragement) decided to recruit a new backing band in anticipation of the upcoming Berlin album. He chose keyboardist Moogy Klingman to come up with a new five-member band on barely a week's notice.

Berlin (1973) was a concept album about two amphetamine addicts in love in the city. The songs variously concern domestic violence ("Caroline Says I", "Caroline Says II"), drug addiction ("How Do You Think It Feels"), adultery and prostitution ("The Kids"), and suicide ("The Bed"). Reed's late 1973 European tour, featuring lead guitarists Steve Hunter and Dick Wagner, mixed his Berlin material with older numbers. Response to Berlin at the time of its release was generally negative, with Rolling Stone pronouncing it "a disaster". Reed found the poor reviews it received disheartening. Since then the album has been critically reevaluated, and in 2003 Rolling Stone included it in their list of the 500 greatest albums of all time. Berlin peaked at No. 7 on the UK Albums Chart.

Following the critical and commercial disappointment of Berlin, Reed befriended Steve Katz of Blood, Sweat & Tears (brother of his then-manager Dennis Katz), who suggested Reed put together a "great live band" and release a live album of Velvet Underground songs. Katz would come on board as producer, and the album Rock 'n' Roll Animal (1974) contained live performances of the Velvet Underground songs "Sweet Jane", "Heroin", "White Light/White Heat", and "Rock and Roll". Wagner's live arrangements, and Hunter's instrumental intro to "Sweet Jane" (which opened the album), gave Reed's songs the live rock sound he was looking for, and the album peaked at No. 45 on the Billboard 200 for 28 weeks and soon became Reed's biggest selling album. (Note: Rock 'n' Roll Animal and its follow-up Lou Reed Live (1975) were both recorded at the Academy of Music, New York City, on December 21, 1973.) It went gold in 1978, with 500,000 certified sales.

Sally Can't Dance, released in August 1974, became Reed's highest-charting album in the United States, peaking at No. 10 during a 14-week stay on the Billboard 200 album chart in October 1974.

In October 2019, an audio tape of publicly unknown music by Reed, based on Warhol's 1975 book, The Philosophy of Andy Warhol: From A to B and Back Again, was reported to have been discovered in an archive at The Andy Warhol Museum in Pittsburgh.

=== 1975–1979: Addiction and creative work ===
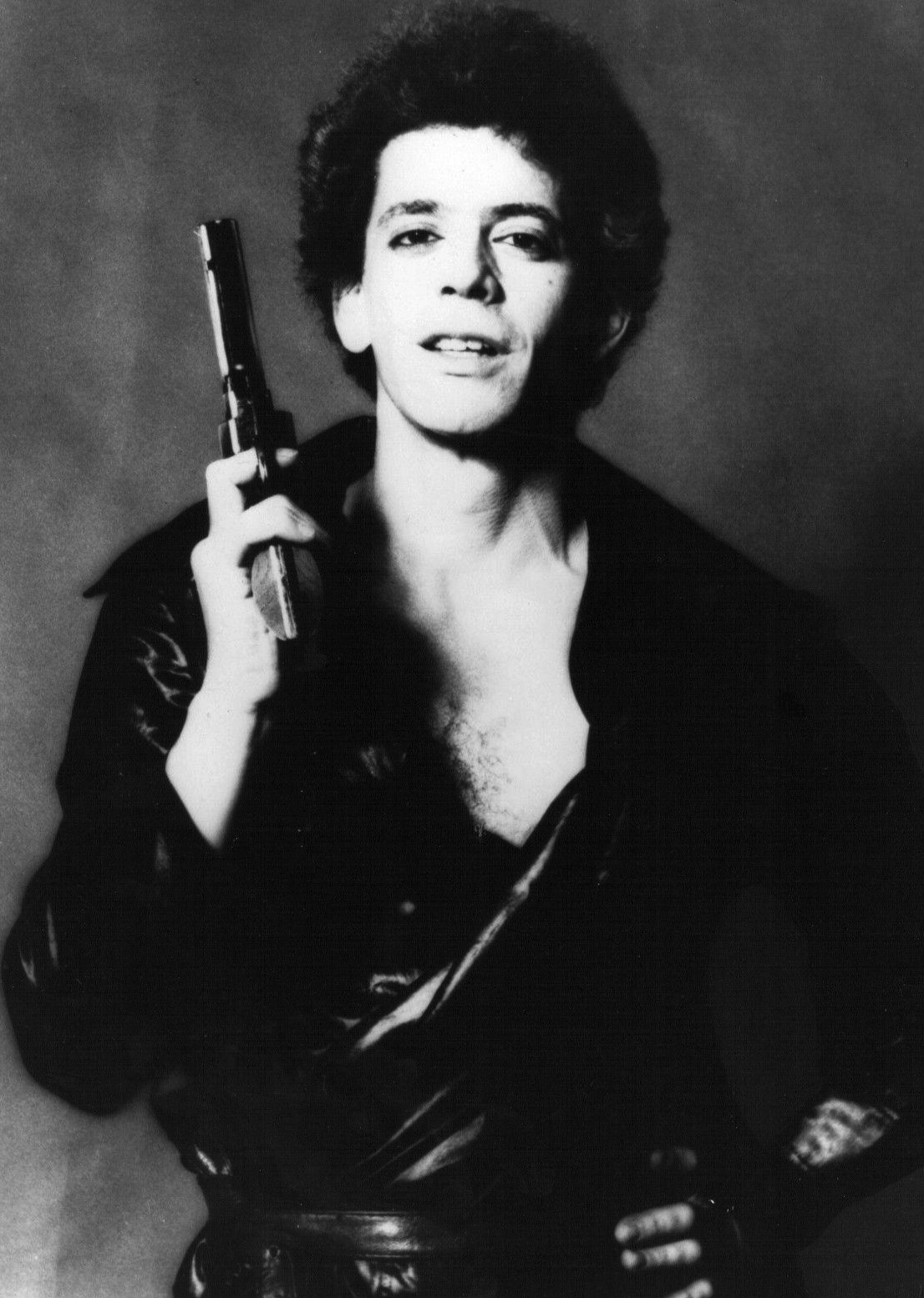
Reed in 1977

Throughout the 1970s, Reed was a heavy user of methamphetamine and alcohol. In the summer of 1975, he was booked to headline Startruckin' 75 in Europe, a touring rock festival organized by Miles Copeland. However, Reed's addiction made him unreliable and he never performed on the tour, causing Copeland to replace him with Ike & Tina Turner.

Reed's double album Metal Machine Music (1975) was an hour-long collage of manipulated recordings of feedback and effects. Described by Rolling Stone as the "tubular groaning of a galactic refrigerator", many critics interpreted it as a gesture of contempt, an attempt to break his contract with RCA or to alienate his less sophisticated fans. Reed claimed that the album was a genuine artistic effort inspired by the drone music of La Monte Young, and suggested that references to classical music could be found buried in the feedback; he also said that "anyone who gets to side four is dumber than I am." Lester Bangs declared it "genius", though also psychologically disturbing. The album, now regarded as a visionary work by some critics, was reportedly returned to stores by the thousands, and was withdrawn after a few weeks.

Lou Reed doesn't just write about squalid characters, he allows them to leer and breathe in their own voices, and he colors familiar landscapes through their own eyes. In the process, Reed has created a body of music that comes as close to disclosing the parameters of human loss and recovery as we're likely to find. That qualifies him, in my opinion, as one of the few real heroes rock & roll has raised.

— Mikal Gilmore, Rolling Stone, (1979)

1975's Coney Island Baby was dedicated to Reed's then-partner Rachel Humphreys, a transgender woman Reed dated and lived with for three years. Humphreys also appears in the photos on the cover of Reed's 1977 greatest hits album Walk on the Wild Side: The Best of Lou Reed. Rock and Roll Heart was his 1976 debut for his new record label Arista, and Street Hassle (1978) was released in the midst of the punk rock scene he had helped to inspire. Reed took on a watchful, competitive and sometimes dismissive attitude towards punk. Aware that he had inspired the scene, he regularly attended shows at CBGB to track the artistic and commercial development of numerous punk bands, and a cover illustration and interview of Reed appeared in the first issue of Punk magazine by Legs McNeil.

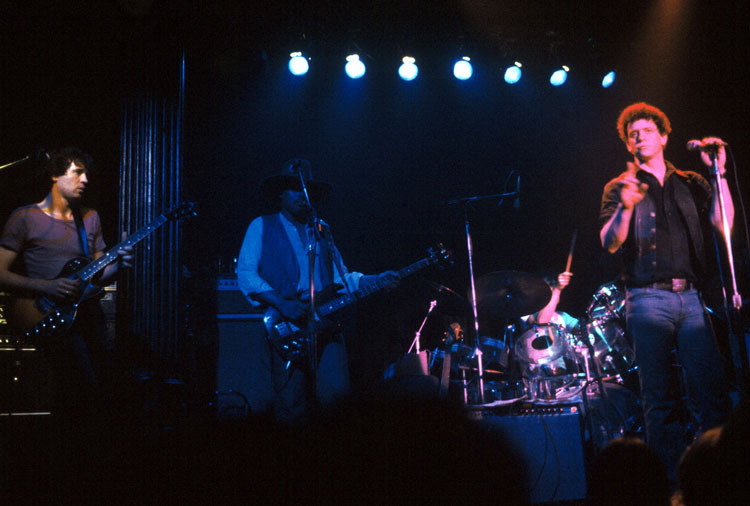
Reed performing onstage with guitarist Chuck Hammer, June 1979, The Bottom Line, New York City

Reed released his third live album, Live: Take No Prisoners, in 1978; some critics thought it was his "bravest work yet", while others considered it his "silliest". Rolling Stone described it as "one of the funniest live albums ever recorded" and felt that its songs "serve merely as backdrops for Lou's dark-humored, Lenny Bruce-like monologues." Reed felt it was his best album to date. The Bells (1979) featured jazz trumpeter Don Cherry, who had played extensively with Reed's idol Ornette Coleman. During 1979, Reed toured extensively in Europe and the United States, performing a wide range of songs, including a suite of core songs from Berlin and the title track from The Bells featuring Chuck Hammer on guitar synthesizer. From around 1979, Reed began to wean himself off drugs. After a show at the Hammersmith Odeon in London that year, Bowie and Reed fell out during a late-night meeting which led to Reed hitting Bowie. Bowie had reportedly told Reed that he would have to "clean up his act" if they were to work together again. (Note: The two reconciled years later, and Reed performed with Bowie at the latter's 50th birthday concert at Madison Square Garden in 1997.)

=== 1980–1989: Mid-period ===
In 1980, Reed appeared as a record producer in the film One-Trick Pony, written by and starring Paul Simon. Reed's marriage to designer Sylvia Morales that year inspired him to write several songs, particularly "Think It Over" from 1980's Growing Up in Public and "Heavenly Arms" from 1982's The Blue Mask. The latter album was enthusiastically received by critics such as Rolling Stone writer Tom Carson, who called it "a great record, and its genius is at once so simple and unusual that the only appropriate reaction is wonder. Who expected anything like this from Reed at this late stage of the game?" In the Village Voice, Robert Christgau called The Blue Mask "his most controlled, plainspoken, deeply felt, and uninhibited album." After Legendary Hearts (1983) and New Sensations (1984), Reed was sufficiently reestablished as a public figure to become a spokesman for Honda scooters. In the early 1980s, Reed worked with guitarists including Chuck Hammer on Growing Up in Public, and Robert Quine on The Blue Mask and Legendary Hearts.

Reed's 1984 album New Sensations marked the first time that Reed had charted within the US Top 100 since Street Hassle, and the first time that Reed had charted in the UK since 1976's Coney Island Baby. Although its lead single "I Love You, Suzanne" only charted at No. 78 on the UK Singles Chart it did receive light rotation on MTV. Two more singles were released from the album: "My Red Joystick" and the Dutch-only release "High in the City", but they both failed to chart.

In 1998, The New York Times observed that in the 1970s, Reed had a distinctive persona: "Back then he was publicly gay, pretended to shoot heroin onstage, and cultivated a 'Dachau panda' look, with cropped peroxide hair and black circles painted under his eyes." The newspaper wrote that in 1980, "Reed renounced druggy theatrics, even swore off intoxicants themselves, and became openly heterosexual, openly married."

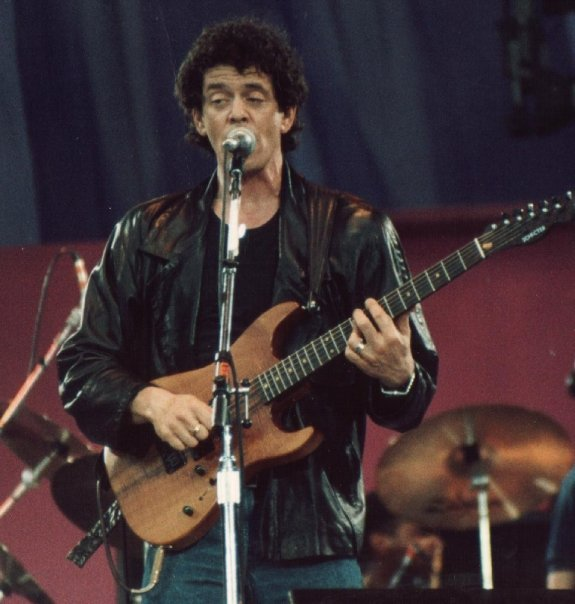
Reed performing live at the Conspiracy of Hope benefit concert at Giants Stadium in East Rutherford, New Jersey, 1986

On September 22, 1985, Reed performed at the first Farm Aid concert in Champaign, Illinois. He performed "Doin' the Things That We Want To", "I Love You, Suzanne", "New Sensations" and "Walk on the Wild Side" as his solo set. In June 1986, Reed released Mistrial (co-produced with bassist Fernando Saunders). To support the album, he released two music videos: "No Money Down" and "The Original Wrapper". In the same year, he joined Amnesty International's A Conspiracy of Hope tour and was outspoken about New York City's political issues and personalities. He also participated in the Artists United Against Apartheid project organized by Steven Van Zandt, which recorded the anti-apartheid charity single "Sun City" in 1985.

Reed's 1989 album New York, which commented on crime, HIV/AIDS, civil rights activist Jesse Jackson, then-President of Austria Kurt Waldheim, and Pope John Paul II, was universally acclaimed by critics and became his second gold-certified work when it passed 500,000 sales in 1997. Reed was nominated for a Grammy Award for Best Male Rock Vocal Performance for the album.

=== 1990–1999: Velvet Underground reunion and various projects ===
Reed met John Cale for the first time in several years at Andy Warhol's funeral in 1987. They worked together on the album Songs for Drella (1990), a song cycle about Warhol. On the album, Reed sings of his love for his late friend, and criticizes both the doctors who were unable to save Warhol's life and Warhol's would-be assassin Valerie Solanas. In 1990, the first Velvet Underground lineup reformed at a Fondation Cartier benefit show by Cale and Reed in France. In June and July 1993, the Velvet Underground again reunited and toured Europe, including an appearance at the Glastonbury Festival 1993; plans for a North American tour were canceled following a dispute between Reed and Cale.

Reed released his sixteenth solo album, Magic and Loss, in January 1992. The album is focused on mortality, inspired by the death of two close friends from cancer. In 1994, he appeared in A Celebration: The Music of Pete Townshend and The Who. In 1995, Reed made a cameo appearance in the canceled video game Penn & Teller's Smoke and Mirrors: if the player selects the "impossible" difficulty setting, Reed appears shortly after the game begins as an unbeatable boss. After defeating the player, he says: "This is the impossible level, boys. Impossible doesn't mean very difficult, very difficult is winning the Nobel Prize, impossible is eating the sun."

The Velvet Underground were inducted into the Rock and Roll Hall of Fame in 1996. At the ceremony, Reed, Cale and Tucker performed a song titled "Last Night I Said Goodbye to My Friend", dedicated to Sterling Morrison, who had died the previous August. In February 1996, Reed released Set the Twilight Reeling, and later that year, Reed contributed songs and music to Time Rocker, a theatrical interpretation of H. G. Wells' novella The Time Machine by director Robert Wilson. The piece premiered in the Thalia Theater, Hamburg, and was later also shown at the Brooklyn Academy of Music.

In 1997, the BBC created a version of "Perfect Day" which featured many artists, including Reed. Initially created for advertising purposes, it was later released as a charity single for Children in Need and became a UK no.1 single.

At the Sundance Film Festival in February 1997, the Timothy Greenfield-Sanders documentary Lou Reed: Rock & Roll Heart had its world premiere and was nominated for the Grand Jury Prize. The film then screened at the Berlin International Film Festival and numerous other festivals. It aired on PBS as part of the documentary seriesAmerican Masters in 1998. Featured interviewees included David Bowie, Patti Smith, David Byrne, and Jim Carroll. The film and Reed won a Grammy Award in 1999 for Best Long Form Music Video.

=== 2000–2012: Rock and ambient experimentation ===
In February 2000, Reed worked with Robert Wilson at the Thalia Theater again, on POEtry, another production inspired by the works of a 19th-century writer, this time Edgar Allan Poe. In April 2000, Reed released Ecstasy. In January 2003, Reed released a 2-CD set, The Raven, based on POEtry. The album consists of songs written by Reed and spoken-word performances of reworked and rewritten texts of Edgar Allan Poe by actors, set to electronic music composed by Reed. It features Willem Dafoe, David Bowie, Steve Buscemi, and Reed's idol Ornette Coleman. A single disc CD version of the album, focusing on the music, was also released. (Note: In 2011, Reed developed the CD into an illustrated book, with art by Lorenzo Mattotti, published by Fantagraphics.)

In May 2000, Reed performed before Pope John Paul II at the Great Jubilee Concert in Rome. In 2001, Reed made a cameo appearance in the film adaptation of Prozac Nation. On October 6, 2001, The New York Times published Reed's "Laurie Sadly Listening", a poem in which he reflects on the September 11 attacks. Incorrect reports of Reed's death were broadcast by numerous U.S. radio stations in 2001, caused by a hoax email (purporting to be from Reuters) which said he had died of a drug overdose. In April 2003, Reed began a world tour featuring the cellist Jane Scarpantoni and singer Anohni.

In 2003, Reed released a book of photographs, Emotions in Action. This comprised an A4-sized book called Emotions and a smaller one called Actions laid into its hard cover. In January 2006, he released a second book of photographs, Lou Reed's New York. A third volume, Romanticism, was released in 2009.

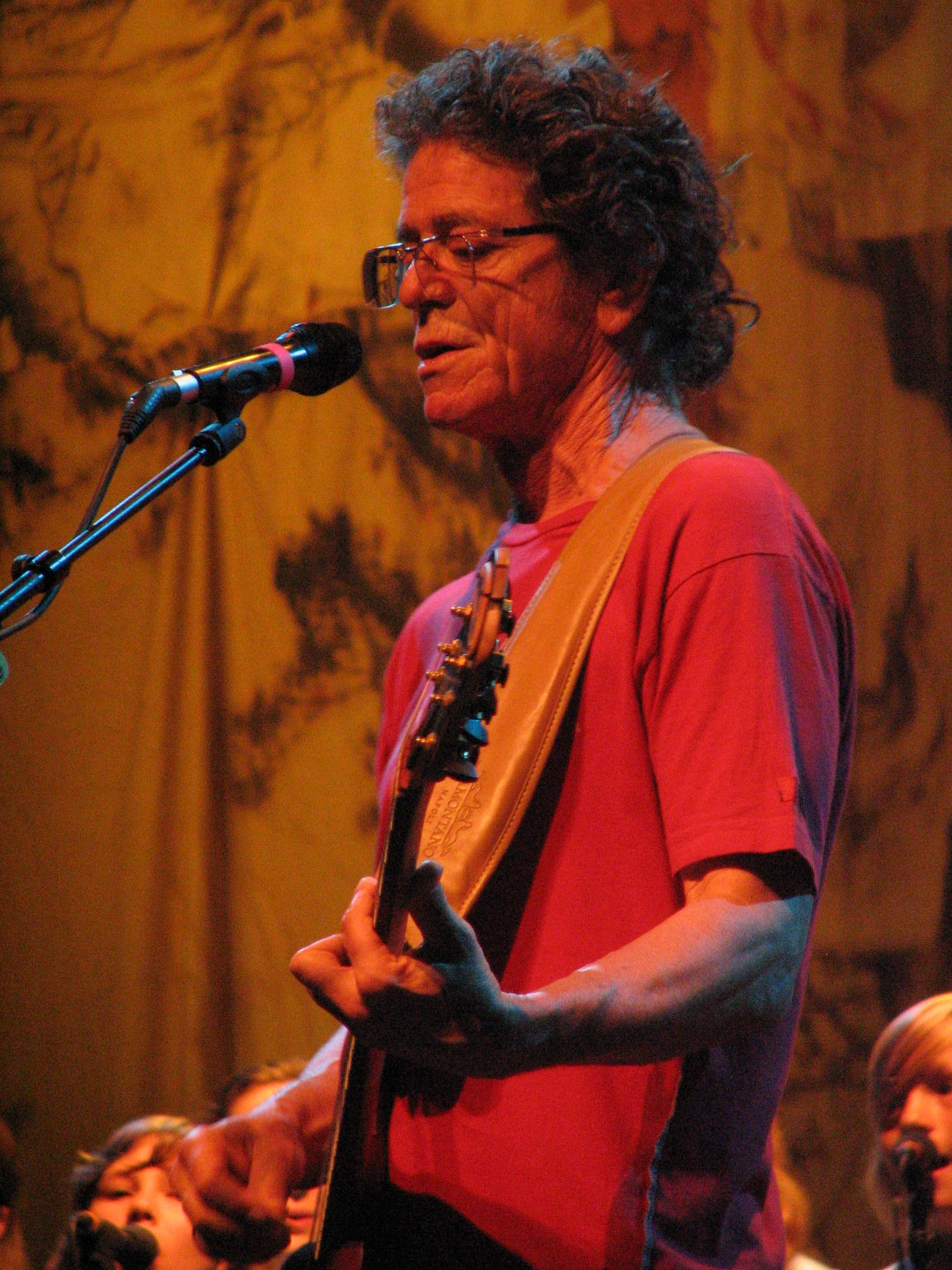
Reed performing in Málaga, Spain, 2008

In 2004, a Groovefinder remix of his song "Satellite of Love", called "Satellite of Love '04", was released. It peaked at No. 10 on the UK Singles Chart.

In October 2006, Reed appeared at Hal Willner's Leonard Cohen tribute show "Came So Far for Beauty" in Dublin, along with Laurie Anderson, Nick Cave, Anohni, Jarvis Cocker, and Beth Orton. He played a heavy metal version of Cohen's "The Stranger Song".

In December of that year, Reed played a series of shows at St. Ann's Warehouse, Brooklyn, based on Berlin. He played with guitarist Steve Hunter, who played on the original album and Rock 'n' Roll Animal, and was joined by singers Anohni and Sharon Jones. The show was produced by Bob Ezrin, who also produced the original album, and Hal Willner. The show played at the Sydney Festival in January 2007 and in Europe during June and July 2007. The album version of the concert, entitled Berlin: Live at St. Ann's Warehouse, and a live film recording of these concerts were both released in 2008. In April 2007, he released Hudson River Wind Meditations, an album of ambient music intended as an aid for meditation, on the Sounds True record label. In June 2007, he performed at the Traffic Festival 2007 in Turin, Italy, a five-day free event organized by the city. In the same month "Pale Blue Eyes" was included in the soundtrack of the French-language film, The Diving Bell and the Butterfly. In August 2007, Reed recorded "Tranquilize" with the Killers in New York City, a duet with Killers frontman Brandon Flowers for the B-side/rarities album Sawdust.

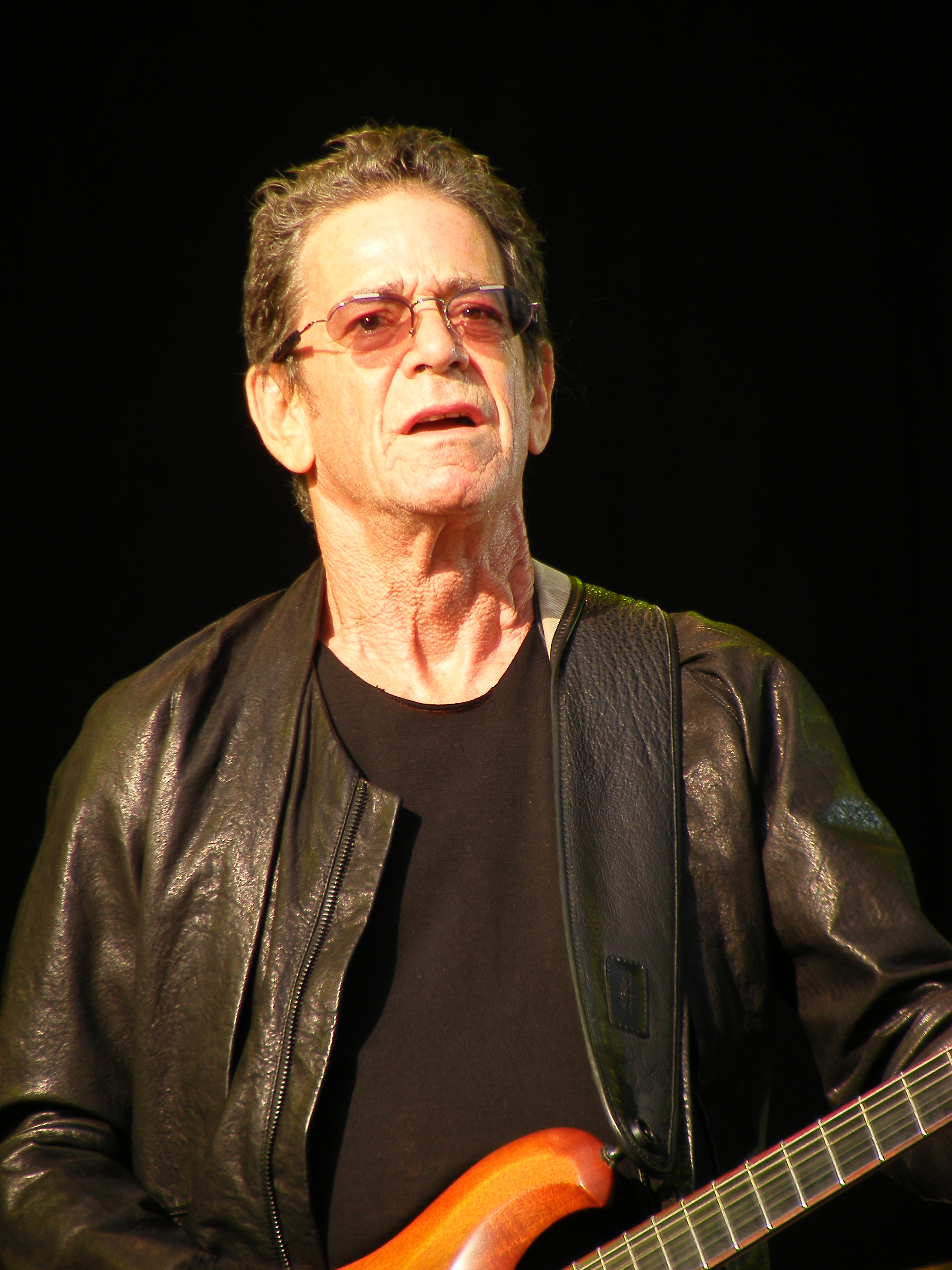
Reed performing at the Hop Farm Festival in Paddock Wood, Kent, 2011

On October 2 and 3, 2008, he introduced his new group, which was later named Metal Machine Trio, at the Walt Disney Concert Hall Complex in Los Angeles. The trio featured Ulrich Krieger (saxophone) and Sarth Calhoun (electronics), and played improvised instrumental music inspired by Metal Machine Music. Recordings of the concerts were released under the title The Creation of the Universe. The trio played at New York's Gramercy Theatre in April 2009, and appeared as part of Reed's band at the 2009 Lollapalooza festival.

Reed provided the voice of Maltazard, the villain in the 2009 Luc Besson animated/live-action feature film Arthur and the Revenge of Maltazard, and appeared as himself in Wim Wenders' 2008 film Palermo Shooting.

Reed played "Sweet Jane" and "White Light/White Heat" with Metallica at Madison Square Garden during the 25th anniversary celebration of the Rock and Roll Hall of Fame on October 30, 2009. In 2010, he was featured on the song "Some Kind of Nature" by Gorillaz, from their third studio album Plastic Beach. In October 2011, Metallica and Reed released Lulu, a concept album based on the Lulu plays by the German playwright Frank Wedekind. The album received mainly negative reviews from music critics and was widely disliked by fans of both artists; Reed joked that he had no fans left after Metal Machine Music. The album debuted at No. 36 on the Billboard 200 with first-week sales of 13,000 copies, and went on to sell 280,000 copies worldwide.

In 2012, Reed collaborated with indie rock band Metric on "The Wanderlust", the tenth track on their fifth studio album Synthetica. This was to be the last original composition he worked on.

== Personal life ==
Reed married Bettye Kronstad in 1973. She later said he had been a violent drunk when on tour. From 1973 to early 1978, Reed was in a relationship with Rachel Humphreys, a trans woman he met at Club 82. Reed married British designer Sylvia Morales in 1980. In 1994, they divorced. From 1992 on, Reed was romantically linked to musician and performance artist Laurie Anderson, and the two worked together on several recordings. They married on April 12, 2008.

Reed said that despite his Jewish background, his "real god was rock 'n' roll". He practiced tai chi during the last part of his life. He also studied meditation with Tibetan Buddhist lama Yongey Mingyur Rinpoche, and described himself as "a student of Buddhist philosophy."

== Death, legacy, and honors ==
Reed had hepatitis and diabetes for several years. He was treated with interferons but developed liver cancer. In May 2013, he underwent a liver transplant at the Cleveland Clinic. Afterward, he wrote on his website of feeling "bigger and stronger" than ever. On October 27, 2013, however, he died from liver disease at his home in East Hampton, New York, at the age of 71. He was cremated and the ashes were given to his family.

His widow, Laurie Anderson, said his last days were peaceful, and described him as a "prince and a fighter". David Byrne, Patti Smith, David Bowie, Morrissey, Miley Cyrus, Iggy Pop, Courtney Love, Lenny Kravitz, and many others also paid tribute to Reed. Former Velvet Underground members Moe Tucker and John Cale made statements on Reed's death, and those from outside the music industry paid their respects such as Cardinal Gianfranco Ravasi.

On October 27, 2013, the day of Reed's death, Pearl Jam dedicated their song "Man of the Hour" to him at their show in Baltimore and then played "I'm Waiting for the Man". On the same day, The Killers dedicated their rendition of "Pale Blue Eyes" to Reed at the Life Is Beautiful festival in Las Vegas. My Morning Jacket performed a cover of "Oh! Sweet Nuthin'" in California, while Arctic Monkeys performed "Walk on the Wild Side" in Liverpool. That same night, Phish opened their show in Hartford, Connecticut, with the Velvet Underground's "Rock & Roll". Lana Del Rey has said that Reed was supposed to record backing vocals on her single, "Brooklyn Baby", on the day of his death. On November 14, 2013, a three-hour public memorial was held near Lincoln Center's Paul Milstein Pool and Terrace. Billed as "New York: Lou Reed at Lincoln Center", the ceremony featured favorite Reed recordings selected by family and friends. On March 14, 2014, Richard Barone and Alejandro Escovedo produced and hosted the first full-scale tribute to Lou Reed at the SXSW Music Festival in Austin, Texas, with over twenty international acts performing Reed's music.

Reed's estate was valued at $30 million, $20 million of which accrued after his death. He left everything to his wife and his sister.

Reed's induction into the Rock and Roll Hall of Fame as a solo artist was announced on December 16, 2014. He was inducted by Patti Smith at a ceremony in Cleveland on April 18, 2015. In 2017, Lou Reed: A Life was published by the Rolling Stone critic Anthony DeCurtis.

Asteroid 270553 Loureed, discovered by Maik Meyer at Palomar Observatory in 2002, was named in his honor. The official naming citation was published by the Minor Planet Center on June 2, 2015 (M.P.C. 94391). A spider discovered in Spain, in 2019, was named Loureedia in his honor. It has a velvet body and lives underground.

An archive of his letters and other personal effects was donated to the New York Public Library for the Performing Arts, where it can be viewed by members of the public. In June 2022, the Library for the Performing Arts at Lincoln Center hosted Lou Reed: Caught Between the Twisted Stars, the first exhibition drawn from Reed's archive.

In 2015, writer Howard Sounes, in the unofficial biography Notes From The Velvet Underground and in interviews, said many of Reed's intimates referred to him as "a prick—[...] that exact word, independently of each other". Sounes described Reed as misogynistic and violent toward women he was in relationships with; as having called Donna Summer a "nigger" and sometimes using that word in conversation "to project a bad boy image"; and as referring to Bob Dylan as "a pretentious kike".

In 2023, Rolling Stone ranked Reed at number 107 on its list of the 200 Greatest Singers of All Time.

In 2023, Laurie Anderson edited The Art of the Straight Line: My Tai Chi. The critically acclaimed book covers Reed's deep love and commitment to tai chi and meditation, as told by Reed and his friends and family.

=== Posthumous release ===
In June 2022, the Lou Reed Archive Series was announced by Light in the Attic Records with Laurie Anderson. The collection has released previously unreleased material with an album called Words & Music, May 1965, along with a reissue of his final solo studio album Hudson River Wind Meditations.

== Artistry ==
Lou Reed is recognized as an art rock legend, a major glam rock pioneer and an experimental rock and roll star. He was also very influential in the development of punk rock and has been called the "Godfather of Punk" on several occasions. Reed also explored other sonorities such as jazz-infused rock, noise music, pop rock, and hard rock.

Reed's songwriting style has been described as "unusually literate" and often contained themes considered to be transgressive. Reed was heavily influenced by literature and poetry, and strived to apply creative autonomy allowed in literature to rock music.

== Equipment ==
=== Guitars ===
Reed's main guitar with the Velvet Underground was a 1964 Gretsch Country Gentleman which he modified extensively, to the extent that it became unplayable. His modifications included the addition of Fender Stratocaster pickups, a built-in tremolo effect taken from a Vox effects pedal, stereo output, and a battery-powered preamplifier. He later played various Fender Telecasters, favoring models that were built specifically for him, such as the Rick Kelly 'Lou Reed's T' Custom Telecaster and a Fender Custom Shop Danny Gatton Telecaster. He also played various other electric guitars throughout his career:

- Carl Thompson
- Steve Klein
- Epiphone Riviera
- Steinberger Synapse Transcale ST-2FPA Custom
- Gibson ES-335TD
- Fender Electric XII twelve-string
- Gibson SG

=== Amplifiers ===
- Jim Kelley Amplifiers
- Fender Deluxe
- Soldano SLO-100
- Tone King Imperial
- Sears Silvertone 1484 Twin-Twelve

== Discography ==
The Velvet Underground

- The Velvet Underground & Nico (1967)
- White Light/White Heat (1968)
- The Velvet Underground (1969)
- Loaded (1970)

Solo

- Lou Reed (1972)
- Transformer (1972)
- Berlin (1973)
- Rock n Roll Animal (1974)
- Sally Can't Dance (1974)
- Lou Reed Live (1975)
- Metal Machine Music (1975)
- Coney Island Baby (1975)
- Rock and Roll Heart (1976)
- Street Hassle (1978)
- The Bells (1979)
- Growing Up in Public (1980)
- The Blue Mask (1982)
- Legendary Hearts (1983)
- New Sensations (1984)
- Mistrial (1986)
- New York (1989)
- Magic and Loss (1992)
- Set the Twilight Reeling (1996)
- Ecstasy (2000)
- The Raven (2003)
- Hudson River Wind Meditations (2007)

Collaborations

- Songs for Drella (1990) (with John Cale)
- Lulu (2011) (with Metallica)

== Tours ==
The Velvet Underground

- NYC Village (Mar 1965-Mar 1966)
- Exploding Plastic Inevitable (Apr 1966-May 1967)
- US Tour (Jun-Dec 1967)
- White Light/White Heat Tour (Feb 1968-Feb 1969)
- The Velvet Underground Tour (Mar 1969-May 1970)
- Unicorn Coffee House Residency (May-Jun 1970)
- Max's Kansas City Residency (Jun-Aug 1970)
- MCMXCIII European Reunion Tour (Jun-Jul 1993)

Solo

- Lou Reed Tour (Jun-Nov 1972)
- Transformer Tour (Dec 1972-Jun 1973)
- Rock n Roll Animal Tour (Sept-Dec 1973)
- Sally Can't Dance Tour (May-Nov 1974)
- 1975 World Tour (Feb-Aug 1975)
- Rock and Roll Heart Tour (Oct 1976-Oct 1977)
- Walk on the Wild Side Tour (Oct-Nov 1977)
- Street Hassle Tour (Mar-Aug 1978)
- The Bells Tour (Mar-Oct 1979)
- Growing Up in Public Tour (May-Jun 1980)
- Legendary Hearts Comeback Tour (Feb-Sept 1983)
- New Sensations Tour (Jun 1984-Jan 1985)
- A Conspiracy of Hope Tour (May-Jul 1986)
- Mistrial Tour (Jul 1986-Jul 1987)
- Songs for Drella Tour (Jan 1989-Aug 1990)
- New York Tour (Mar 1989-Aug 1990)
- Magic and Loss Tour (Jan-Oct 1992)
- 1995 Australian Tour (Apr 1995)
- Set the Twilight Reeling Tour (Mar-Nov 1996)
- Ecstasy Tour (Mar-Nov 2000)
- Lou Reed & Laurie Anderson European Tour (Jun-Jul 2002)
- The Raven Tour (Apr-Sept 2003)
- 2004 Tour (Jul-Oct 2004)
- 2005 Tour (Apr-Aug 2005)
- 2006 Tour (Feb-Nov 2006)
- Berlin Tour (Nov 2006-Jul 2008)
- Lou Reed & Laurie Anderson European Tour (Jul-Sept 2009)
- Metal Machine Music Tour (Oct 2008, Apr 2009, Apr-Nov 2010)
- UK & European Summer Tour (Jul 2011)
- Lou Reed & Metallica Lulu Promo Tour (Nov 2011)
- From VU to Lulu Tour (Jun-Jul 2012)
- European Summer Festivals (Jul-Aug 2012)

== Filmography ==
Year	Title	Role	Notes
1966	The Velvet Underground and Nico: A Symphony of Sound	Himself	
1973	Jimi Hendrix	Himself	
1980	One-Trick Pony	Steve Kunelian	
1983	Get Crazy	Auden	
1983	Rock & Rule	Mok's singing voice	"My Name Is Mok" and "Triumph"; third song "Pain and Suffering" was sung by Iggy Pop
1988	Permanent Record	Himself	
1993	Faraway, So Close!	Himself	
1995	Blue in the Face	Man with Strange Glasses	
1995	Penn & Teller's Smoke and Mirrors	Himself	Unreleased video game; appears as an unbeatable Boss if the player sets the game's difficulty to "Impossible".
1997	Closure	Himself	
1998	Lulu on the Bridge	Not Lou Reed	Cameo
2001	Prozac Nation	Himself	
2008	Berlin: Live at St. Ann's Warehouse	Himself	
2008	Palermo Shooting	Himself	
2009	Arthur and the Revenge of Maltazard	Emperor Maltazard (voice)	Replaced David Bowie, who voiced the character in the first installment.
2010	Arthur 3: The War of the Two Worlds	Emperor Maltazard (voice)	
2010	Red Shirley	Director, Interviewer	Documentary, 28 mins.
2016	Danny Says	Subject	Documentary, 104 mins. Features archival tape from 1975 of Lou Reed listening to the Ramones for the first time with music manager Danny Fields
