= Lucibel Crater =

- Origin: Brooklyn, New York, United States
- Genres: Intelligent dance, live electronic, rock
- Years active: 2005–present
- Labels: Searching Eye Records
- Members: Sarth Calhoun; Leah Coloff; Paul Chuffo
- Website: www.lucibelcrater.com

Lucibel Crater is a band from Brooklyn, New York. Their style is different from song to song but blends live electronic music, alternative rock, and indie rock.

Lucibel Crater recorded their EP Miracles in 2007.

In 2008 they released their first full-length CD, The Family Album. It was mixed by Bryce Goggin. The Family Album refers to and explores the theme of American Life. Coloff's influences on the album include Tom Cora and Cormac McCarthy. Coloff said about the album,

“Through the family theme we intended to talk about the American Life. When we wrote the songs we were permeated with disenchantment and bitterness. The song 'Threadbare Funeral', for example, talks about a woman living alone in the prairie for years who finally looks for someone to rescue her from her abandoned condition. This has been a common “political” thought, lately, as people in the US have felt really abandoned … “Into the Bushes” is a sarcastic glance onto what could happen if we remained anchored to our ideas as Bush did in the past years. We would go on living in ignorance, thinking that the earth is flat. We would not be able to look at our past in order to create a different future. Ideas, that’s the glue, our common ground.”

Lou Reed provides guitar accompaniment on the song Threadbare Funeral. Metal Machine Trio member Ulrich Krieger has performed saxophone with Lucibel Crater during live shows.

== Members ==
- Sarth Calhoun - keys, bass, loops, flukebladder pipe balaxan, sound design, lightsaber, continuum fingerboard
- Leah Coloff - cello, vocals
- Paul Chuffo - drums, thumb piano, sound
- Lou Reed - guitar on "Threadbare Funeral" of The Family Album
