= Clutch of the Tiger =

Studio album by Clutchy Hopkins and Shawn Lee
- Released: October 21, 2008
- Length: 47:54
- Label: Ubiquity Records

Clutch of the Tiger is a collaboration album by musicians Clutchy Hopkins and Shawn Lee. It was released in 2008 on vinyl and CD, both under the Ubiquity Records label.

== Track listing ==
1. "Full Moon" – 3:36
2. "Two Steps Back" – 3:58
3. "Things Change" – 3:26
4. "Bill Blows It" – 5:29
5. "So Easily, So Naturally" – 3:40
6. "Leon Me" – 3:35
7. "Dollar Short" – 4:21
8. "When I Was Young" – 3:52
9. "Across the Pond" – 3:47
10. "Bad Influence" – 3:05
11. "Till Next Time" – 4:32
12. "Indian Burn" – 4:41
