= Mamas Gun =

British contemporary soul band

- Origin: London, England
- Genres: Soul
- Years active: 2008–present
- Labels: Candelion; Colemine; Ubiquity; Love Da Records
- Members: Andy Platts; David Oliver; Terry Lewis; Cameron Dawson; Chris Boot
- Past members: Rex Horan; Jack Pollitt
- Website: mamasgun.co.uk

Mamas Gun is a British contemporary soul band. They found early international success with a radio-friendly soul pop sound. They made 5 full-length albums with evolving personnel, reaching a sound rooted in classic soul with alternative/progressive leanings. Golden Days (2018) marked a major turning point, the band having recorded and produced it themselves.

== History ==
=== Formation ===
The band was formed by Andy 'AP' Platts, the lead singer/composer/producer, in 2007, and was joined by bassist 'Professor' Rex Horan, keyboardist Dave 'Eighties' Oliver, Terry 'Spiller' Lewis and drummer 'Union' Jack Pollitt after placing an ad on Myspace.com seeking musicians. The group name derives from the title of Erykah Badu's second album, Mama's Gun.

In addition to their involvement with Mamas Gun, the band members continue to work in various other capacities ranging from songwriting to studio sessions and touring work. Platts' songwriting collaborators include Rod Temperton, John Oates and former Gil Scott-Heron collaborator, Brian Jackson. He has enjoyed chart success in South East Asia penning number 1 hits for Korean artists Park Hyo Shin, John Park and Japanese singer Tomohisa Yamashita. Since 2015 he has also been an active member of Young Gun Silver Fox alongside Shawn Lee. Terry ‘Spiller’ Lewis has played for US songwriter / artist Leon Ware, Lewis Taylor and The Impressions.

== Music ==
=== UK releases ===
Mamas Gun's first single, "Pots of Gold", was released in August 2008 on Candelion Records and was playlisted on BBC Radio 2. Following its success, Mamas Gun recorded their debut album Routes to Riches, seeing its release in October 2009. The album was co-produced by producer/engineer, Julian Simmons, mixed by producer/engineer Jack Joseph Puig at Ocean Way, Los Angeles and mastered by Bob Ludwig. In June 2011 Mamas Gun released The Life and Soul, produced by Martin Terefe and Andreas Olsson. It yielded the singles "On a String", "Reconnection" and "Only One". In 2014, Cheap Hotel spawned the singles "Red Cassette", "Hello Goodnight" and "Cheap Hotel". The album charted at number 29 on the Independent UK album chart. The band released the Room Service EP via a Pledge exclusive. In 2018, with drummer Chris Boot. They decided to self produce Golden Days mastered by Pierre and Shawn Lee. Singles included "London Girls", "I Need a Win", and "You Make My Life a Better Place". After the release of Golden Days, the band re-recorded the song "This Is the Day".

=== Japan releases ===
Routes to Riches, released in November 2009, achieved a number 3 sales position on the Japanese Billboard charts. The lead single from the album, "House on a Hill", was a number 2 hit on the Japanese Hot 100 singles chart and the most played song on Japanese radio in 2009.

== Discography ==
=== Albums ===
Year	Album details
2009	Routes to Riches: Released: 28 September 2009; Deluxe Edition Released: 1 March 2010; Label: Candelion; Formats: CD, deluxe CD, digital download
2011	The Life and Soul: Released: 6 June 2011; Label: Candelion; Formats: CD, digital download
2014	Cheap Hotel: Released: 23 September 2014; Label: Candelion; Formats: CD, vinyl, digital download
2016	Room Service EP: Released: 16 March 2016; Label: Candelion; Formats: Digital download
2018	Golden Days: Released: 18 May 2018; Label: Candelion; Formats: CD, vinyl, digital download
2022	Cure the Jones: Released: 1 April 2022; Label: Candelion; Légère Recordings; Formats: CD, vinyl, digital download
2026	Dig!: Released: 6 April 2026; Label: Broken Silence; Légère Recordings; Formats: CD, vinyl, digital download

=== International releases ===
Year	Album details
2009	Other Side of Mamas Gun: Released: December 2011, Sail Music; Country: Korea

=== Singles ===
Year	Title	Album
2008	"Pots of Gold"	Routes to Riches
2009	"Let's Find a Way"	Routes to Riches
2009	"You Are the Music"	Routes to Riches
2010	"Finger On It"/ "Wishing"	Routes to Riches
2010	"Finger On It"/ "Wishing"	Routes to Riches: Deluxe Edition
2012	"Only One" (featuring Beverley Knight)	
2012	"Only One" (featuring Beverley Knight)	The Life and Soul
2014	"Red Cassette"	Cheap Hotel
2014	"Hello Goodnight"	Cheap Hotel
2014	"Cheap Hotel"	Cheap Hotel
2018	"London Girls"	Golden Days
2018	"You Make My Life a Better Place"	Golden Days
2018	"On the Wire"	Golden Days

=== Videography ===
- "You Are the Music" (2009)
- "Let's Find a Way" (unofficial video) (2010)
- "Finger On It" (2010)
- "Pots of Gold" (2010)
- "On a String" (2011)
- "Reconnection" (2011)
- "Only One" (live) featuring Beverley Knight (2011)
- "Cheap Hotel" (2014)
- "Joy Rides" (2014)
- "Hello Goodnight" (2014)
- "Cheap Hotel" (2014)
- "London Girls" (2018)
- "I Need a Win" (2018)
- "On the Wire" (2018)
- "Party for One" (2022)
