= Clutchy Hopkins =

- Genres: Downtempo, rare groove
- Occupation: Musician
- Years active: 1970s(?) – present
- Labels: Ubiquity Records, Porter Records, Discos Dead
- Website: myspace.com/whoisclutchyhopkins

Clutchy Hopkins is purportedly a multi-instrumentalist musician based out of California. His existence has not yet been fully verified, though he is widely believed to be a pseudonym for one of several popular DJs. The true identity of the person (or people) behind the music is not publicly known.

== Recent history ==
On September 9, 2006, a YouTube video claiming to be documentary footage about Clutchy Hopkins was uploaded. The video's end credits contain the URL www.misledchildren.com. Originally, this website featured a 12-track album titled The Life of Clutchy Hopkins, plus a white-label store that sold the album, a brief description, and contact information for a seemingly random Hotmail address. The YouTube video's credits also mention a Myspace page which features grainy photos of a ragged-looking bearded man wearing a flannel shirt.

In February 2007, music blog Idolator published a brief post on the music, describing it as "MF Doom-like hip hop instrumentals with India-influenced guitar tracks and some smoother downtempo work that might fool Portishead fans" and speculating that Clutchy might be a pseudonym for DJ Shadow. Additional attention from Okayplayer and KCRW DJ Jeremy Sole sparked discussion among music bloggers who postulated that Cut Chemist, Madlib, Money Mark or Shawn Lee might be responsible for the music. Clutchy's true identity was never discovered, but in early 2008, noted funk label Ubiquity Records released "Walking Backwards", a full-length album of new Clutchy music, featuring guest vocals from Darondo. It was followed by two collaborations with Shawn Lee and the 2009 album Music Is My Medicine, credited to Clutchy Hopkins and Lord Kenjamin. In April 2010, Ubiquity released another solo album titled The Storyteller.

Also in 2008, Porter Records released an album titled Odean Pope and the Misled Children. While the relationship remains unclear, the sound of the Misled Children is very similar to Clutchy Hopkins, and the URL from the YouTube video suggests a connection. Another Misled Children album titled Peoples Market is listed on AllMusic.

In 2011, Clutchy released his first public work as Magnetite, described by Ubiquity Records as a "top secret project from the Clutchy Hopkins camp", on Ubiquity compilation album Save The Music: A Compilation For Record Store Day. Later in 2014, he debuted his first album as Magnetite, entitled Hex on record label Discos Dead.

Noted graphic artist Jim Mahfood has created artwork and album covers for recent Clutchy Hopkins projects.

In 2012, Clutchy Hopkins and future soul artist Erik Rico collaborated on an upcoming music project for the Animated Cartunes label.

== Discography ==
Album	Year	Label
Peoples Market (as Misled Children)	2005	Porter Records
The Life of Clutchy Hopkins	2006	Crate Digler
MF Doom Meets Clutchy Hopkins (promotional EP)	2007	none
Walking Backwards	2008	Ubiquity Records
Odean Pope and the Misled Children (as Misled Children, with Odean Pope)	2008	Porter Records
Clutch of the Tiger (with Shawn Lee)	2008	Ubiquity Records
Music Is My Medicine (with Lord Kenjamin)	2009	Ubiquity Records
Fascinating Fingers (with Shawn Lee)	2009	Ubiquity Records
The Story Teller	2010	Ubiquity Records
The Life of Eugene Harrington (as Eugene Harrington)	2010	NOECHO
Don't Close The Door (Single) (as Magnetite)	2011	Ubiquity Records
high desert low tide (with Fat Albert Einstein)	2017	Crate Digler
ICEBOX (with The Red Spiders/JVISION/E.SC)	2017	SwampCoolin
