= Metal Machine Music =

1975 studio album by Lou Reed

Studio album by Lou Reed
- Released: July 1975
- Genres: Noise; drone
- Length: 64:11
- Label: RCA Victor
- Producer: Lou Reed

Lou Reed chronology
Lou Reed Live (1975)	Metal Machine Music (1975)	Coney Island Baby (1975)
- Audio on YouTube

Metal Machine Music (subtitled *The Amine β Ring) is the fifth solo album by the American rock musician Lou Reed. It was released as a double album in July 1975 by RCA Records, but taken off the market three weeks later. A radical departure from the rest of his catalog, Metal Machine Music features no songs or recognizably structured compositions, eschewing melody and rhythm for layers of feedback and distortion at various speeds. A supposedly "quadraphonic" version of the album was said by Reed to be produced by playing two copies simultaneously on two different record players.

While the album sold 100,000 copies on release, it quickly became the most returned album in RCA's history, leading them to pull the record from distribution. The album cost Reed his reputation in the music industry and was universally panned by critics. Simultaneously, it opened the door for some of his later, more experimental material, and is often considered a progenitor of modern noise and industrial music. In 2008, Reed, Ulrich Krieger, and Sarth Calhoun collaborated to tour playing free improvisation inspired by the album as Metal Machine Trio. In 2011, Reed released a remastered version of Metal Machine Music.

== Style ==
A major influence on Reed's recording, for which he tuned all the guitar strings to the same note, was the mid-1960s drone music of La Monte Young's Theatre of Eternal Music, whose members included John Cale, Tony Conrad, Angus MacLise, and Marian Zazeela. Both Cale and MacLise were also members of Reed's band the Velvet Underground, though MacLise left before the group began recording. The Theatre of Eternal Music's just intonation harmonies, sustained notes, and loud amplification influenced Cale's subsequent contributions to the Velvet Underground.

In a contemporary interview with rock journalist Lester Bangs, Reed stated that he "had also been listening to Xenakis a lot." He claimed that he had intentionally placed sonic allusions to classical works such as Ludwig van Beethoven's Symphony No. 3 and Symphony No. 6 in the album, and that he had attempted to have it released on the RCA Red Seal classical label. He repeated the latter claim in a 2007 interview.

Metal Machine Music was mastered by Bob Ludwig.

== Critical reception ==
Professional ratings
Review scores
Source	Rating
AllMusic	1/5 stars
Chicago Tribune	1/4 stars
Christgau's Record Guide	C+
Classic Rock	5/10
Disc	3/4 stars
MusicHound Rock	woof!
Pitchfork	8.7/10
Record Collector	1/5 stars
The Rolling Stone Album Guide	1/5 stars
Tom Hull – on the Web	C

=== Contemporary reviews ===
Metal Machine Music confounded critics and listeners, with the original LP being withdrawn within three weeks of its release. The Stranger's Dave Segal later claimed it was one of the most divisive records ever released, challenging both critics and the artist's core audience; he compared this to the reception of Miles Davis' live album Agharta, released the same year.

Lester Bangs wrote of the album that "as classical music it adds nothing to a genre that may well be depleted. As rock 'n' roll it's interesting garage electronic rock 'n' roll. As a statement it's great, as a giant FUCK YOU [sic] it shows integrity—a sick, twisted, dunced-out, malevolent, perverted, psychopathic integrity, but integrity nevertheless." Bangs later wrote a tongue-in-cheek article in which he judged it "the greatest record ever made in the history of the human eardrum". The Village Voice critic Robert Christgau considered it Reed's "answer to Environments", saying it had "certainly raised consciousness in both the journalistic and business communities" and was not "totally unlistenable", though he admitted for white noise he would rather listen to the Velvet Underground's "Sister Ray".

In Rolling Stone, James Wolcott likened the album to "the tubular groaning of a galactic refrigerator" and considered it as displeasing to experience as "a night in a bus terminal". In the 1979 Rolling Stone Record Guide, critic Billy Altman called it "a two-disc set consisting of nothing more than ear-wrecking electronic sludge, guaranteed to clear any room of humans in record time".

Despite the intense criticism, or perhaps because of the exposure it generated, Metal Machine Music reportedly sold 100,000 copies in the US, according to the liner notes of the 2000 CD reissue by RCA/Buddah Records.

The first issue of the pioneering punk zine Punk featured Reed on the cover and claimed that the album had presaged punk rock.

=== Retrospective assessment ===
Reed biographer Victor Bockris wrote that Metal Machine Music could be understood as "the ultimate conceptual punk album and the progenitor of New York punk rock". The album was ranked number two in the 1991 book The Worst Rock 'n' Roll Records of All Time by Jimmy Guterman and Owen O'Donnell. Writing in MusicHound Rock (1999), Greg Kot opined: "The spin cycle of a washing machine has more melodic variation than the electronic drone that was Metal Machine Music."

In 1998, The Wire included Metal Machine Music in its list of "100 Records That Set the World on Fire (While No One Was Listening)", with Brian Duguid writing:

Q magazine featured Metal Machine Music in its 50 Worst Records of All Time ... What higher recommendation could you possibly need? ... [Metal Machine Music] is at once the pre-eminent deranged noise record, an impossibly cacophonous screech of electric torment, and also a classic of Minimalism; some of the most enigmatic, exquisite harmonies ever documented. It's a pity the CD reissues can't include the original double LP's locked groove, but even if it doesn't last forever, the music is infinitely convoluted. It still awaits a proper critical reappraisal—even the gleefully enthusiastic Lester Bangs didn't fully 'get' Metal Machine Music.

In 2005, Q magazine included the album in a list of "Ten Terrible Records by Great Artists", and it ranked number four in Q's list of the 50 worst albums of all time. It was again featured in Q in December 2010, on the magazine's "Top Ten Career Suicides" list, where it came eighth overall. The Trouser Press Record Guide referred to it as "four sides of unlistenable oscillator noise". Mark Deming of AllMusic wrote that, while subsequent noise rock groups had "created some sort of context for it", Metal Machine Music "hasn't gotten any more user friendly with time" due to its lack of "rhythms, melodies, or formal structures to buffer the onslaught".

In 2011, Reed sardonically reflected on the negative public response to Lulu, his collaborative album with Metallica: "I don't have any fans left. After Metal Machine Music, they all fled. Who cares?"

In a 2017 retrospective review, Mark Richardson of Pitchfork gave Metal Machine Music a score of 8.7 out of 10, describing it as "the sound of electricity falling in love with itself, utterly relentless, a blast of energy that never lets up".

== Performance ==
Lou Reed did not perform Metal Machine Music live until March 2002, when he collaborated with the avant-garde classical ensemble Zeitkratzer at the MaerzMusik festival in Berlin to perform it in a new arrangement by composer Ulrich Krieger featuring strings, winds, piano, and accordion. Live recordings with (2007) and without (2014) Reed are available commercially.

In 2008, Reed formed the Metal Machine Trio with Krieger and Sarth Calhoun to explore similar sonic territory through free improvisation.

== Track listing ==
All music is composed by Lou Reed. Each track corresponds to an entire side on the LP.

No.	Title	Length
1.	"Metal Machine Music A-1"	16:10
2.	"Metal Machine Music A-2"	15:53
3.	"Metal Machine Music A-3"	16:13
4.	"Metal Machine Music A-4"	15:55

On the original LP release, timings for sides 1–3 were stated as "16:01"; the fourth side, which featured a locked groove, was listed as "16:01 or ∞". On CD, this locked groove is imitated for 2:22 before a fadeout.

On later CD, DVD, and Blu-Ray reissues of the album, the tracks are retitled "Part 1", "Part 2", "Part 3", and "Part 4."

== See also ==
- Arc, a Neil Young and Crazy Horse live album featuring an edited composition consisting largely of feedback

== Sources ==
- Bangs, Lester (1987). "How to Succeed in Torture Without Really Trying". In Greil Marcus (ed.). Psychotic Reactions and Carburetor Dung. New York: Alfred A. Knopf. ISBN 0-394-53896-X.
- Fricke, David (2000). Liner notes. Metal Machine Music by Lou Reed, 1975. Buddah Records 74465 99752 2 (reissue).
- Guterman, Jimmy and Owen O'Donnell (1991). The Worst Rock 'n' Roll Records of All Time. New York: Citadel Press.
- Eno, Brian (1996). A Year with Swollen Appendices. London: Faber and Faber. ISBN 0-571-17995-9.
