= Fascinating Fingers =

Studio album by Clutchy Hopkins and Shawn Lee
- Released: October 13, 2009
- Genre: Electronic, funk, jazz
- Length: 45:54
- Label: Ubiquity Records

Professional ratings
Review scores
Source	Rating
AllMusic	4/5 stars

Fascinating Fingers is a collaboration album by musicians Clutchy Hopkins and Shawn Lee. It was released in 2009 on vinyl and CD, both under the Ubiquity Records label.

== Track listing ==
1. "70 MPH Isn't Fast Enough to Get Out of Nebraska" – 4:00
2. "7 Inch" – 3:03
3. "Mimi Tatonka" – 3:36
4. "Root Trees" – 3:54
5. "Cross Rhodes" – 3:16
6. "Chapter 2" – 3:22
7. "Ancient Chinese Secret" – 3:58
8. "Fish Sauce" – 4:04
9. "Name Game" – 4:46
10. "Bootie Beat" – 4:02
11. "Willie Groovemaker" – 4:41
12. "What More Can I Say (Top Chillin')" – 3:24
