= Tony Diodore =

- Origin: Brooklyn, New York, United States
- Genres: Rock; alternative; electronic; experimental
- Occupation: Musician
- Instruments: Guitar; violin
- Years active: 1999-present
- Labels: Searching Eye Records; Ubiquity

Tony Diodore is a musician from Brooklyn, NY. He played guitar and violin in Lou Reed's live tour band, and formerly played guitar and/or violin in multiple Brooklyn trip hop and electronic bands, including: Number19, BM Linx, and Puracane.

== Biography ==
Tony Diodore grew up in Marion, Indiana where he studied violin with Patricia Tretick. After moving to New York City he began playing in the band Number19 in 1999 with electronic musician Sarth Calhoun, drummer Marcus Righter, and vocalist/cellist Leah Coloff. The band performed online as well as in person, and funded its first album, Suspension, from mp3.com downloads.

Also in 2005 Tony formed the electronic, psychedelic rock band BM Linx with Jonathan Murray and drummer Andrew Griffith. The band released its EP, The Portable Genius in 2006, and full-length album Black Entertainment in 2008. The band toured the U.S., Canada, and Europe, but have been on hiatus since 2010, and their third record remains unfinished.

In 2006 Tony played guitar and violin with Puracane for their album, I've Been Here the Longest, released by Astraea Records.

Since 2011 he has been touring and playing guitar in Lou Reed's live band.
