= Ved Første Øjekast =

Studio album by Mike Sheridan
- Released: April 16, 2012
- Genre: Downtempo, Tech House, Ambient
- Length: 48:29
- Label: Playground Music Scandinavia
- Producer: Mike Sheridan

Mike Sheridan chronology
I Syv Sind (2008)	Ved Første Øjekast (2012)

Professional ratings
Review scores
Source	Rating
Gaffa	5/6 stars

Ved Første Øjekast is the second studio album by Danish electronic musician Mike Sheridan, released in April 2012 through Playground Music Scandinavia. The album features vocals by Rasmus Walter, Freja Loeb and Dahl Kammerkor.

== Track listing ==
No.	Title	Length
1.	"Tankesløjfe"	7:52
2.	"Et Nyt Sted"	2:51
3.	"Udsigt" (vocals by Rasmus Walter)	4:19
4.	"Ved Første Øjekast"	4:51
5.	"Håblyst" (vocals by Freja Loeb)	5:13
6.	"Fastklemt"	9:20
7.	"Brokvarteret"	5:34
8.	"September Luft" (vocals by Dahl Kammerkor)	8:29
Total length:		48:29
