= Bryce Goggin =

American record producer and sound engineer

Bryce Goggin is an American record producer and sound engineer. His career began in the early 1990s, working at Baby Monster Studios. He first received note for mixing the album Crooked Rain, Crooked Rain by Pavement. He has since worked with a number of musicians including The Apples in Stereo, Luna, Swans, Evan Dando, Sean Lennon, Sebadoh, Come, Spacehog, Ramones, The Morning Glories, Band of Susans, Grand Avenue, Phish, Akron Family, The Spring Standards, Lucibel Crater, Skeleton Key, Bettie Serveert, Silent Partner (artist), and Antony and the Johnsons.

In 2013, he mixed "This Tree" by Leah Coloff, one of the first releases in interactive Gralbum format. He won an Independent Music Award, along with Kenny Siegal and Brian Geltner, for Best Music Producer for Johnny Society's Free Society.
