= New Territories (album) =

Studio album by Eric Lau
- Released: March 18, 2008
- Genre: R&B, Soul
- Length: 40:58
- Label: Ubiquity Records
- Producer: Eric Lau

Eric Lau chronology
New Territories (2008)	''One of Many'' (2013)

Professional ratings
Review scores
Source	Rating
allmusic.com	4/5 stars
popmatters.com	3.5/5 stars

New Territories is the debut album by London-based music producer Eric Lau.

The album was released to critical acclaim, with Straight No Chaser claiming "New Territories represents the arrival of a talented artist and perceptive one-man production house."

== Track listing ==
No.	Title	Writer(s)	Producer(s)	Length
1.	"Welcome"		Eric Lau	1:09
2.	"I Don't Do It To" (featuring Tawiah)	Eric Lau, Beverly Tawiah, Jodi Milliner	Eric Lau, Jodi Milliner	3:25
3.	"Right Side" (featuring Sarina Leah)	Lau, Sarina Mantle	Eric Lau	2:31
4.	"Confession Lounge" (featuring Rahel)	Lau, Rahel Debebe-Dessalegne	Eric Lau	2:37
5.	"Final Chance" (featuring Meshach Brown & Rahel)	Lau, Debebe-Dessalegne, Jack Prideaux, Meshach Spooner	Eric Lau, Layla Rutherford	3:05
6.	"Time Will Tell" (featuring Sariah Leah)	Lau, Mantle	Eric Lau	3:54
7.	"Don't Let Them" (featuring Tosin)	Lau, Tosin Owolabi	Eric Lau	3:30
8.	"Free It Out" (featuring Sarina Leah)	Lau, Mantle	Eric Lau	2:51
9.	"Show Me" (featuring Rahel)	Lau, Debebe-Dessalegne	Eric Lau, Layla Rutherford	3:20
10.	"Let It Go" (featuring Rahel)	Lau, Debebe-Dessalegne	Eric Lau	3:33
11.	"Begin" (featuring Annabel, Rahel & Sarina Leah)	Lau, Annabel Annan-Jonathan, Mantle, Debebe-Dessalegne	Eric Lau	3:07
12.	"How Far" (featuring Rahel)	Lau, Debebe-Dessalegne	Eric Lau	2:39
13.	"Hope" (featuring Meshach Brown)	Lau, Spooner	Eric Lau	3:38
14.	"Outro"		Eric Lau	1:41

== Personnel ==
- Alex Reeve - Guitar
- Annabel Annan-Jonathan - Vocals
- Eric Lau – Production, Mixing
- Finn Peters – Flute
- Jodi Milliner – Bass Guitar, Rhodes
- Julian Ferraretto – Violin
- Layla Rutherford - Background Vocals, Claps, Finger Snaps
- Meshach Brown - Vocals
- Rahel – Vocals
- Sarina Leah - Vocals
- Tawiah - Vocals
- Tosin – Rhodes, Vocals
