= Carla Scaletti =

American composer (born 1956)

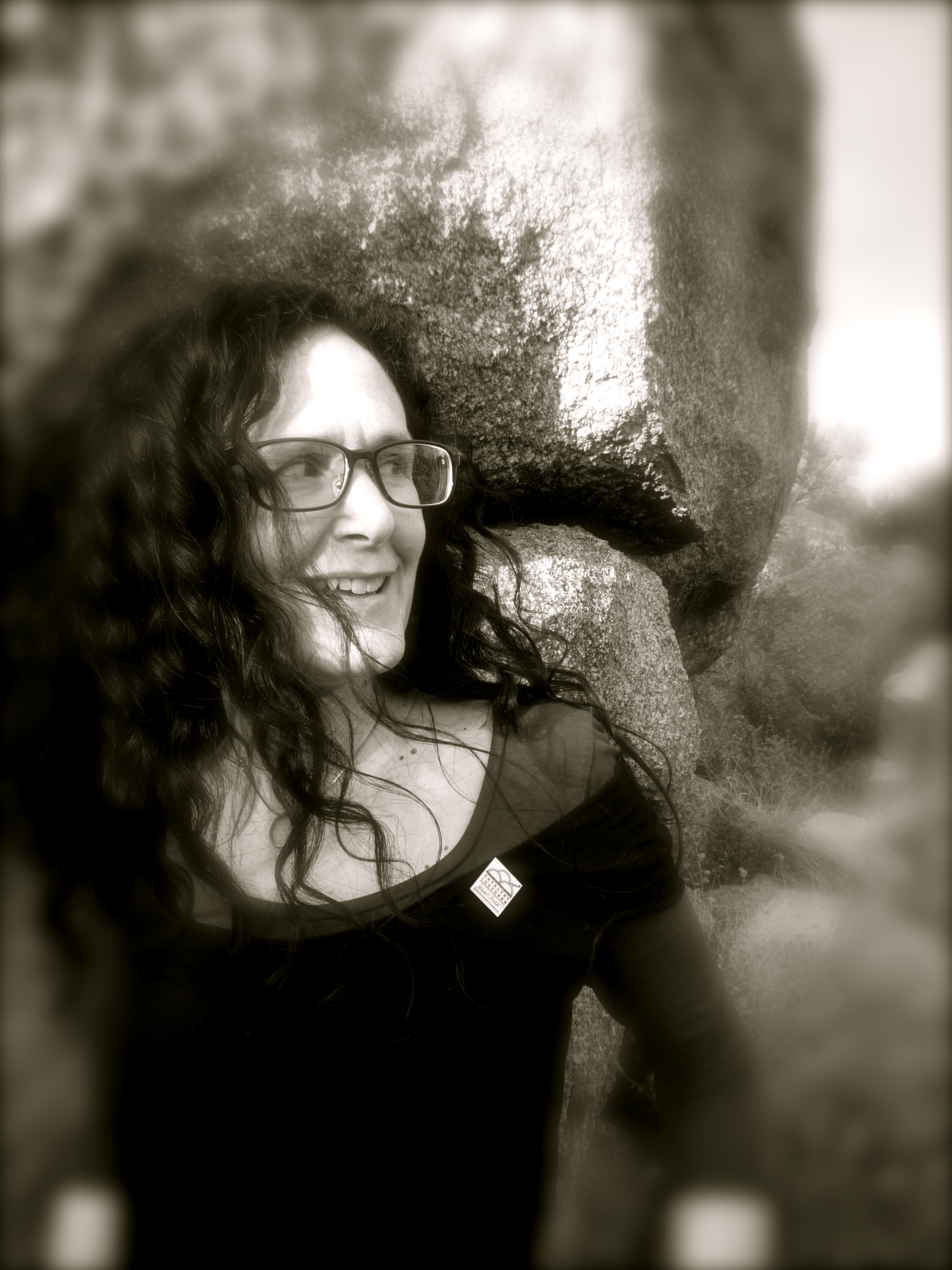
- Scaletti in Albuquerque, 2011
- Born: April 28, 1956 (age 70); Ithaca, New York
- Education: University of Illinois Urbana-Champaign
- Known for: Kyma (sound design language), Data Sonification
- Scientific career
- Fields: Computer music, Data Sonification, audio engineering
- Workplaces: Symbolic Sound Corporation
- Website: carlascaletti.com

Carla Scaletti (born April 28, 1956) is an American composer, harpist, music technologist and the inventor of the Kyma (sound design language) and co-founder of Symbolic Sound Corporation.

== Biography ==
Carla Scaletti was born in Ithaca, New York. Raised by entrepreneurial educators, her early fascination with science was heavily influenced by her microbiologist father. She relocated to Albuquerque, New Mexico in 1964. Scaletti completed a Bachelor of Music from the University of New Mexico, a Master of Music from Texas Tech University, and both a Master of Computer Science and a Doctor of Musical Arts in music composition from the University of Illinois Urbana-Champaign (UIUC). In the 1970s, she worked as the principal harpist in the New Mexico Symphony Orchestra and the Lubbock Symphony Orchestra, and composed for acoustic instruments before shifting her focus toward computer-generated music.

Scaletti served as a visiting assistant professor of music at UIUC before working as a researcher at the CERL Sound Group. In 1986, she outlined the initial design for Kyma in a paper titled "Kyma: A Computer Language for the Representation of Music". In 1989, Scaletti co-founded the Symbolic Sound Corporation with Kurt J. Hebel as a spinoff of the CERL Sound Group to commercialize her Kyma sound generation computer language. From 2000 to 2007, she lectured at the Center for the Creation of Music Iannis Xenakis (CCMIX) in Paris.

Carla Scaletti on natural sounds and mathematics
Scaletti discusses her compositional philosophy (1999).

Scaletti refers to her compositions as "mu-psi" (music and science fiction), actively differentiating between data sonification for scientific research and data-driven music. She specializes in "Auditory Analytics," using sonification for scientific exploration. In 2024 and 2026, she co-authored papers in the Proceedings of the National Academy of Sciences applying sonification to protein folding dynamics and hydrogen bonds.

Scaletti has published professional articles in the Proceedings of the National Academy of Sciences (PNAS), the Journal of Chemometrics, the Computer Music Journal, Perspectives of New Music, and the proceedings of the OOPSLA and SPIE conferences, as well as several book chapters. In 2006, she was interviewed by Tara Rodgers for her work at the intersection of music and science. She has delivered keynotes at the International Computer Music Conference (2015), the International Conference on Auditory Display (2017), and the Audio Developer Conference (2024). Among her honors, Scaletti received the Distinguished Alumnae Award for contributions in the field of music from Texas Tech University (2003), the SEAMUS Award (2017), the WIFTS Sound Award (2017), and a Sonification Award in data analysis (2025).

== Works ==
Scaletti composes computer-generated music. Selected works include:

Year	Title	Description
1977	Motet	For mezzo-soprano, narrator, harp, and bass clarinet.
1981	Yes	For mezzo-soprano and electronic sound.
1982	Blood Wedding	Incidental music for Garcia Lorca's play.
1983	Lysogeny	For harp and computer-generated sound, exploring genetic and musical mutation using a model of a lysogenic virus.
1986	X bar	For piano and live electronics.
1986	Levulose	For bass and computer-generated sound.
1987	sunSurgeAutomata	Computer-generated sound piece exploring a Cellular Automata algorithm.
1989	Trinity	For voice and interactive electronics, representing her first composition using the Kyma system.
1994	Mitochondria	Computer-generated sound.
1995	Public Organ	Interactive electronics.
1999	Lament	For voice and interactive electronics.
1999	Tangled Timelines	For harp and interactive electronics.
2002	Frog Pool Farm	Live Kyma system piece utilizing field recordings of a frog chorus.
2008	SlipStick	For Continuum fingerboard controlling interactive electronics.
2008	Cyclonic	Live synthesis piece emulating a storm using a soundscape of field recordings and synthesized sounds.
2010	Autocatalysis	Audience participation piece modeling a dynamical Brusselator system.
2011	Spider Galaxies	Contemporary dance piece by Gilles Jobin, co-composed with Cristian Vogel.
2011	...odd kind of sympathy	For audience processed through Kyma.
2013	QUANTUM	Data-driven music soundtrack for Gilles Jobin's choreography, based on ATLAS experiment data from the Large Hadron Collider.
2014	Conductus	For organ, three singers, and Kyma, exploring the diffusion of sound and modeling a gene transcription regulation network.
2016	Double-well	Audience-interactive piece modeling a dynamical double-well potential inspired by the Higgs Boson.
2017	Bubble & Squeak	For performer processed through Kyma.
2017	h—>gg	A QUANTUM suite exploring knowledge acquired through inference rather than direct observation.
2017	The Strip of Möbius	Live improvisation with Rich O'Donnell and Anna Lum.
2017	VR_I	3D music and sound design for Gilles Jobin's virtual reality dance piece.
2018	Wí Shpá, A journey in bare feet	Data-driven score for choreographer Minerva Muñoz.
2019	Rupture	For Kyma and iPad, mapping 3D seismological data from the El Mayor-Cucapah earthquake.
2023	misfold	For organ and live Kyma electronics, inspired by scientific concepts related to proteins.

Kyma language has been used to prepare the soundtracks of films including:

- War of the Worlds
- Star Wars: Episode III – Revenge of the Sith
- Finding Nemo
- Star Wars: Episode II – Attack of the Clones
- WALL-E
- The Dark Knight
- Master and Commander

Kyma language has been used to prepare the soundtracks of video games including:

- World of Warcraft
- Mirror's Edge
- Dark Messiah
- Quake II
- Mage Knight
