= Young Gun Silver Fox =

London-based soft rock duo

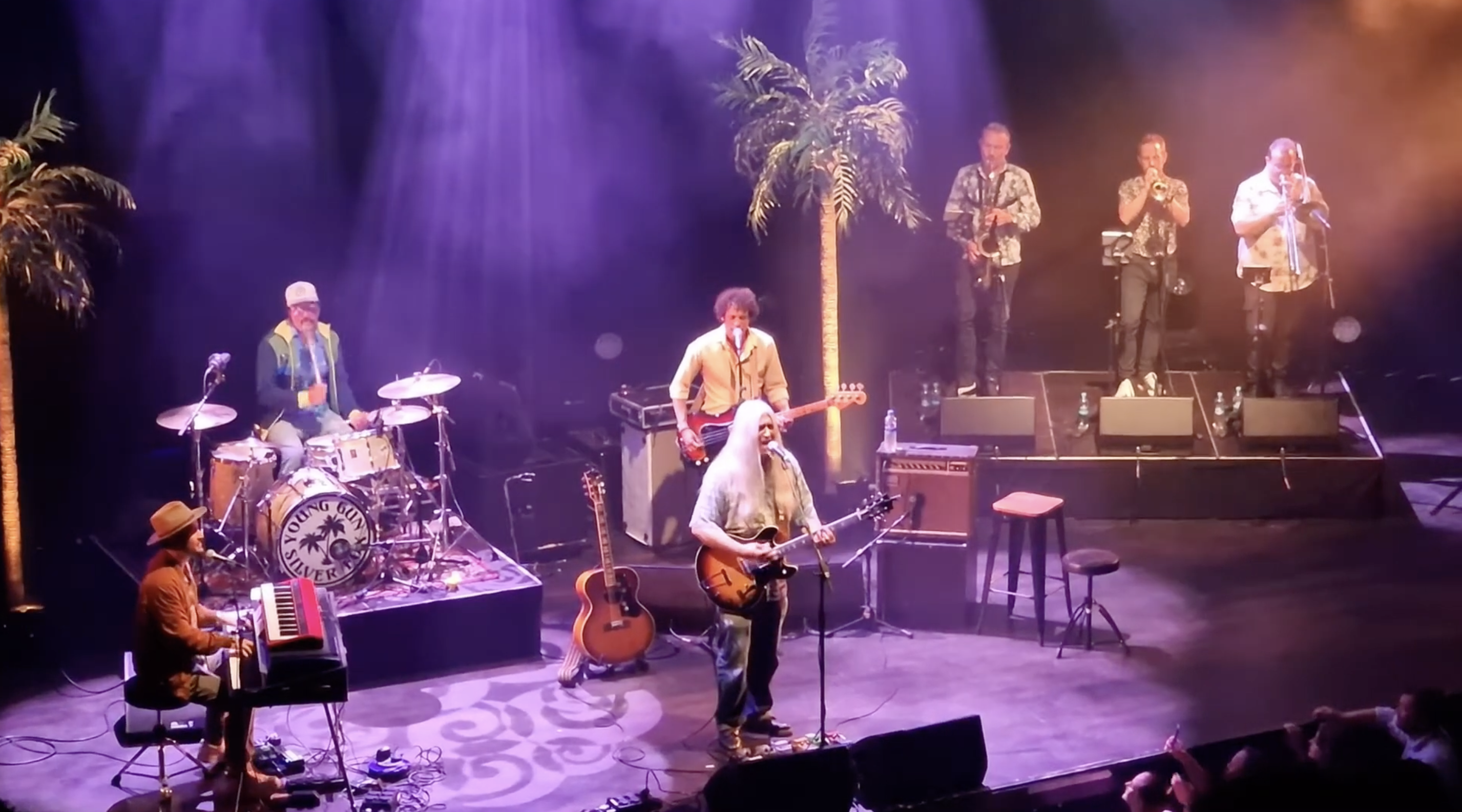
- Young Gun Silver Fox performing at TivoliVredenburg in Utrecht, Netherlands, 2022

Background information
- Origin: London, England
- Genres: Soft rock; jazz rock
- Years active: 2012–present
- Labels: Wax Poetics; Candelion; Légère
- Members: Andy Platts; Shawn Lee
- Website: younggunsilverfox.com

Young Gun Silver Fox is a London-based soft rock duo formed in 2012, consisting of British singer-songwriter Andy Platts and American multi-instrumentalist Shawn Lee. Their former record label Wax Poetics described their music as a "modern re-imagining of the classic West Coast AOR studio sound of the mid- to late '70s."

== History ==
Andy Platts and Shawn Lee first met on Myspace in 2005, when they heard each other's music and immediately knew they wanted to work together. Both members had established musical careers, with Platts fronting the British soul-pop band Mamas Gun, and Lee having released dozens of albums with his Ping Pong Orchestra or under his own name, including the soundtrack for the video game Bully.

The two musicians came together in London in 2012, with the name "Young Gun Silver Fox", referring to Platts as the "Young Gun" and Lee as the "Silver Fox." They released their first single, "You Can Feel It," in 2015. They soon released their 2015 debut studio album West End Coast, whose name refers to the duo's studio in the West End of London combined with their influences from the West Coast of the United States.

In 2018, the duo released their second studio album AM Waves to critical acclaim, with Glide Magazine calling it "the best yacht rock LP of the last 35 years." Pitchfork praised the album's track "Lenny" in particular: "The track is gauzy and warm, with Platts’ sweeping melody and a breezy vibraphone line set against a blues-pop guitar lick so smooth you can see John Mayer’s face contorting in ecstasy every time you hear it."

They released their third album Canyons in 2020, which prominently featured a horn section in addition to the rest of the vocals and instruments performed by the duo. Their fourth album Ticket to Shangri-La was released on Candelion Records in 2022 and received further praise from music critics.

== Style ==
Young Gun Silver Fox is frequently described as a soft rock band, with heavy influences from 1970s pop, soul, soft rock, and AOR. Their music is characterized by funk-driven grooves, crisp horn sections, and Platts' falsetto vocals. Musical influences cited by the band include Shuggie Otis, Jimi Hendrix, Ennio Morricone, The Beatles, James Brown, Jeff Porcaro, Steely Dan, Carol Kaye, Alan Parsons, and Mike Finnigan.

== Discography ==
=== Studio albums ===
- West End Coast (2015)
- AM Waves (2018)
- Canyons (2020)
- Ticket to Shangri-La (2022)
- Pleasure (2025)

=== Live albums ===
- Live from the Troubadour & Paradiso (2026)
