= BM Linx =

- Origin: Brooklyn, New York, United States
- Genre: trip hop
- Years active: 2005–2010
- Labels: FB, Crazy Factory Entertainment
- Members: Tony Diodore; Jonathan Murray; Andrew Griffith
- Website: www.bmlinx.com

BM Linx was a psychedelic rock group formed in 2005 by Tony Diodore (guitar & violin) with Jonathan Murray (bass), and Andrew Griffith (drums). The origin of the name stems from a friend of Diodore's, who owned a Mercury Lynx, but put a BMW badge on the front and called it a BM Linx.

The band released its EP, The Portable Genius in 2006, and full-length album Black Entertainment in 2008. The band toured the U.S., Canada, and Europe, performing at many festivals, but have been on hiatus since 2010, and their third record remains unfinished.
