= I Syv Sind =

Studio album by Mike Sheridan
- Released: September 8, 2008
- Genre: Dub techno, Ambient, Downtempo
- Length: 60:45
- Label: Playground Music
- Producer: Mike Sheridan

Mike Sheridan chronology
I Syv Sind (2008)	Ved Første Øjekast (2012)

Professional ratings
Review scores
Source	Rating
Gaffa	5/6 stars
Soundvenue	4/6 stars

I Syv Sind is the debut album by Danish electronic musician Mike Sheridan, released in September 2008 under the record label Playground Music Scandinavia. The album features vocals by Frida Hilarius and Maya Albana. The cover photograph was taken in Reykjanes.

In 2013, Neill Blomkamp's film Elysium featured the track 'Stjernekiggeri'.

== Track listing ==
No.	Title	Length
1.	"Natteravn"	5:40
2.	"Tidligt Afsted"	4:22
3.	"Morgentimer"	4:44
4.	"Stilhed" (vocals by Frida Hilarius Brygmann)	7:13
5.	"Stjernekiggeri"	2:53
6.	"Dine Grønne Øjne"	10:14
7.	"I Syv Sind"	6:55
8.	"Søvnløse Nætter"	2:36
9.	"Med Små Skridt" (vocals by Maya Albana)	4:09
10.	"Som Regn Fra En Skyfri Himmel"	3:13
11.	"For Tæt På"	8:28
Total length:		60:45
