= Number19 =

Band from Brooklyn, New York

- Origin: Brooklyn, New York, United States
- Genres: electronica
- Years active: 1999–2005
- Labels: Searching Eye Records
- Past members: Sarth Calhoun; Leah Coloff; Tony Diodore; Marcus Righter
- Website: www.number19.com/band.html

Number19 was a band from Brooklyn, New York. It was formed in 1999 by Sarth Calhoun (bass, Yamaha EX5), Leah Coloff (voice, cello), Tony Diodore (guitar, violin), and Marcus Righter (drums). The band experimented with electronic sounds in alternative and indie rock settings, focusing on cello and violin swooping over grooving bass and drums. The band notably funded its first album, Suspension, from mp3.com downloads. At one point the band was ranked #18 overall on the site, and garnered over 90,000 downloads in 6 months.
