= Grégoire Blanc =

French classical musician (born 1996)

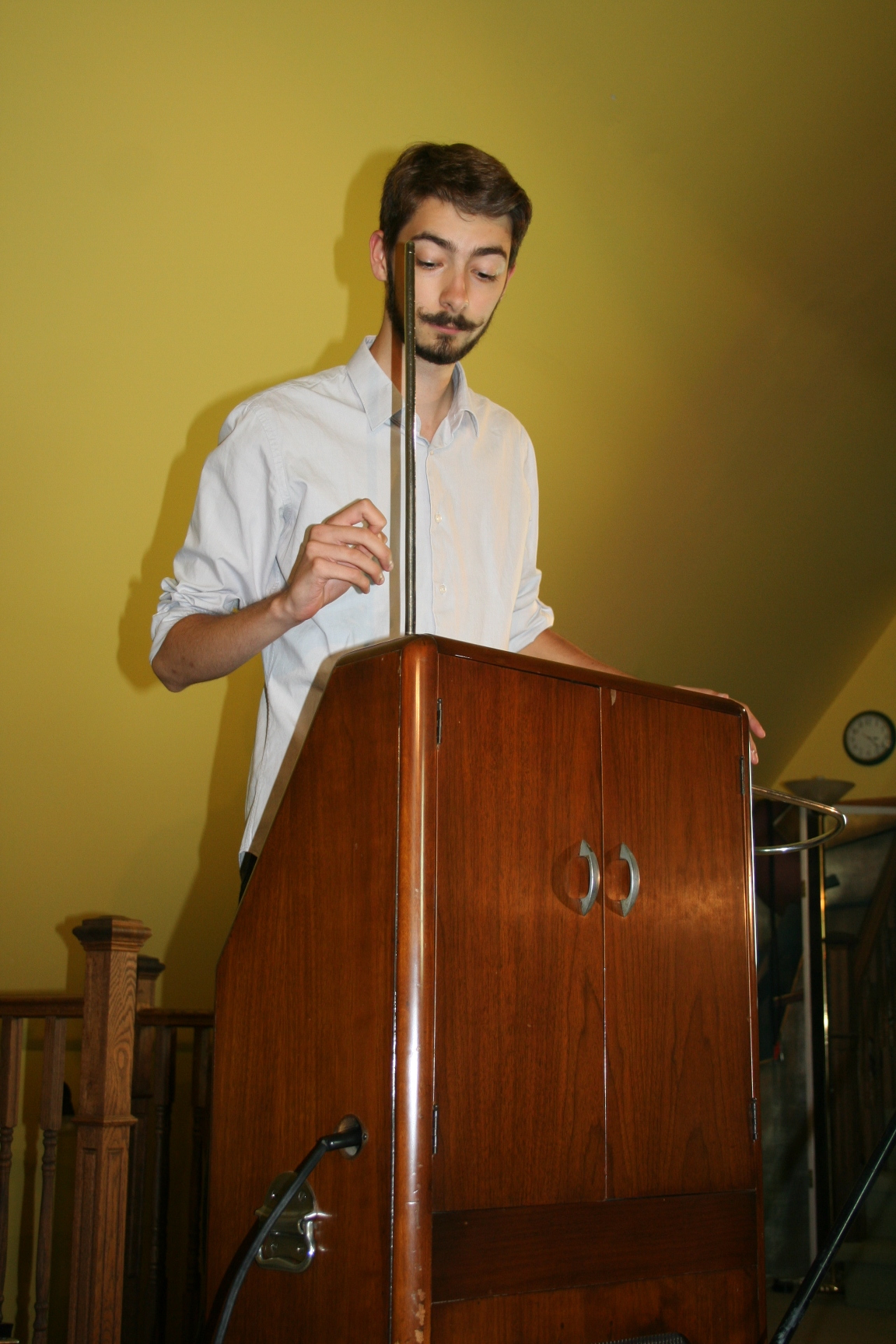
- Grégoire Blanc in 2019
- Born: 1996; Paris, France
- Education: École nationale supérieure d'arts et métiers
- Occupation(s): Musician; Multi-instrumentalist; YouTuber
- Musical career
- Genres: Classical; Electronic; Rock
- Occupation: Musician
- Instrument(s): Theremin; Cello; Piano; Musical saw Continuum Fingerboard
- Years active: Since 2014
- Website: gregoireblanc.com/en/home/

Grégoire Blanc (born in 1996) is a French musician who plays the theremin and the musical saw.

== Biography ==
=== Early life ===
Born in Paris, Grégoire began studying cello at the age of four alongside other musical instruments.

At the age of 15, he heard about the theremin and developed a passion for the instrument. Encouraged to work on a playing technique by his cello teacher, he then published a few videos on YouTube which attracted the attention of a wide audience. In 2013, a video of him performing Debussy's Clair de Lune garnered more than 5 million views. Meeting renowned thereminists such as Carolina Eyck and Lydia Kavina, helped him to go a step further.

He graduated from École nationale supérieure d'arts et métiers in 2018. A year later, he decided to devote himself entirely to his musical career.

=== Musical style ===
As a classically trained musician, Blanc aims to contribute to legitimize the theremin, to "get audiences to appreciate the theremin’s tones as music, and not just a curiosity". He also mentioned his desire to escape from the classical repertoire.

He frequently collaborates with other musicians including pianists, symphonic orchestras and organists in public performances and online. His dexterity and intense musicality combined with his height and long fingers prove advantageous for the practice of theremin.

In 2020, he was involved with Moog Music in the development and marketing of a brand new model of theremin, alongside thereminists Dorit Chrysler and Pamelia Stickney.

In 2022, he released À ses derniers pas, entrant dans la boue, an album of new music for theremin, piano and continuum fingerboard by Canadian composer Aleks Schürmer. The album, released on the Canadian Music Centre's label, Centredisc, is Blanc's first recital album.

== Discography ==
=== Album ===
- New York Theremin Society – Theremin 100 (2020)
- Aleks Schürmer – À ses derniers pas, entrant dans la boue (2022)

=== Film music ===
Source : Internet Movie Database

- Holy Beasts (2019)
- Es war einmal in Deutschland... (2017)
- Ondes noires (2017)
