= Puracane =

- Origin: New York City, United States
- Genres: Trip hop, Electronic
- Years active: 1999–2011
- Labels: Ubiquity, Astraea Records, Bulletspace Records
- Members: Ali Rogers; Juan Masotta; Chris Lee; Susan Elinger; David Leatherwood
- Past members: David Biegel; Knox Chandler; Andrew Griffiths; Drew Thurlow; Tony Diodore
- Website: www.puracanemusic.com

Puracane were an electronic music band from New York, featuring Ali Rogers on vocals, Juan Masotta on guitar and programming, David Leatherwood on bass, Susan Elinger on Piano, and Tony Diodore on guitar and violin.

== History ==
Puracane formed in 1999, originally as the duo of Ali Rogers and programmer/producer David Biegel (who has also recorded under the name Skyjuice and as a member of Bugs). The track Big Day was also on the soundtrack to the Snowboarding film Northparks.

Puracane's first album, Things You Should Leave Alone was released in 2000 on Ubiquity Records. It featured former Psychedelic Furs guitarist Knox Chandler and was positively received, with Allmusic reviewer Pemberton Roach giving it four stars and calling it "everything a good trip-hop album should be" and "exceptionally accessible", also comparing Rogers' vocals to Björk. CMJ New Music Report called the album a "devastating debut". Both reviewers compared the group's sound to Tricky. The album reached number 78 on the CMJ Top 200.

Following the album's release, Puracane toured as a live band without Biegel, with Sting, Jane's Addiction, and Depeche Mode.

Their second album, In Limbo: The Lost Puracane Sessions was released in 2006.

In 2008, Andrew Griffiths and Drew Thurlow went on to pursue other projects. Juan and Ali focused on completing their album I've Been Here The Longest, which was released in the Summer of 2009 on Astraea Records. In May 2011 Puracane released the 6-song EP Evil for the Greater Good with Chris Lee joining them on bass as a "pay what you will" download.

== Discography ==
=== Albums ===
- Things You Should Leave Alone (2000), Ubiquity
- In Limbo: The Lost Puracane Sessions (2006), Bulletspace
- I've Been Here The Longest (June 2009), Astraea

=== EPs ===
- "14 Nights" / "Things You Should Leave Alone" (remixes) (1999), Ubiquity
- Evil For The Greater Good - (May 2011)
