= Mike Sheridan =

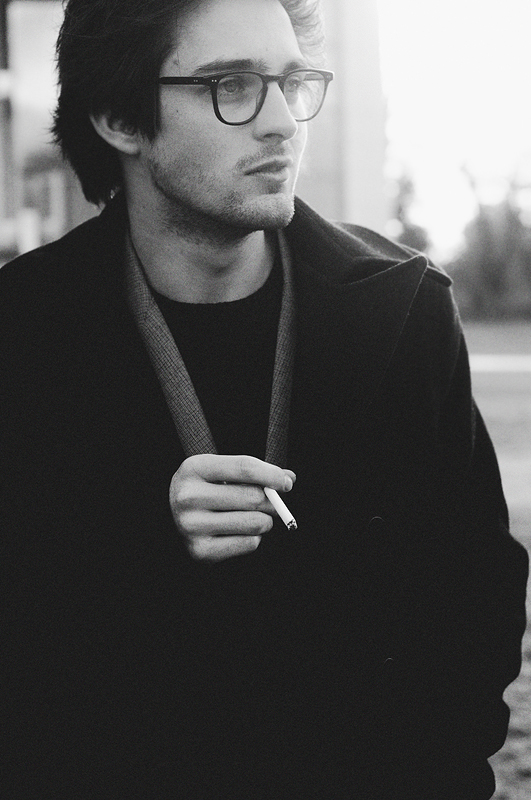

Background information
- Born: 25 October 1991 (age 34)
- Origin: Copenhagen, Denmark
- Genres: Dub techno Ambient; Downtempo
- Occupations: Producer, DJ
- Years active: 2007–present
- Labels: Playground Music; MIS Records

Mike Sheridan (born 25 October 1991) is a Danish DJ and producer of electronic music.

== Career ==
Sheridan began producing music at the age of eight, and was signed by an indie label when he was 14 years old. At the age of 15 he had already appeared on multiple compilations, showcased his music on national TV, played over 70 gigs at clubs that required him to be accompanied by a parent and released his first EP, "Alt & Intet", on MIS Records.

His debut album, I Syv Sind, came out on Playground Music Scandinavia in 2008 and won a Danish Grammy for "Best Electronica Album", spending six weeks on national record chart. His single "Med Små Skridt" spent several months at number 1 on iTunes Denmark.

In 2009, Sheridan played at Roskilde, one of the five largest annual European music festivals.

== Discography ==
=== Studio albums ===
Year	Album	Peak position	Label
Year	Album	DAN	Label
2008	I Syv Sind	12	Playground Music Scandinavia
2012	Ved Første Øjekast	13	Playground Music Scandinavia
2023	Atmospherics	13	Playground Music Scandinavia

=== EPs ===
Year	Title	Peak position	Label
Year	Title	DAN	Label
2007	Alt & Intet		MIS Records

=== Singles ===
Year	Single	Peak position	Label
Year	Single	DAN	Label
2008	Stilhed (ft. Frida Hilarius)		Playground Music Scandinavia
2008	Med Små Skridt (with Maya Albana)	15	Playground Music Scandinavia
2009	Too Close (with Mads Langer)		—N/a
