= The Life of Clutchy Hopkins =

Studio album by Clutchy Hopkins
- Released: 2005
- Genre: Electronic, hip hop, jazz, funk
- Length: 38:06
- Label: Crate Digler

The Life of Clutchy Hopkins is the debut album by musician Clutchy Hopkins. It was released in 2005 under the label Crate Digler.

== Track listing ==
1. "3:06" – 3:08
2. "3:02" – 3:01
3. "4:08" – 4:10
4. "3:25" – 3:26
5. "2:15" – 2:16
6. "3:11" – 3:15
7. "2:07" – 2:08
8. "3:26" – 3:27
9. "3:34" – 3:35
10. "3:05" – 3:06
11. "3:14" – 3:15
12. "3:24" – 3:24
