= Eric Lau =

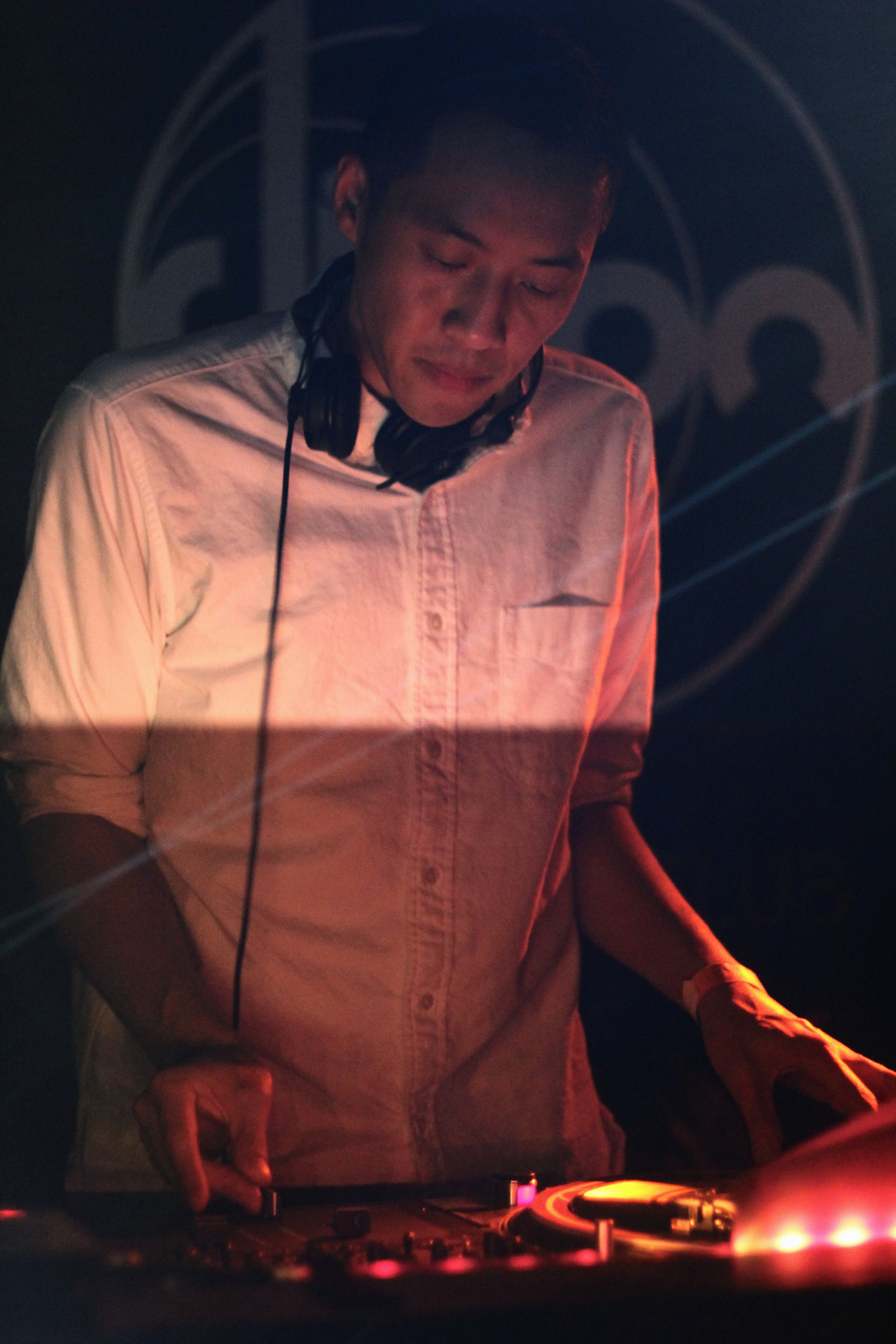
- Lau in 2014

Background information
- Born: 10 November 1981 (age 44)
- Origin: London, United Kingdom
- Genres: Hip-Hop, R&B, Soul
- Years active: 2005 – present
- Labels: Fat City Recordings, Kilawatt, Ubiquity Records

Eric Lau is a British music producer and DJ from London, England. His production style is characterised by heavy drums, often unrecognisable samples and a mixture of live and sequenced instrumentation.

== Career ==
Lau first gained exposure with the song "Im Fine" featuring Rahel on Gilles Peterson's Brownswood Bubblers (Part 4).

He released his debut album "New Territories" in 2008 on Ubiquity Records to critical acclaim. Straight No Chaser wrote "New Territories represents the arrival of a talented artist and perceptive one-man production house."

== Discography ==
=== Studio albums ===
- New Territories (2008)
- Makin' Sound (2010)
- Quadrivium (2011)
- One of Many (2013)

=== EPs and singles ===
- Presents Dudley And Friends (2006)
- Producer No. 1 (2007)
- Kilawatt V2 (2010)
- The Mission - EP (2012)
- "What I'd Rather" - Single (2012)
- "Everytime" (feat. Rahel) - Single (2013)
