= Grand Avenue (band) =

Danish rock band

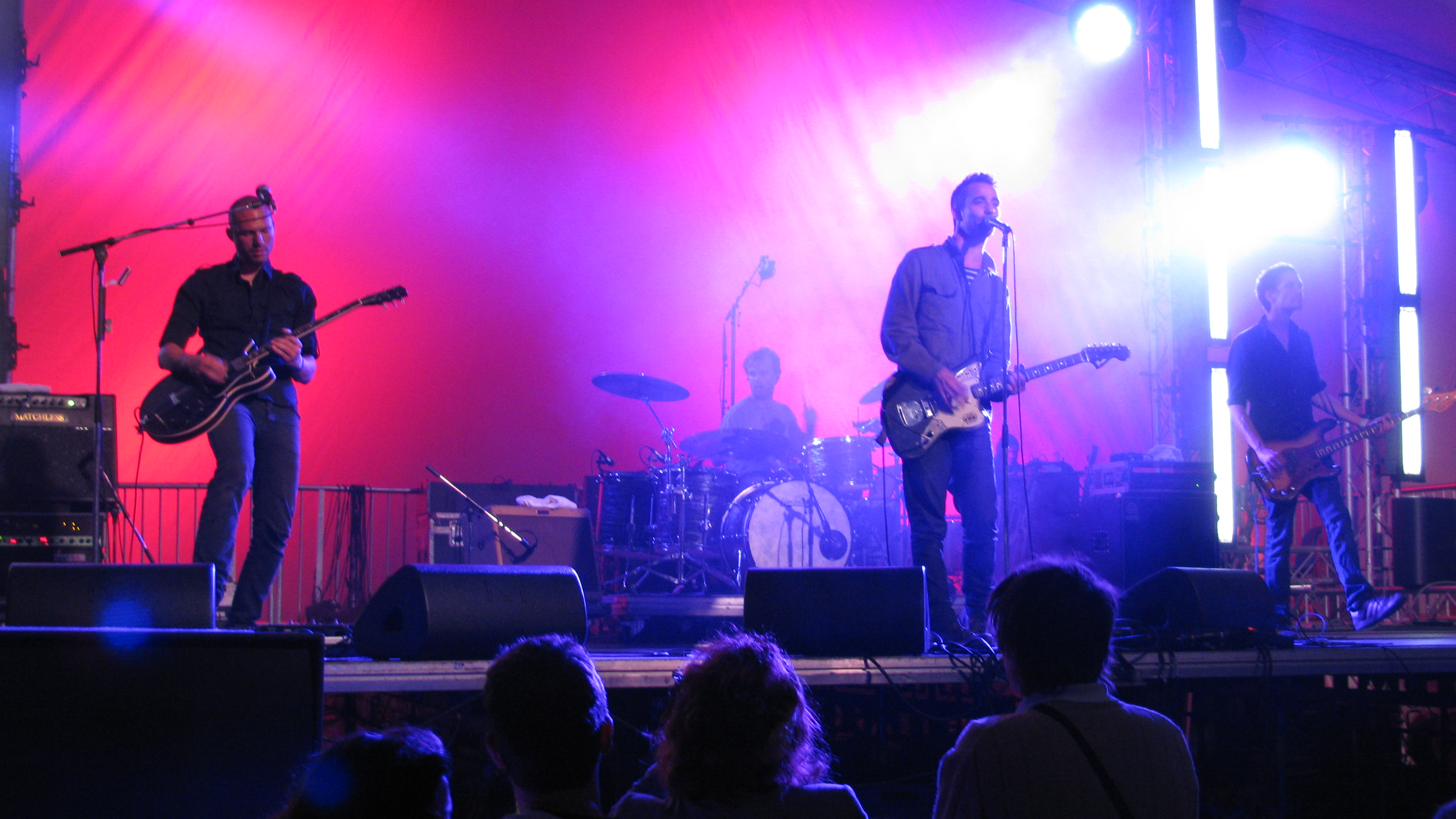
- Grand Avenue in Lyngby (2009)

Background information
- Origin: Copenhagen, Denmark
- Genres: Rock, alternative rock, motif rock
- Years active: 2001–present
- Labels: Playground Music Scandinavia
- Members: Rasmus Walter; Niels-Kristian Bærentzen; Marc Stebbing; Hjalte Thygesen

Grand Avenue is a Danish rock band formed in 2001. The band consists of Rasmus Walter (vocals, guitar), Niels-Kristian Bærentzen (guitar), Marc Stebbing (bass) and Hjalte Thygesen (drums).

== History ==
The four band members met at a musical college in London in 1997. Frontman Rasmus Walter and lead guitarist Bærentzen started to write songs together, and with the addition of Stebbing and Thygesen Grand Avenue was formed. The band released a single in 2003 called "What's on Your Mind", which became "Ugens Uundgåelige" (the most played number on the radio station for a week) on Danish Radio P3 and caught the attention of EMI. The band signed with the record company and released their debut album Grand Avenue in 2003.

In 2005, the band moved to New York City to record their follow-up album She, working with producer Bryce Goggin. The album was released in 2005.

During 2006 the band started working on their third album, The Outside which was released in 2007. It was produced by Irishman Richard Rainey. Again, the band had a "Ugens Uundgåelige" with the single "The Outside."

Rainey also produced Grand Avenue's fourth album, Place to Fall, released on 28 September 2009 in Denmark. The first single from the album was "Almost Gone".

== In popular culture ==
Their song "She" was featured in the film Cashback. It was a part of the movie's soundtrack and it was performed as a different version for the movie.

The song "Ordinary" was featured in an episode of the television series Kyle XY.

And the song "On Your Side" was licensed for commercial use to the Danish dairy producer Arla Foods in 2008, for use in the "Closer to Nature" series, directed by Peter Thwaites.

== Discography ==
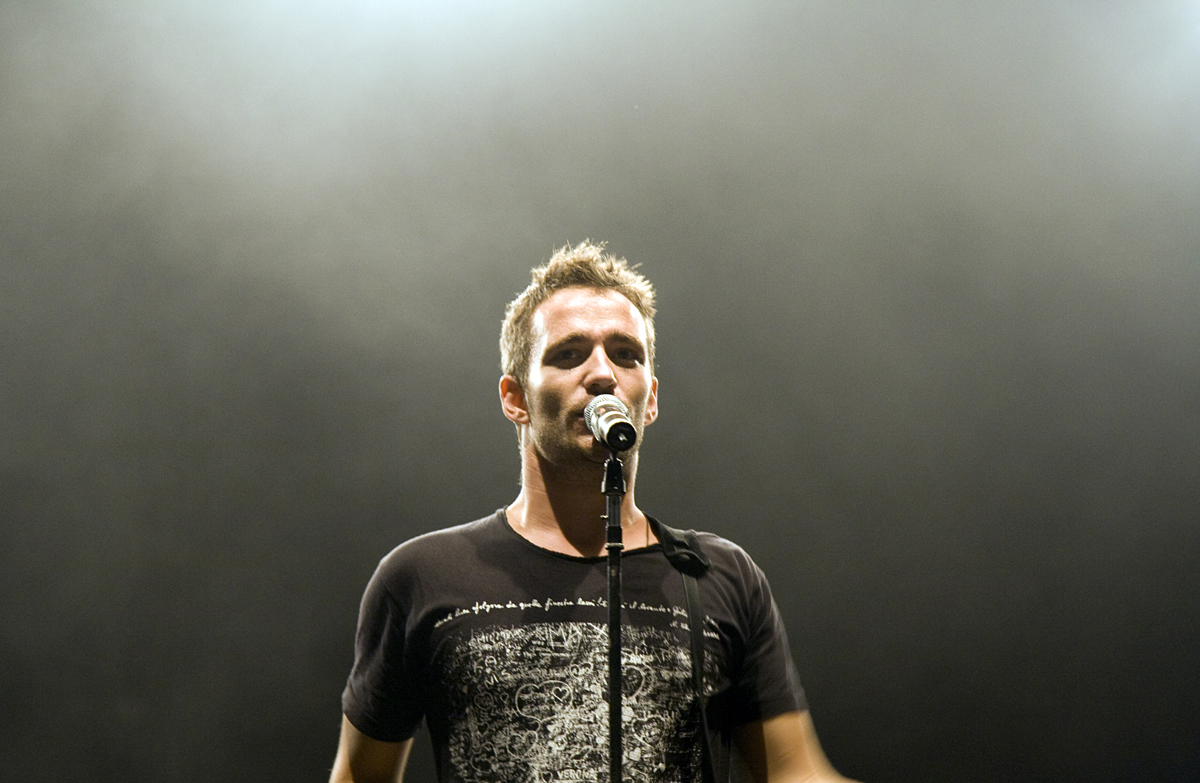
Vocalist Rasmus Walter

Year	Title	Peak position	Certification
Year	Title	DAN	Certification
2003	Grand Avenue	27	
2005	She	10	
2007	The Outside	13	
2009	Place to Fall	18	
