= Edmund Eagan =

Edmund Eagan is a Canadian television composer, sound designer, and musician based in Ottawa, Ontario, Canada. He was the recipient of a 1992 Gemini Award for Best Original Music Score for a Program or Mini-Series for the Canadian television animated production The Woman Who Raised a Bear as Her Son. Eagan has been nominated several times for Gemini Awards. He composed the music for the television show This Hour Has 22 Minutes.

== Career ==
Eagan worked on a number of television productions, including CBC's The Health Show, the TV program Curiosities and in the Man Alive documentary Beyond Belief.

He also collaborated with choreographer Tedd Robinson on the latter's dance work "Rigamarole".

Eagan is the proprietor of Twelfth Root Studios, and has been involved in the design and evolution of the Haken Audio Continuum Fingerboard, including mechanical and operational issues, as well as principal sound design for the internal sound engine of the Continuum Fingerboard.

In 2017 Eagan performed at the ConinuuCom festival in Asheville. In 2018 he is the Artist-in-Residence at Carleton University.

== See also ==
- Music of Canada
- List of Canadian musicians
