= Ulrich Krieger =

German composer and performer (born 1962)

Ulrich Krieger (born 1962 in Freiburg) is a German contemporary composer, performer, improviser and experimental rock musician based in Los Angeles.

Krieger's artistic work spans a broad field from contemporary classical composition and free improvisation to experimental fusion with electronic music, rock, metal and noise. His special interest lies in the exploration of the physical fringes between acoustic and electronic produced sounds. In his music and with his instrument, the saxophone, he developed an original style of playing he calls "acoustic electronics". Acoustic electronics is about using sounds that appear to be electronic but are actually produced on acoustic instruments. His probably best known experimental project with acoustic electronics is the transcription of Lou Reed's guitar feedback opus Metal Machine Music, which he rearranged for chamber orchestra.
In his works for saxophone Krieger uses extended instrumental techniques, microsounds, electronic manipulation, and saxophone-controlled feedbacks. He defies stylistic boundaries, and the sonic result of this approach, as the Los Angeles Times critic Ann Powers describes it, "ranges wide as he seeks the spots where noise and beauty meet".

== Career ==
=== Early career (New Music and dissociation) ===
Krieger studied classical saxophone, composition, electronic music and musicology at the Manhattan School of Music (New York), the Universität der Künste (Berlin) and the Freie Universität (Berlin). He further pursued independent studies and research in the didjeridu and Australian Aboriginal music and culture. In his early years he studied in depth the contemporary music of the European post-war avant-garde and won related prices and residencies. Later he started to distinguish himself from the established New Music scene which in a 2007 interview he called "in a phase of mannerism and in a crisis".

=== American music ===
Since the late 1980s he became more and more interested in American music and its different approaches (chance music, process music, just intonation, multi-stylistic, minimalism, drone). In 1991 he moved to New York. In the 'Cage of Saxophones' series Krieger recorded the complete saxophone and any-instrument works of John Cage for Mode Records.

John Cage authorized Krieger's arrangement of Ryoanji and Two for saxophone. A long term collaboration connects him with drone pioneer Phill Niblock, who wrote several pieces for him. He performs on Niblock releases like YPGTPN or Touch Food. Krieger worked intensively on minimalist music, which he explored on his two 'Walls of Sound' releases. The first one focuses on drone music (Cage, Tenney, Niblock), while the second focuses on pattern music (Reich, Glass, Riley).

A subject that can be found throughout his work is what he calls static music, which explores the microcosms of sound beyond semantic, narrative or dramatic gesture. It consists of elements like long tones and drones, repetition and layers of sustained pitches. The result is an aural sculpture, an intense physical experience with the whole body, a physics and physical approach to the phenomenon of Sounds that are continuous and three-dimensional. The same elements can be found in noise and metal music, styles Krieger includes in his newer experimental projects.

=== Electronic Music / Noise and Silent Music ===
In the early 1990s he started working on a more electronic approach. He began developing an original amplification for the saxophone and various live-electronic signal processing set-ups. In the electronic experimental field he collaborated with rock, noise and ambient artists like Karkowski, Merzbow, Koener, Toeplitz. He also worked with the Berlin ensemble "zeitkratzer" for which he transcribed Lou Reed's Metal Machine Music. The original LP consists of one hour of guitar feedback noise. Although considered impossible Krieger scored the piece for amplified acoustic instruments, creating an orchestral work that had a new sound: classical chamber music instruments that sounded like electronic music. This arrangement has since then only been performed by the Great Learning Orchestra, Stockholm. Around the same time he started working with the 'silent music' composers, specially of the Wandelweiser group such as Malfatti, Beuger, and Pisaro.

=== Recent projects ===
The basic pattern of long tones and drones, which he worked on his walls of sound releases, is still a matter of exploration in his recent, more experimental and improvising formations. More recently he intensified his acoustic electronics saxophone approach in diverse experimental band projects. Text of Light is a 2001 founded formation with Lee Ranaldo and Alan Licht, performing along with films of experimental film maker Stan Brakhage (1933–2003).

Metal Machine Trio began in 2008 together with Lou Reed and Sarth Calhoun as an experimental free rock project.
In September 2007 he moved to California, where he is professor for composition and experimental sound practice at the California Institute of the Arts.

In 2017 Krieger composed "Finnegans Longstone," an adapted passage from James Joyce's Finnegans Wake for the Waywords and Meansigns project.

In April 2021 Krieger presented (together with Wiktor Kociuban) the composition "Bergmal", the excerpts of this multidisciplinary project was presented and streamed under the baton of Kociuban and with Delirium Ensemble.

Krieger provided contrabass clarinet, saxophones, and conducted string arrangements for experimental rock group Sprain on their 2023 album The Lamb as Effigy.

== Selected discography ==
=== As Composer and Improviser ===
- Ulrich Krieger – Winters in the Abyss (Pogus Productions, 2015)
- Ulrich Krieger – [Urban Dreamings] (Mode, 2015)
- Ulrich Krieger – Cycles (Imminent Frequencies, 2014)
- VA — The Orchestra of Futurist Noise Intoners (Sub Rosa, 2013)
- Lucia Mense — Electric Counterpoint (satelita 04, 2011)
- Ulrich Krieger — Fathom (Sub Rosa, 2010)
- VA — Expérience de vol #7: Pure Noise (artzoyd, 2009)
- Ulrich Krieger — Up & Down 23 (b-boim, 2009)
- Metal Machine Trio — The Creation of the Universe (Best Seat In The House Production, 2008)
- Zeitkratzer — Metal Machine Music (Asphodel, 2007)
- Text of Light — 012805 Rotterdam 1 (Room40, 2007)
- Text of Light — Un Pranzo Favoloso (FinalMusik, 2007)
- VA — Airport Symphonie (Room40, 2007)
- Zeitkratzer — Soundinx (Zeitkratzer Records, 1999)

=== As Interpreter ===
- Harry Partch — Plectra and Percussion Dances (Bridge, 2014)
- John Cage — A Cage of Saxophones, Vol.3&4 (Mode, 2010)
- Radu Malfatti — Wechseljahre einer Hyäne (b-boim, 2007)
- Giacinto Scelsi — Canti Del Capricorno (Wergo, 2007)
- Luciano Berio — The Complete Sequenzas (Mode, 2006)
- Phill Niblock — Touch Three (Touch, 2006)
- John Cage — A Cage of Saxophones, Vol.2 (Mode, 2006)
- Ulrich Krieger — Walls of Sound II (Sub Rosa, 2004)
- John Cage — A Cage of Saxophones, Vol.1 (Mode, 2002)
