= Rasmus Walter =

Danish singer and guitarist

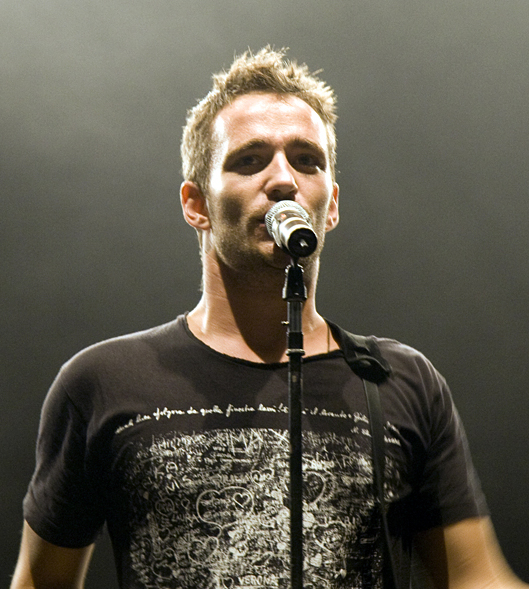

Background information
- Born: Rasmus Walter-Hansen; Aarhus, Denmark
- Genres: Pop rock
- Occupations: Singer, musician, songwriter
- Instruments: Vocals, guitar
- Years active: 2003–present
- Formerly of: Grand Avenue
- Website: rasmuswalter.com

Rasmus Walter-Hansen is a Danish singer and guitarist originating from Aarhus. He is twin-brother of filmmaker Anders Walter. His debut album was the self-titled Rasmus Walter in 2011 with debut single being "Dybt vand".

Prior to a solo career, Walter was the lead vocalist and guitarist of the pop rock band Grand Avenue, which included Niels-Kristian Bærentzen (guitar), Marc Stebbing (bass), and Hjalte Thygesen (drums).

== Discography ==
=== Albums ===
as Grand Avenue

- 2003: Grand Avenue
- 2005: She
- 2007: The Outside
- 2009: Place to Fall

Solo

Year	Title	Peak position	Certification
Year	Title	DEN	Certification
2011	Rasmus Walter	15	
2012	Lige Her Lige Nu	3	
2014	Verden I Stå	1	Gold
2016	Himmelflugt	4	

Solo live

Year	Title	Peak position	Certification
Year	Title	DEN	Certification
2015	Live	11	

=== Singles ===
Solo

Single	Title	Peak position	Certification	Album
Single	Title	DEN	Certification	Album
2011	"Dybt vand"	–		Rasmus Walter
2012	"Endeløst"	6	Gold	Lige Her Lige Nu
2013	"Dybt vand" (rerelease)	34		Rasmus Walter
2013	"Drik ud"	26		
2014	"Jeg har lagt mine våben"	11		
2014	"Dum for dig"	19		
2014	"Verden i stå"	28		
2014	"Indtil du lægger mig på plads"	38		

Others

Single	Title	Peak position	Album
Single	Title	DEN	Album
2014	"Her langs muren"	38	Toppen af poppen – Synger Pool Krebs
