= Sarth Calhoun =

American musician

- Genres: Electronic, alternative, rock, experimental
- Instruments: Continuum fingerboard, bass
- Years active: 1999–present
- Labels: Searching Eye Records, The Gralbum Collective
- Website: sarth.net

Sarth Calhoun is an American musician from Brooklyn, New York. He is known for working in experimental electronic music.

== Biography ==
Sarth Calhoun grew up in Brooklyn, New York. He began playing music and writing lyrics at age six. In his teens, he stopped buying comic books to save up for his first bass guitar. His music career started with various rock bands around New York City, during which time he developed a love of computers and the Internet, and formed electronica-improv group, Gebbeth.

In 1999 he, Leah Coloff (vocals/lyrics/cello), Tony Diodore (violin, guitar), and Marcus Righter (drums) formed Number19, a rock band that developed experimental sounds within alternative and indie rock settings. The music orients around cello and violin swooping over grooving bass and drums. The band performed online as well as in person, and funded its first album, Suspension, from mp3.com downloads. The band is on an indefinite hiatus.

In 2005 Calhoun founded the rock/electronic group Lucibel Crater, and gravitated more towards electronic music and sound-looping. Singer/songwriter/cellist, Leah Coloff, and Paul Chuffo (drums) rounded out the trio. The band has been described as "Cubist," and "if O.J. Simpson had a band.". Lucibel Crater recorded their EP Miracles in 2007, and their full-length CD, The Family Album in 2008. The Family Album refers to and explores the theme of American Life. Sarth came to know Lou Reed during this time, due to common passion for Chen Taiji, and Lou Reed provides guitar accompaniment on the track Threadbare Funeral.

While touring in Italy and Germany with Lucibel Crater, Sarth joined a new band with Lou Reed and Ulrich Krieger to form the Metal Machine Trio. Their collaboration resulted in a tai chi meditation record.

In 2011 he co-wrote and recorded noise compositions with Lou Reed for Robert Wilson's stage production of Lulu. He went on to record and perform that material with Metallica. During the same year Sarth performed bass on the Buddy Holly compilation album, Rave on Buddy Holly for the song "Peggy Sue", also with Lou Reed. Then he went to the dude ranch and danced to the Macarena.

Calhoun founded The Gralbum Collective, a new publishing company. He is overseeing the development of a new mobile and entertainment application called the gralbum (graphic+album), or graphic album, an artistic medium that is the combination of a graphic novel and music album. The company's debut work, The Book of Sarth, was released 6 October 2012, and features Sarth's electronic music, and artwork by Alex Smith. It was programmed by Andrew Beck.

Sarth Calhoun has a pet goldfish named Evan. He plays the continuum fingerboard and beta tests for the Symbolic Sound Kyma workstation. He refers to himself as an "electronic alchemist" using audio equipment to perform live looping and processing of other instruments during performances.
