= Symbolic Sound Corporation =

American music software company

Symbolic Sound Corporation was founded by Carla Scaletti and Kurt J. Hebel in 1989 as a spinoff of the CERL Sound Group at the Computer-based Education Research Laboratory of the University of Illinois at Urbana–Champaign. Originally named Kymatics, the company was incorporated as Symbolic Sound Corporation in March 1990. Symbolic Sound's products are being used in sound design for music, film, advertising, television, speech and hearing research, computer games, and other virtual environments. The company is based in Bozeman, Montana.

Kyma, Symbolic Sound's main product, was one of the earliest commercially available examples of a graphical signal flow language for real time digital audio signal processing. The Kyma Sound design language, based on Smalltalk, continues to evolve and runs on several generations of DSP processing units.

The company has developed and commercialized several audio processing and synthesis techniques, including real time spectral analysis and additive resynthesis, audio morphing, aggregate synthesis, granular synthesis, and Tau synthesis. They have also developed algorithms for partitioning a signal flow graph to run on multiple parallel processors and multiple devices in real time.
