= Shawn Lee (musician) =

American musician, producer, video game composer and multi-instrumentalist (born 1963)

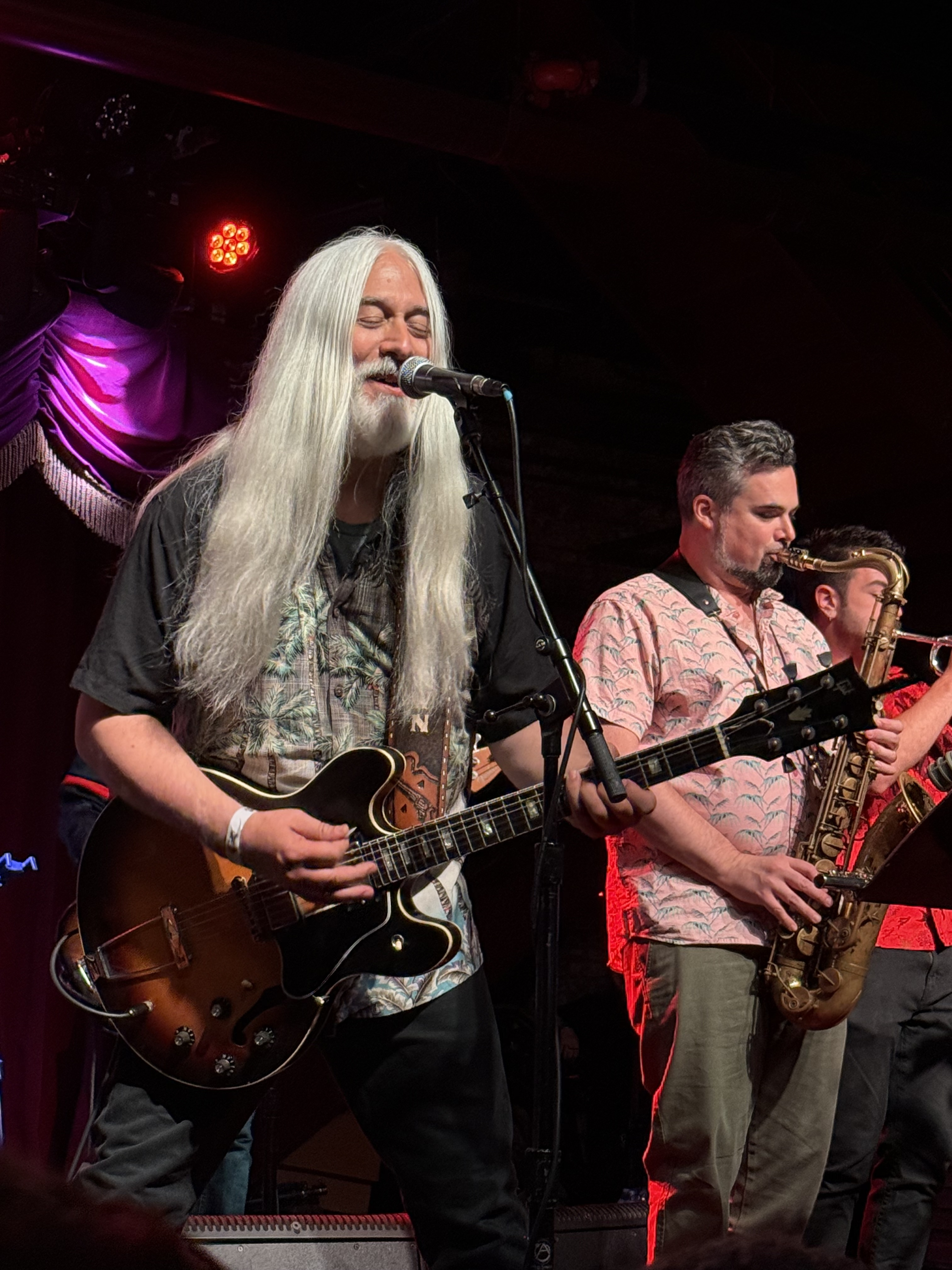
- Lee performing with Young Gun Silver Fox in Brooklyn, 2025

Background information
- Born: Shawn Lee Mahan; December 28, 1963 (age 62); Wichita, Kansas, U.S.
- Origin: London, England
- Genres: Electronica; psychedelic; soundtrack
- Occupations: Musician; composer; producer
- Instruments: Vocals; guitar; bass; drums; keyboards
- Years active: 1993–present
- Labels: Ubiquity; Wall of Sound; ESL; BBE; Ultra; RUSH!; Talkin' Loud; Park the Van; Extreme Music; Pedigree Cuts; Silver Fox Records
- Website: shawnlee.net

Shawn Lee (born December 28, 1963) is an American musician, producer, composer and multi-instrumentalist. He is the co-founder of London-based soft rock duo Young Gun Silver Fox, along with Andy Platts. He is known for creating the entire score for the video games Bully (2006) and The Getaway (2002). His song, "Kiss the Sky", was featured in the Telltale video game Tales from the Borderlands (2014) and is used as the title track in Apple TV's Hijack.

== Career ==
Shawn Lee was born to a mother of Lebanese and American Indian ancestry and a father of Irish American ancestry. Lee has relocated twice in pursuit of his career. He moved to Los Angeles in 1988, where he worked with The Dust Brothers and Jeff Buckley. After being in various bands, performing on The Tonight Show, a publishing deal with EMI and touring on Lollapolooza, Lee moved to London, England. There he signed a solo record deal with Talkin' Loud.

This resulted in an album, Discomfort, which was only promo-released in France in 1996. In 2000, Lee released Monkey Boy on Wall of Sound Records. The album included Lee's song "Happiness", which was later recorded by million-selling British artist Will Young.

2004 saw the release of album Soul Visa, in Japan only, on Rush Production. Soul Visa was later released in 2006 worldwide under the BBE label. The album Harmonium was released in 2005 in Japan, again under Rush.

As Shawn Lee's Ping Pong Orchestra, Lee has released eleven albums on US label Ubiquity Records and one under his own label Silver Fox Records: Music and Rhythm, Moods and Grooves, Voices and Choices, Strings and Things, A Very Ping Pong Christmas: Funky Treats From Santa's Bag, Hits the Hits, Miles of Styles, Under the Sun, Hooked Up Classics, World of Funk, Reel to Reel, and Techstar.

Lee's music has appeared in many films such as Ocean's Thirteen, The Break-Up, and Confessions of a Shopaholic, as well as on television series, such as CSI: Miami, S.W.A.T., Lost, Desperate Housewives, Nip/Tuck, Ugly Betty, and Eastbound and Down, and the Mack Dawg Productions snowboard movie Picture This. Lee also scored the Rockstar Games video game Bully in 2006. Bully was twice nominated for best score from GameSpot (winner) and Spike VGA (Video Game Awards). He composed some pieces for The Getaway before working on Bully's score.

Lee also scored the UK/Swiss feature film Save Angel Hope, which is yet to be released. The 2008 surf documentary film Under The Sun also features an original Shawn Lee soundtrack released on Ubiquity Records. In 2009, his song "Kiss the Sky" with Nino Moschella was featured on the second-season finale of Life, as well as in the first-season finale of the HBO comedy Eastbound & Down and the penultimate episode of the fifth season of Nip/Tuck.

Lee continues to live in London, working on an array of new albums in his studio "Trans-Yank." These include collaborations with Clutchy Hopkins, Tony Joe White, Darondo, Money Mark, and Tommy Guerrero. He also frequently performs with London-based electronica band Psapp, both on record and at live performances.

In 2011, Lee collaborated on an art exhibition with French visual artist Gerald Petit in Lyon, titled "A Conversation Piece". They collaborated after that on the LP "La musique électronique", with AM, Gerald creating the visuals for the album and the single "2 times". In 2023, they worked together on the Gerald Petit's solo exhibition, "Ni île", at Frac Normandie Caen, for which Shawn made an emotional performance in regard of the installation "Touch the Sky" (2023), for which he played 3 different versions of a guitar composition that Gerald Petit wrote in 2004, while he was living in New York. And more is yet to come..."

Since 2011, Lee has collaborated with indie artist AM, whom he showcased with at the 2011 South By Southwest Music Festival (SXSW) in Austin, Texas. AM & Shawn Lee released their debut album Celestial Electric to critical acclaim in September 2011 on ESL Music. The first single from the album, "Dark Into Light," was released on limited edition 12-inch vinyl on the Ubiquity label on April 16, 2011, in honor of Record Store Day. When Rob Garza from Thievery Corporation heard the collaboration, he signed the debut album Celestial Electric to his record label ESL (Eighteenth Street Lounge). AM & Shawn Lee brought their second album La Musique Numérique to Park The Van Records.

Shawn Lee is also one half of Young Gun Silver Fox along with Andy Platts. They have released five albums: West End Coast in 2015, AM Waves in 2018, Canyons in 2020, Ticket to Shangri-La in 2022, and Pleasure in 2025.

== Discography ==
=== Shawn Lee ===
==== Albums ====
- Discomfort (Talkin' Loud, 1996)
- Planet of the Breaks (Time + Space, 1998)
- Beneath the Planet of the Breaks (Zero-G, 2000)
- Monkeyboy (Wall of Sound, 2000)
- Ape Breaks Vol 1-5 (Ubiquity, 2002–2003)
- Soul Visa (Rush!, 2004)
- Harmonium (Rush!, 2005)
- Bully Original Soundtrack (Ultra, 2006)
- Psychedelic Percussion (Pedigree Cuts, 2008)
- Soul in the Hole (Ubiquity, 2009)
- Soul in the Hole Instrumentals (Ubiquity, 2009)
- Sing a Song (Ubiquity, 2010)
- Sing a Song (Instrumental) (Ubiquity, 2010)
- Beats Between the Sheets (Pedigree Cuts, 2012)
- Synthesizers in Space (ESL Music, 2012)
- Soul Food 2 (Pedigree Cuts, 2013)
- Zombie Playground OST (Wonderfulsound, 2013)
- Golden Age Against the Machine (Barely Breaking Even, 2014)
- New York Street Funk (Pedigree Cuts, 2016)
- Shawn Lee's Soul Grooves (Pedigree Cuts, 2017)
- Rides Again (Légère Recordings, 2019)
- Shawn Lee Kung Fu Christmas (Silver Fox Records, 2021)
- Rides Yet Again (Légère Recordings, 2022)
- Shawn Lee's Soulscapes (Pedigree Cuts, 2022)

==== Singles and EPs ====
- "Cryin' Blue ('Til My Eyes Are Red)" (Talkin' Loud, 1996)
- "A Little Discomfort" (Talkin' Loud, 1996)
- "You Seem to Have Forgotten What Music Was Mutha Phucka! EP" (Idlesound, 1999)
- "I Can't Save You" (We Love You/WOS, 2000)
- "Kill Somebody" (We Love You/WOS, 2000)
- "Happiness" (We Love You/WOS, 2000)
- "Unpaid Debt" (For Us/Rough Trade, 2000)
- "The Mattress" (Eclectic Breaks, 2000)
- "So Much Trouble" (Scenario, 2004)
- "Mary Jane" (BBE, 2006)
- "Save the Music 12" #1" (Ubiquity, 2011)
- "Music for TV, Films & Commercials" (None/Unknown, 2011)
- "He Ain't Heavy" (None/Unknown, 2012)
- "The Word Jam" (Paris DJs, 2013)
- "Memphis (Instrumental)" (Point Blank, 2015)

==== Demos ====
- 1993 Demo Tape (52nd Street, 1993)

==== Appearances ====
- We Love You – We Love You... So Love Us (Tracks: "The Sun") (Wall Of Sound, 2000)
- We Love You – We ♥ Yule (Tracks: "I'll Be F**king You This Christmas") (Wall Of Sound, 2000)
- Andrew Hale – The Getaway OST (Tracks: N/A) (Unreleased, 2002)
- We Love You – Yule ❤ Us (Tracks: "Sometimes It Snows In April") (Wall Of Sound, 2004)
- Ubiquity Records – Rewind! Vol. 4 (Tracks: "River Man") (Ubiquity, 2004)
- We Love You – We ❤ Yule (Tracks: "I'll Be F**king You This Christmas", "Sometimes It Snows In April") (Wall Of Sound, 2005)
- Nick Phoenix – Drumdrops (Tracks: "Skin City", "Lowlander") (Extreme Music, 2005)
- Exit Music: Songs with Radio Heads (Tracks: "No Surprises") (Barely Breaking Even Records and Rapster Records, 2006)
- Clutchy Hopkins – Walking Backwards (Tracks: "Song For Wolfie feat. Shawn Lee") (Ubiquity, 2008)
- Alex Rizzo, Elliot Ireland & Daniel Hewson – Soul Food (Tracks: "Alex Rizzo & Elliot Ireland & Shawn Lee - Butter On Ice") (Pedigree Cuts, 2008)
- Alice Russell – Pot of Gold Remixes (Tracks: "Two Steps (Shawn Lee's 7 Inches of Soul Remix)") (Differ-Ant, 2009)
- Broadway Project – One Divided Remix EP (Tracks: "Pages Cello (Shawn Lee Remix)") (ODS Recordings, 2009)
- The Latin Project – Musica De La Noche (Tracks: "Legal (Shawn Lee Remix)") (TLP Musica Records, 2009)
- The Superimposers - CDEP 1 (Tracks: "Golden (Shawn Lee Remix)", "Golden (Shawn Lee Instrumental Remix)") (Wonderfulsound, 2009)
- BLUNDETTO - Bad bad things (Tracks: "Nautilus (feat. Shawn Lee)", "Ken Park (feat. Tommy Guerrero & Shawn Lee)", "La Carretilla (feat. Shawn Lee & Budos Band Horns)") (Heavenly Sweetness, 2010)
- Various - Cinematic Underscores 2 (Tracks: "Hammer Time", "Blue Sky Reverie", "Death Of A Dancer", "Morning Sunshine", "From The Sky") (Pedigree Cuts, 2010)
- Various - Disco Bullets (Tracks: "Disco Wristo") (Pedigree Cuts, 2010)
- Various - Dope Beatz (Tracks: "Pub Grub") (Pedigree Cuts, 2010)
- Blundetto - Bad bad things (Tracks: "Nautilus") (Heavenly Sweetness, 2010)
- Various - Organic Downbeats (Tracks: "Secret Stash", "Slowmo") (Pedigree Cuts, 2011)
- Various - Tremolo (Tracks: "Tremolow") (Pedigree Cuts, 2011)
- NOMO - Upside Down/Nocturne (Tracks: "Upside Down") (Ubiquity, 2011)
- Various - Save The Music - A Compilation For Record Store Day (Tracks: "Apostrophe (Shawn Lee mix)") (Ubiquity, 2011)
- Breakin Bread: Virgil Howe & Shawn Lee - Electronic Brain Break b/w Go Go Gadget Break 7" (Tracks: "Electronic Brain Break") (Breakin' Bread, 2011)
- BLUNDETTO - WARM MY SOUL (Tracks: "Hercules (feat. Hugh Coltman & Shawn Lee)") (Heavenly Sweetness, 2012)
- JetTricks - Stephanie / See Us Through (Tracks: "Stephanie feat. Shawn Lee") (Légère Recordings, 2012)
- SOULEANCE - La Belle Vie (Tracks: "Le Plaisir (feat Shawn Lee)") (First Word Records, 2012)
- Various - Flixploitation 2 (Tracks: "The Opener", "Setting The Trap", "Vince And The Cop") (Pedigree Cuts, 2013)
- Simon Lord - Better (The Shawn Lee Remix) (Tracks: "Better (The Shawn Lee Remix)") (Wonderfulsound, 2013)
- Various - Echos d'aujourd'hui (Tracks: "Stances à un cambrioleur") (Fanon Records, 2013)
- Paris DJs Soundsystem - Killas, Thrillas & Chillas - Foot Stompers & Freaky Soul Vol.1 (Tracks: "Simon Says") (Paris DJs, 2014)
- The Soul Surfers - Soul Rock! (Tracks: "Time Is A Gun feat. Shawn Lee") (Ubiquity, 2015)
- Various - Tricatel RSVP (Composition Instantanee Et Improvisation Collective) (Tracks: Julien Gasc/Herve Bouetard/Bertrand Burgalat/Michael Garcon/David Forgione/Renaud Gabriel Pion/Stephane Salvi - "Mysteries (feat Shawn Lee)") (Tricatel, 2015)
- MA BEAT! - Drowning For Love (Tracks: "Morocco (feat Shawn Lee)") (BMM Records, 2015)
- Mark Rae - Northern Sulphuric Soulboy (Tracks: "The Devil's Horns Featuring Shawn Lee") (Mark's Music, 2016)
- Pressure75 - Meltdown (Tracks: "Red Sea featuring Shawn Lee") (East Green Records, 2016)
- SAINT ETIENNE - Dive (Remixes) (Tracks: "Dive (Colorama & Shawn Lee remix)") (Heavenly, 2017)
- VARIOUS - Beating Heart - South Africa (Tracks: "Inkulu") (Beating Heart, 2017)
- Kirk Reed - California (Shawn Lee Mix) (Tracks: "California (Shawn Lee Mix)") (Believe! International, 2020)
- ROXY5000 - Da Ladiez Plus Mixes (Tracks: "Da ladiez The Beard Police Mix By Shawn Lee") (Roxy5000 Records, 2020)
- ROXY5000 - When Love takes over plus mixes (Tracks: "When Love takes over Feat Omar and Shawn Lee") (Roxy5000 Records, 2020)
- Soho Radio Records - V/A - 'Together' Compilation (Tracks: "The Way Things Oughta Be") (Soho Radio Records, 2020)
- Various - Digging the Kpm Vaults (Tracks: "Straight from the Harp") (KPM Music, 2020)

=== Kelly Huff ===
==== Appearances ====
- Various Artists – Giant Step New Jazz From New York (Tracks: "Straight No Chaser") (Quattro, 1993)
- Ubiquity – Is That Jazz? (Tracks: "Straight No Chaser") (Ubiquity, 1995)

=== Ping Pong ===
==== Appearances ====
- Ubiquity – Still Cookin' (Tracks: "Bebop Props feat. Kelly Huff") (Ubiquity, 1994)
- Ubiquity – Mo' Cookin' (Tracks: "Goin' Downhill feat. Kelly Huff") (Ubiquity, 1994)
- Ubiquity – Is That Jazz? (Tracks: "Schmoo'sville") (Ubiquity, 1995)
- Ubiquity – The Best Of Cookin' (Tracks: "Goin' Downhill feat. Kelly Huff", "Bebop Props feat. Kelly Huff") (Ubiquity, 2000)

=== The Pacific Jazz Alliance ===
- Cool Struttin' (Planet Earth Recordings, 1994)

=== Shawn Lee's Ping Pong Orchestra ===
==== Albums ====
- Music and Rhythm (Ubiquity, 2004)
- Moods and Grooves (Ubiquity, 2005)
- Strings and Things (Ubiquity, 2006)
- Voices and Choices (Ubiquity, 2007)
- A Very Ping Pong Christmas: Funky Treats From Santa's Bag (Ubiquity, 2007)
- Hits the Hits (Ubiquity, 2007)
- Miles of Styles (Ubiquity, 2008)
- Under the Sun (Ubiquity, 2008)
- Hooked Up Classics (Ubiquity, 2010)
- World of Funk (Ubiquity, 2011)
- Reel to Reel (Ubiquity, 2012)
- Techstar (Silver Fox Records, 2017)

==== Singles and EPs ====
- Kiss The Sky EP (VS Nino Moschella) (Ubiquity, 2006)
- Miles of Smiles (Ubiquity, 2008)
- Kiss The Sky (Ubiquity, 2020)
- Rocket Ship (Da Do Bap Music ASCAP, 2021)

==== Appearances ====
- Thievery Corporation – ESL Remixed : The 100th Release Of ESL Music (Tracks: "A Gentle Dissolve (Shawn Lee Ping Pong Orchestra Remix)") (Eighteenth Street Lounge Music, 2006)
- Dust Galaxy – Come Hear the Trumpets (Tracks: "Come Hear The Trumpets (Shawn Lee's Ping Pong Orchestra Indian Vibes Remix)") (Vivicolorsound, 2007)
- Jack Arel – Chappell Recorded Music Library Works > Originals & Remixes (Tracks: "Jungle Soul (PPO Version)") (Koka Media, 2007)
- Various Artists – Cinematic: Classic Film Music Remixed (Tracks: "Birdman of Alcatraz (Shawn Lee's Ping Pong Orchestra Remix)") (Six Degrees Records, 2007)
- Unknown Artist – Vol. 2: Zouche Sounds (Tracks: "Rising Light (Shawn Lee & The Ping Pong Orchestra Remix)") (Universal Publishing Production Musics, 2008)

=== Shawn Lee's Incredible Tabla Band ===
==== Albums ====
- Tabla Rock (Ubiquity, 2011)

==== Singles and EPs ====
- Apache b/w Bongo Rock '73 (Ubiquity, 2019)

=== Shawn Lee & Clutchy Hopkins ===
- Clutch of the Tiger (Ubiquity, 2008)
- Fascinating Fingers (Ubiquity, 2009)

=== Bei Bei & Shawn Lee ===
==== Albums ====
- Into The Wind (Ubiquity, 2010)
- Year of the Funky (Légère Recordings, 2017)

==== Singles and EPs ====
- Beauty and the Beats (Ubiquity, 2009)
- Year of the Funky (Légère Recordings, 2017)

=== Lord Newborn and The Magic Skulls ===
- Lord Newborn and The Magic Skulls (Ubiquity, 2009)

=== AM & Shawn Lee ===
==== Albums ====
- Celestial Electric (ESL Music, 2011)
- Promises Are Never Far From Lies Remix EP (ESL Music, 2011)
- Somebody Like You (The Remixes) (ESL Music, 2012)
- Remixed Vol. 2 (ESL Music, 2012)
- La Musique Numérique (Park the Van, 2013)
- Replayed Remix Album (Park the Van, 2013)
- Instrumentally AM & Shawn Lee Vol. 1 (AM Sounds, 2013)
- Instrumentally AM & Shawn Lee Vol. 2 (AM Sounds, 2013)
- Outlines (AM Sounds, 2015)

==== Singles and EPs ====
- Dark Into Light (ESL, 2011)
- Automatic (Park the Van, 2013)
- You Are in My System (AM Sounds, 2015)
- Ocean (AM Sounds, 2015)

==== Mixtapes ====
- Paris DJs Betamix (Paris DJs, 2011)
- AM & Shawn Lee Mixtapes (AM Sounds, 2014)

=== Tim Love Lee / Shawn Lee ===
- New York Trouble / Electric Progression (Tummy Touch Records, 2013)

=== Electric Peanut Butter Company ===
- Trans-Atlantic Pysch Classics Vol. 2 (Ubiquity, 2013)
- Trans-Atlantic Psych Classics Vol. 1 (Ubiquity, 2014)

=== Young Gun Silver Fox (w/ Andy Platts) ===
==== Albums ====
- West End Coast (Légère Recordings, 2015)
- AM Waves (Légère Recordings, 2018)
- Canyons (Légère Recordings, 2020)
- Ticket to Shangri-La (Légère Recordings, 2022)
- Pleasure (Légère Recordings/Candelion, 2025)

==== Singles and EPs ====
- Tip of the Flame (12" Disco Mix) (Légère Recordings, 2023)
- Moonshine - Single (Légère Recordings, 2023)

=== Shawn Lee and The Soul Surfers ===
- Shawn Lee and The Soul Surfers (Silver Fox Records, 2018)

=== Shawn Lee & Paul Elliott ===
==== Singles & EPs ====
- Mexican Marimba (Légère Recordings, 2019)
- Bass Sick Bitch / Honey Roast Nuts (Farfalla Records, 2022)

=== Misha Panfilov & Shawn Lee ===
==== Albums ====
- Paradise Cove (Fnr, 2020)
- Space & Tempo (Fnr, 2022)

==== Singles and EPs ====
- Mic Wallace / Miraggio (Fnr, 2019)

=== The Shawn Lee Rides Again Band ===
==== Singles and EPs ====
- Wichita Lineman (Yeah! Yeah! Yeah! Sessions) (Légère Recordings, 2020)

=== Shawn Lee's Incredible Leg Warmer Band ===
- The 37-Minute Workout (Légère Recordings, 2020)

=== Oregano ===
==== Singles and EPs ====
- Melting Sand/Transmitter (Delights, 2021)

=== The Superhighway Band ===
==== Albums ====
- Studio City (Légère Recordings, 2021)

==== Singles & EPs ====
- Catalina (Légère Recordings, 2022)

=== Shawn Lee & The Angels of Libra ===
==== Singles and EPs ====
- Bless My Soul (Légère Recordings, 2022)

=== David Fostex ===
==== Singles & EPs ====
- Taste the Biscuit (David Fostex Cover) (None, 2022)

=== Video game soundtracks ===
- The Getaway (2002)
- Bully (2006)
- Zombie Playground (2013)

=== Film soundtracks ===
- Under the Sun (2008)
- Elevate
- Save Angel Hope
- FLYING BOAT (2023)
