= Metal Machine Trio =

American musical band

- Genres: Noise; ambient; free jazz; electronica; drone; experimental rock
- Years active: 2008–2013
- Labels: Best Seat in the House
- Past members: Lou Reed; Ulrich Krieger; Sarth Calhoun

Metal Machine Trio was an American musical group founded in 2008 by Lou Reed, Ulrich Krieger and Sarth Calhoun. The group played instrumental and free improvised music, touching on various genres from free rock, free jazz, minimal music, noise music, electronica, to ambient music. The group rehearsed to test ideas, but all performances were improvised.

== History ==
The name of the group refers to Reed's unconventional 1975 noise album Metal Machine Music. The soundscapes of this dense, abstract, controversial album serve as a reference point for Metal Machine Trio's improvisations. The noisy, abstract music of the trio counteracts the expectations of Reed's regular audience for song-based rock music. The official flyer for the New York Blender Theatre stated: “No songs. No vocals.” MM3's music has an eclectic approach to improvisation including ambient drones, electronic sounds, noise music, aggressive free playing, heavy distortion on guitar and saxophone, extended feedback passages, raga-like drones, for which the Velvet Underground were famous, and occasional rhythm and blues and heavy metal reminiscence.

With MM3 Reed continued to cultivate his avant-garde side in a group setting. Other avant-garde outputs he ventured into since the 2000s included his improvisational meetings with John Zorn, who was surprise guest artist at the second night at Blender Theater, Laurie Anderson in their duo‚ Yellow Pony, and his electronic ambient drone release Hudson River Wind Meditations.

The media reception of MM3 generally considered Reed tapping into a different part of his creative energy again, that for many years only held a place at the fringe of his rock output, reclaiming a part of his "musical legacy that has been neglected for too long".

Reed found musical partners in Ulrich Krieger on electric saxophone and Sarth Calhoun on various electronics. Krieger, professor for composition and experimental sound practices at the California Institute of the Arts, had experience as a performer of contemporary composed music, free improvisation, experimental rock and noise. Beside writing original electronic and chamber music, he had arranged Metal Machine Music for classical chamber ensemble in 2002. Sarth Calhoun produces electronic soundscapes and processes his fellow performers in real time. He uses the electronic controller Continuum Fingerboard and the Kyma Workstation. He is member of the band Lucibel Crater.

The group premiered at REDCAT, part of the Disney Concert Hall Complex in downtown Los Angeles, California, on October 2 and 3, 2008, under the title "Unclassified: Lou Reed and Ulrich Krieger". A live double CD of these shows, entitled The Creation of the Universe, was released December 22, 2008 on Reed's own label Best Seat in the House. The group played further shows at the New York Blender Theater at Gramercy on April 23 and 24, 2009.

The group is now inactive following the death of Lou Reed on October 27, 2013.

== Band members ==
- Lou Reed – guitar, electronics
- Ulrich Krieger – tenor saxophone, live electronics
- Sarth Calhoun – fingerboard continuum, live processing
