= Leah Coloff =

American singer-songwriter, and cellist

- Genres: Classical, electronic, experimental
- Instruments: Cello, voice
- Years active: 1999–present
- Label: Searching Eye Records
- Website: leahcoloff.com

Leah Coloff is an American singer-songwriter, and cellist who lives in Brooklyn, New York City, United States.

== Biography ==
Leah Coloff started cello lessons at the age of six. She attended the New England Conservatory. However, she became disillusioned, finding "the recital halls stuffed with haughty academics and enema-lovin' white people...", and found herself drawn to more raucous, darker music, and moved to Brooklyn, New York upon graduating.

In 1999 she produced her debut rock album, Dark Sweet Heart under Searching Eye Records. It was recorded at Fireproof Recording in Brooklyn by Adam Lasus. It features her with Ben Shapiro on guitar and Rich Kulsar on drums accompanying her.

Also in 1999, she joined the band Number19 with Sarth Calhoun, Tony Diodore, and Marcus Righter. The band mixed and looped her cello and vocals with electronic music in an alternative and indie rock setting. The band notably funded its first album, Suspension, from mp3.com downloads. At one point the band was ranked No. 18 overall on the mp3.com, and garnered over 90,000 downloads in 6 months.

In 2005 Coloff, along with Calhoun (keys, bass, loops, sound design, continuum fingerboard), formed the band Lucibel Crater with Paul Chuffo (drums, thumb piano, sound). Lucibel Crater released an EP, Miracles, in 2007, and their only full-length album, The Family Album, in 2008. Lou Reed collaborated with Coloff on The Family Album. Coloff, the lead songwriter of the album, explores the theme of American live as imagined as historical photographs.

In addition to Lucibel Crater, Coloff released a graphic album (gralbum) featuring her music in 2014 through Sarth Calhoun's publishing company, The Gralbum Collective. Coloff also collaborates with a large number of artists and groups, including Iggy Pop, Nancy Sinatra, Damon Albarn, and many others.
