= Darondo =

- Also known as: Double D Dynamite D
- Born: William Daron Pulliam; October 5, 1946; Berkeley, California, U.S.
- Died: June 9, 2013 (aged 66) Sacramento, California, U.S.
- Genres: Soul; funk
- Occupations: Singer-songwriter, musician
- Labels: Music City; Ubiquity; Omnivore

William Daron Pulliam (October 5, 1946 – June 9, 2013), who performed in the 1970s under the name Darondo, was an American soul singer from the San Francisco Bay Area.

== Life and career ==
Darondo was born in 1946 in Berkeley, California. As a child, Darondo began enjoying rhythm and blues after his mother purchased him a guitar.

At the beginning of his career, Darondo met jazz pianist Al Tanner, who suggested the singer record something in the studio. That suggestion resulted in the single "I Want Your Love So Bad", which got Darondo noticed by Ray Dobard, the owner of record label Music City. Darondo collaborated with Tanner on songs at Dobard's studio, releasing three records from 1972 to 1974. One particular single, "Didn't I", ended up selling 35,000 copies and was played extensively on local radio.

During this period, Darondo got the opportunity to be the opening act for James Brown at Bimbo's 365 Club in the early 1970s. The singer also developed a unique sense of style, dressing in a white fur coat with snakeskin shoes and driving a white Rolls-Royce Silver Cloud with a "DARONDO" vanity plate. It was speculated that Darondo was a pimp, though he denied this claim. According to Darondo, his stage name originated as a compliment from a waitress who was fond of his generous tipping habits.

Towards the late 1970s, Darondo stepped away from music, partially due to being engaged in a financial dispute with Dobard and Music City. During this time, and lasting into the 1980s, Darondo hosted several shows on local cable television. These programs ranged from Darondo's Penthouse After Dark, to children's show Tapper the Rabbit. However, realizing that he needed time away from other people to stop his self-admitted cocaine dependence, Darondo made the decision to leave for Europe. After spending time in London and Paris, he accepted a job playing guitar on a cruise ship, which enabled him to visit other locales like Trinidad. Darondo eventually made his way back to the San Francisco Bay Area, becoming a physical therapist and a speech pathologist.

Despite being out of the music industry for decades, Darondo received renewed attention in recent years thanks to London disc jockey Gilles Peterson. Peterson played his 1973 single, "Didn't I" on his BBC Radio 1 program, and included the song on a 2005 compilation album called Gilles Peterson Digs America.

Recordings of Darondo are available from Luv N Haight, an imprint label of Ubiquity Records.

== In popular culture ==
=== "Didn't I" ===
==== Music and compilations ====
- Covered by Jack Peñate on his Spit at Stars EP (2007).
- Included on a Late Night Tales compilation mixed by Bonobo (2013).
- Covered by HONNE on their EP Coastal Love (2015).
- Sampled by producer Harry Fraud for his single “The Count,” featuring Wiz Khalifa and Currensy (2018).

==== Television ====
- Featured in an episode of Breaking Bad (2008).
- Used as the ending theme in an episode of Lovesick (2013).
- Featured in the premiere episode of The Blacklist and in season one of HBO's The Deuce (2017).
- Featured in the Hulu series High Fidelity (2020).
- Closed the fourth episode of the Scottish television drama Guilt, produced by the BBC and aired on Masterpiece Mystery, and the tenth episode of the second season of the FXX comedy series Dave (2021).
- Used in Episode 5 of Fight Night: The Million Dollar Heist (2024).
- Used in Episode 6 of Ironheart (2025).

==== Film and video ====
- Featured in the films Saint John of Las Vegas, Night Catches Us, and Jack Goes Boating (2010).
- Featured in the film Chinese Puzzle, the third installment of the Spanish Apartment trilogy, starring Romain Duris (2013).
- Appeared in the New Element video Future Nature (2010).

=== Other songs ===
- "Legs" was featured in an episode of the American version of Life on Mars (2009).
- "I'm Lonely" was featured in an episode in season two of P-Valley (2022).

== Personal life ==
In the 1980s, Darondo met his wife, Prem, in Fiji. He has two daughters, Isis and Angel. They all live in Sacramento, California.

Darondo died of heart failure in 2013 at the age of 66.

== Discography ==
- Let My People Go, Ubiquity Records, 2006
- Listen to My Song, the Music City Sessions, Omnivore Recordings, 2011
