= Ubiquity Records =

American record label

- Founded: 1990
- Founder: Michael McFadin
- Genre: Various
- Country of origin: U.S.
- Location: San Francisco (1990–2001); Costa Mesa (2001–)
- Official website: ubiquityrecords.bandcamp.com

Ubiquity Records is an American independent record label that focuses on multiple genres, including but not limited to hip hop, electronic, funk, Latin, soul, jazz, singer-songwriter, and other genres.

== History ==
Ubiquity Records was founded in 1990 by Michael and Jody McFadin out of the Groove Merchant record store on the Lower Haight of San Francisco, California. Following the success of the Groove Merchant the Luv N' Haight record label (named after the Sly and The Family Stone song) was launched and in 1993 the company was incorporated as Ubiquity Recordings.

It is located in Costa Mesa, California, with a satellite office in San Francisco. Ubiquity has two imprint labels, Luv N' Haight (specializing in Rare groove) and Cubop Records (specializing in Latin jazz and salsa). Including all three imprints, the label has released over 350 albums, covering genres from reggae to Latin jazz.

== Artists ==
Ubiquity

- Babatunde Lea
- Beatless
- Blank Blue
- Breakestra
- Bugs
- Clutchy Hopkins
- Connie Price and the Keystones
- Darondo
- DJ Greyboy
- DJ Nobody
- Eddie Harris
- Eric Lau
- James Taylor Quartet
- Jeremy Ellis
- Jimi Tenor
- Kirk Degiorgio (As One)
- Mistura Pura
- Nomo
- Ohmega Watts
- Orgone
- Platinum Pied Pipers
- Puracane
- Roy Davis Jr.
- Sa-Ra Creative Partners
- Shawn Lee
- The Lions
- Theo Parrish

Cubop

- Francisco Aguabella
- Jack Costanzo
- Bobby Matos
- Dave Pike
- Arturo Sandoval
- Snowboy

Luv N' Haight

- Gloria Ann Taylor
- Weldon Irvine
- RAMP
- Darondo
- Mike James Kirkland
