= Joe Ciardiello =

American illustrator

- Born: 1953 (age 71–72); Staten Island, New York
- Education: BFA, Parsons School of Design; New School
- Known for: illustration
- Awards: Hamilton King Award, 2016; 4 Silver Medals, Society of Illustrators

Joe Ciardiello (born 1953) is an American illustrator. He works primarily in pen and ink on water color paper and is best known for his work as a portrait artist, for clients such as American Express, Barnes & Noble.com, Capitol Records, The Folio Society, The New Yorker, The New York Times Book Review, The Rock and Roll Hall of Fame, Rolling Stone, Smithsonian and Time. He has received awards from the Society of Illustrators.

== Early life and education ==
Ciardiello was born in 1953 in Staten Island, New York. His grandparents were Italian immigrants who settled on the Island and his parents were born there as well. His father, Joseph A. Ciardiello was the youngest of four boys. He operated a dental practice in Staten Island, but also had a lifelong interest in drawing.

Ciardiello attended a Catholic grammar school and was accepted into the High School of Art and Design. When Ciardiello was a senior in high school, he was setting his sights on becoming a cartoonist, until Murray Tinkelman came to the school as a guest lecturer. After hearing his lecture and looking at his drawings, Ciardiello decided that Tinkelman's approach as an illustrator offered more possibilities for him than cartooning. When he enrolled in the Parsons School of Design, it was as an illustration major. At Parsons he met his second important influence on his work, his figure drawing instructor, Jim Spanfeller through whom he learned a love of drawing in an expressive way. Other instructors at Parsons included Bernie D'Andrea, Lorraine Fox and Maurice Sendak. Ciardiello graduated from Parson in 1974 and received his BFA in 1975.

=== Artistic influences ===
Apart from Tinkelman and Spanfeller, Ciardiello's early artistic influences came primarily from illustrators who were working at the time, such as Alan Cober and Leonard Baskin. Ciardiello also drew inspiration from the work of Egon Schiele, who was an early 20th century Austrian artist.

== Illustration career ==
=== Getting started ===
Ciardiello's work first appeared in print in 1974 during his senior year in college, in Crawdaddy Magazine, whose offices were a few blocks from Parsons and which Rolling Stone credited with being the first serious journal dedicated to rock and roll. The illustration was a black and white depiction of Lenny Bruce. Another early client who published Ciardiello was Penthouse Magazine. Scholastic Magazines was also an early client for the young artist. His first piece accepted into the Society of Illustrators Annual Exhibition was in 1975.

=== Professional life ===
In the late 1980s, Ciardiello began work on a series of black and white drawings of his favorite jazz musicians, such as Charlie Parker, Miles Davis, Charles Mingus, Thelonious Monk and others. The drawings were compiled into a book, with poems by John Kruth, and art directed by Patrick Flynn. The book, titled Like Jazz was published in 1992.

After the publication of Like Jazz, Ciardiello began illustrating for the Capitol Blues Collection for Capitol Records, which lead to 23 illustrated volumes, including the first in the series T-BONE WALKER The Complete Capitol / Black & White Recordings (1995) and the last in that series, CAPITOL BLUES #23: VARIOUS ARTISTS Chicago Blues Masters Volume Three (1997).

In 1999, Ciardiello had a one-man exhibition of his works Portraits of Blues and Other Images at the Museum of American Illustration, which is housed by the Society of Illustrators, New York City.

In 2016, Ciardiello won the Hamilton King Award, which is the highest award the Society of Illustrators can bestow to a member. The award was presented on behalf of Ciardiello's work illustrating the book On The Snap by Brian Case.

In 2019, Fantagraphics published Ciardiello's A Fistful of Drawings, a collection produced over the previous five years inspired by Westerns.

== Working process ==
When doing portraiture Ciardiello will gather as many photographs of his subject as possible. After this, he either draws sketches on tracing paper, which he places on a light box where the drawing is transferred to paper; alternately he will frequently go directly to a finished drawing in pen and ink, without preliminary sketches. Ciardiello primarily works with a Rapidograph pen, and occasionally a dip pen, on watercolor paper.

== Personal life ==
Ciardiello lives in New Jersey with his wife artist Susan Blubaugh. He contributes original works for auction to support charities including the Drawing Dreams Foundation, The Printing Center of New Jersey and veterans charities.

Ciardiello plays drums with the bands Kane Trio and The Half-Tones. The Half-Tones is an all-illustrator band consisting of Barry Blitt, Richard A. Goldberg, Hal Mayforth, Robert Saunders, Michael Sloan, and James Steinberg.

== Selected illustrations ==
- The Long, Strange Trip of Dock Ellis, ESPN
- Reimagining the California Condor, Audubon Magazine
- Portrait of David Hockney, SIC Magazine (Silver Medal Society of Illustrators)
- Rock and Roll Hall of Fame 24th Annual Induction (program cover)
- Portrait of Eric Clapton, Playboy Japan

== Book illustration ==
- Brief Lives by John Aubrey, The Folio Society
- Like Jazz The Spanfeller Press, 1992
- 10 Rules of Writing by Elmore Leonard, William Morrow 2007
- The Devil's Sinkhole by Bill Wittliff, University of Texas Press, 2016
- Black White & Blues, by Joe Ciardiello, Strike Three Press 2011
- On The Snap by Brian Case, Caught by the River Press, 2015

Putnam Editions

- Theodore Roosevelt by Sibyl Hancock, 1978
- The Great Houdini by Anne Edwards, 1977
- Buffalo Bill by Eden Vale Stevens, 1976

Franklin Library Editions

These books, re-published from the original texts, were illustrated by Ciardiello:

- The Magic Mountain by Thomas Mann, 1979
- Bellefleur by Joyce Carol Oates, 1980
- Nostromo: a tale of the seaboard by Joseph Conrad, 1981

World's Best Reading Series, Reader's Digest, 1990-1999

These books, re-published from the original texts, were illustrated by Ciardiello and distributed by the publisher to a mail order book club:

- A Connecticut Yankee in King Arthur's Court, Mark Twain, 1984
- Around the World in 80 Days, Jules Verne, 1988
- Moby Dick by Herman Melville, 1989
- Twenty Thousand Leagues Under the Seas, Jules Verne, 1990
- The Strange Case of Dr. Jekyll and Mr. Hyde, Robert Louis Stevenson. 1992
- The Celebrated Jumping Frog and Other Stories, Mark Twain, 1992
- Heart of the West, O. Henry, 1993
- Bellefleur, Joyce Carol Oates

== Bibliography ==
- A Fistful of Drawings, 2019

== Compilations and annuals ==
Ciardiello has been represented in many books and art annuals, including:

- The Illustrator in America, 1860-2000, Society of Illustrators, 2001, by Walt Reed
- 100 Illustrators, Taschen 2013, edited by Steven Heller
- Illustrations Now edited by Julius Wiedemann, Taschen 2005

== Awards and honors ==
- Hamilton King Award, Society of Illustrators, 2016
- Silver Medal, Society of Illustrators, 1993
- Silver Medal, Society of Illustrators, 2000, for portrait of William Burroughs
- Silver Medal, Society of Illustrators, 2006
- Merit Award, Society of Publication Designers, 2008 (with Jonny Hannah)
- Silver Medal, Society of Illustrators, 2012 for portrait of David Hockney
- Excellence for Book Series for 'Black White & Blues', Communication Arts 2012
- Stevan Dohanos Award, Members Open
- Best Illustration, Nevada Press Association, 2010
- 2014 Excellence in Journalism, Milwaukee Press Club, 2014
- Bronze Medal, 3X3 ProShow, 2012
