= Fred D. Thompson (businessman) =

American publishing executive

- Born: Frederick Delos Thompson Jr. 1915; San Antonio, Texas, United States
- Died: September 17, 1988 (aged 72–73); Fort William, Highland, United States
- Education: Columbia University (BA)
- Occupation: Publishing executive
- Known for: President of Family Circle

Frederick Delos Thompson Jr. (1915 – September 17, 1988) was an American publishing executive. He was a former president and chief executive of Family Circle and a former vice president of The New York Times.

== Biography ==
Thompson was born in 1915 in San Antonio, Texas. His family moved to New York City when he was 14. He attended the Lincoln School and spent his freshman at the American University of Beirut. He received his bachelor's degree from Columbia University in 1937.

After graduation, Thompson toured Europe and the Middle East, using money he had raised by selling subscriptions to the Reader's Digest, and began his career at the magazine. He helped establish the magazine's first international division in Latin America, and directed the distribution of the magazine's military edition across Europe and Asia Pacific. In 1947, he founded the Reader's Digest branch of Canada. In 1954, he was named director of national advertising and subsequently served as worldwide advertising director.

Thompson was named vice president of The New York Times in 1971. He was also president and chief executive of the Family Circle magazine from 1969 to 1975 until he was named The Times' s vice president for advertising. He was named head of the Times's magazine group after the newspaper acquired Family Circle. He was named assistant to Walter E. Mattson in 1979 and served in that position until 1980.

== Personal life and family ==
In 1938, Thompson married Julia Louise Acheson, daughter of Barclay Acheson, a former executive secretary of the Near East Foundation and chairman of the Reader's Digest International Edition. Acheson was the niece of Reader's Digest founders Lila Acheson Wallace and DeWitt Wallace.

Thompson died on September 17, 1988, while vacationing in Fort William, Highland. His children included Geoffrey A. Thompson, former CEO of Marine Midland Bank and director of HSBC Bank USA.
