= David Hofstra =

American bassist (born 1953)

- At Pianos in NYC in 2026 with Bootstrappers

Background information
- Born: May 21, 1953 (age 73)
- Origin: Leavenworth, Kansas, U.S.
- Genres: New wave, jazz
- Instruments: Bass, tuba

David Carl "Dave" Hofstra (born May 21, 1953, Leavenworth, Kansas) is an American jazz double-bassist. He also plays bass guitar and tuba.

Hofstra was an autodidact on bass. He worked with Robin Holcomb, John Zorn, Joel Forrester, and Dave Sewelson in the late 1970s. In 1980 and 1981, he was a founding member of The Waitresses, a new wave band based in Akron, Ohio, and played on their 1982 studio album, Wasn't Tomorrow Wonderful?. He was active primarily in New York from the 1980s, playing with William Parker, Lou Grassi, Denis Charles, Elliott Sharp, Paul Shapiro, Bobby Previte, Wayne Horvitz, Saheb Sarbib, Bobby Radcliff, Jemeel Moondoc, Marie McAuliffe, Bill Frisell, Robin Eubanks, Greg Osby, David Rosenbloom, Phillip Johnston, Chris Kelsey, Rachelle Garniez, Clare Daly, William Gagliardi, and Robin Holcomb. He is also a founding member of The Microscopic Septet, and has played on every one of their eight albums.
