= NVC =

NVC may refer to:

== Places in the United States ==
- National Visa Center, Portsmouth, New Hampshire
- Northwest Vista College, San Antonio, Texas

== Science ==
- National Vegetation Classification, two habitat taxonomies:
  - British National Vegetation Classification
  - U.S. National Vegetation Classification
- Nonverbal communication
- Nonviolent Communication, a technique in psychology
- Nitrogen-vacancy center, point defects in diamond

== Other uses ==
- NVC International, a Hong-Kong–based lighting manufacturer
- National Vocabulary Championship, an American children's competition
- New vogue children, a 2003 album by Japanese electronica duo Schwarz Stein
- Nissan Vanette Cargo, a vehicle model (made in 1960s and 1970s)
