= Claire Daly =

American saxophonist (1958–2024)

- Born: February 26, 1958; Bronxville, New York, U.S.
- Died: October 22, 2024 (aged 66) Longmont, Colorado, U.S.
- Genres: Jazz
- Instruments: Baritone saxophone
- Years active: 1985–2023

Claire Anne Daly (February 26, 1958 – October 22, 2024) was an American baritone saxophonist and composer.

== Early life ==
Daly was born in Bronxville, New York on February 26, 1958, and grew up in Scarsdale, New York. She began playing the saxophone at the age of 12, becoming interested in jazz when she attended a Buddy Rich performance at the Westchester County Center. She attended Berklee College of Music, mainly playing alto and tenor saxophones, and graduated in 1980.

== Career ==
After graduating, Daly played alto and tenor saxophone in two rock bands while performing jazz in the Boston area. She moved to New York City in 1985 and began her career as a freelance baritone saxophonist. Beginning in the mid-1990s, she performed frequently with pianist Joel Forrester and together they released six albums.

Daly's first album as a leader, Swing Low, was released in 1999. It was later installed in the Clinton Presidential Center, as an album that was significant to President Bill Clinton.

As the original baritonist with the DIVA Jazz Orchestra she toured for seven years. In 2000 she performed at the Mary Lou Williams Women in Jazz Festival with her quartet. The next year she was guest soloist with the Billy Taylor Trio at the Kennedy Center. She released, Heaven Help Us All (on her own label, Daly Bread Records), in 2004, as bandleader.

Her 2008 self-released album Rah! Rah!, a tribute to Rahsaan Roland Kirk, was re-issued by Ride Symbol in 2020. In 2009, she began co-leading Two Sisters, Inc, featuring baritone saxophonist Dave Sewelson and bassist David Hofstra, and recorded the album Scaribari. Her Mary Joyce Project, Nothing to Lose, was dedicated to her second cousin who was the first non Alaskan to travel 1,000 miles, solo, by dogsled from Juneau to Fairbanks (1935). It premiered in Juneau at the "Jazz and Classics" Festival in May, 2011. In 2012, her album Baritone Monk, produced by Doug Moody. of the North Coast Brewing Co., hit number one on the CMJ Jazz Charts. Her 2016 album, 2648 West Grand Boulevard, featured jazz versions of Motown tunes from the Detroit years. It was on the Glass Beach Jazz label, also produced by Doug Moody.

Daly was a three-time winner of the Jazz Journalists Association's "Baritone Sax of the Year" Award and a multiple time winner of both the JazzTimes and Downbeat Critic and Readers Polls for "Baritone Saxophonist of the Year".

She performed as a leader with her band at the Monterey, Healdsburg, Litchfield and Perth International jazz festivals, the Kennedy Center, Dizzy's Club at Lincoln Center and many more venues. She has written feature articles in jazz magazines as well as liner notes. She backed up Aretha Franklin, James Brown, Joe Williams, Rosemary Clooney, Taj Mahal and Robert Palmer, among others.

A veteran Litchfield Jazz Camp teaching artist (20 years), Daly was head of the Litchfield in New York combos, and a teacher at Jazz at Lincoln Center MSJA. She continued to offer clinics and teach privately and at jazz camps. She taught at MIT, UMASS Amherst; Valparaiso University, Indiana; Hall High School in Hartford, Connecticut; College of St. Rose in Albany, New York; Chamber Street Music School in Manhattan, New York; Hoff Barthelson Music School, Scarsdale, New York; Towson University; and Syracuse University. She gave lessons from a studio in Chelsea, Manhattan.

== Death ==
Daly was diagnosed with head and neck cancer in 2023. She died at the residence of a friend in Longmont, Colorado, on October 22, 2024, at the age of 66.

== Playing and composing style ==
A DownBeat reviewer in 2011 wrote that Daly's "saxophone work and hard-bop-tinged, conversational compositions recall Dexter Gordon or Vince Guaraldi". The Director of the MIT Festival Jazz Ensemble commented that "Claire Daly is a first-rate musician and educator who brings her soulfulness and thoughtfulness to all that she does. Super insightful, open, warm; she is the kind of guest artist who leaves something behind for everyone to think about and work on".

== Discography ==
=== As leader ===
- Swing Low (Koch, 1999)
- Movin' On (Koch, 2002)
- Heaven Help Us All (Daly Bread, 2004)
- Baritone Monk (NCBC Music, 2012)
- 2648 West Grand Boulevard (Glass Beach, 2016)
- Rah! Rah! (Ride Symbol, 2020)
- VuVu for Frances (2023)

=== As guest ===
- Joe Fonda, Loaded Basses (CIMP, 2006)
- Joel Forrester, In Heaven (Koch, 1997)
- George Garzone, Moodiology (NYC, 1999)
- Giacomo Gates, The Revolution Will Be Jazz (Savant, 2011)
- J. C. Hopkins, Underneath a Brooklyn Moon (Tigerlily, 2005)
- J. C. Hopkins, Meet Me at Minton's (Harlem Jazz, 2016)
- Matt Lavelle, The Crop Circles Suite Part one (Mahakala, 2024)
- Matt Lavelle, Harmolodic Duke (Unseen Rain, 2023)
- Matt Lavelle, The House Keeper (Unseen Rain, 2023)
- Warren Smith, Old News Borrowed (Blues Engine, 2009)
- Taj Mahal, Like Never Before (Private Music, 1991)
- Tribecastan, New Deli (Evergreene Music, 2012)
- E.J. Decker, A Job of Work (Candela, 2013)
- E.J. Decker, Bluer Than Velvet (Candela, 2018)
