= TFTC =

TFTC may refer to:

- "Thanks For The Cache", a phrase commonly used in geocaching
- "Thanks For The Chapter", a phrase commonly used on on-line fiction sites
- Tales from the Crypt (disambiguation), a horror franchise originally published by EC Comics during the 1950s
- Truth for the Commoner, a media company focused on Bitcoin and political commentary
