= Jason Buhrmester =

American journalist

Jason Buhrmester is an American journalist, author and the Chief Content Officer at Reader's Digest.

== Career ==
In 2017 Buhrmester was Editorial Director of Playboy magazine where he oversaw the magazine's 2016 relaunch. Previously, he has written for Playboy, Maxim, Spin, The Village Voice, Wired, and others.

== Works ==
Black Dogs: The Possibly True Story of Classic Rock's Greatest Robbery was published by Three Rivers Press in April 2009. The book is the fictional story of four Baltimore teens who rob Led Zeppelin in 1973.
