= DeWitt Wallace =

American magazine publisher

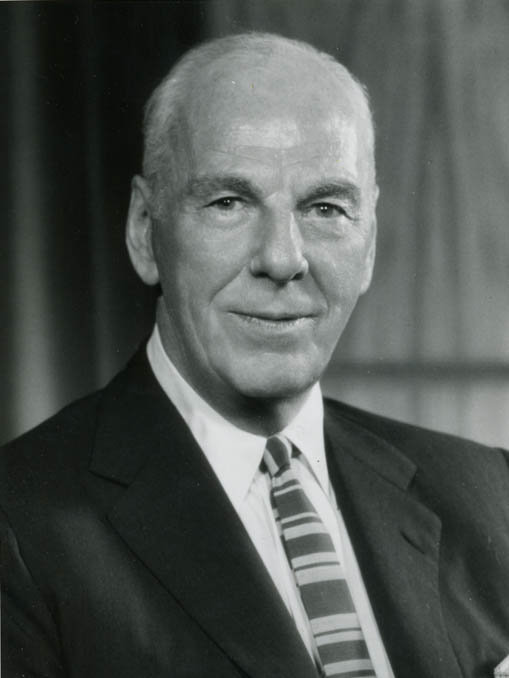
- Born: William Roy Dewitt Wallace; November 12, 1889; Saint Paul, Minnesota, U.S.
- Died: March 30, 1981 (aged 91); Mount Kisco, New York, U.S.
- Education: Macalester College; University of California, Berkeley
- Occupation: Publisher
- Known for: Co-founder of Reader's Digest
- Spouse: Lila Bell Wallace

William Roy DeWitt Wallace (/dəˈwɪt/ də-WIT; November 12, 1889 – March 30, 1981), publishing as DeWitt Wallace, was an American magazine publisher.

Wallace co-founded Reader's Digest with his wife Lila Bell Wallace, publishing the first issue in 1922.

== Early life and education ==
Wallace was born in Saint Paul, Minnesota, on November 12, 1889. His father was on the faculty (and later president) of Macalester College. He attended Mount Hermon School as a youth (now Northfield Mount Hermon School). Wallace attended college at Macalester from 1907 to 1909 and transferred to the University of California, Berkeley for two years.

== Career ==
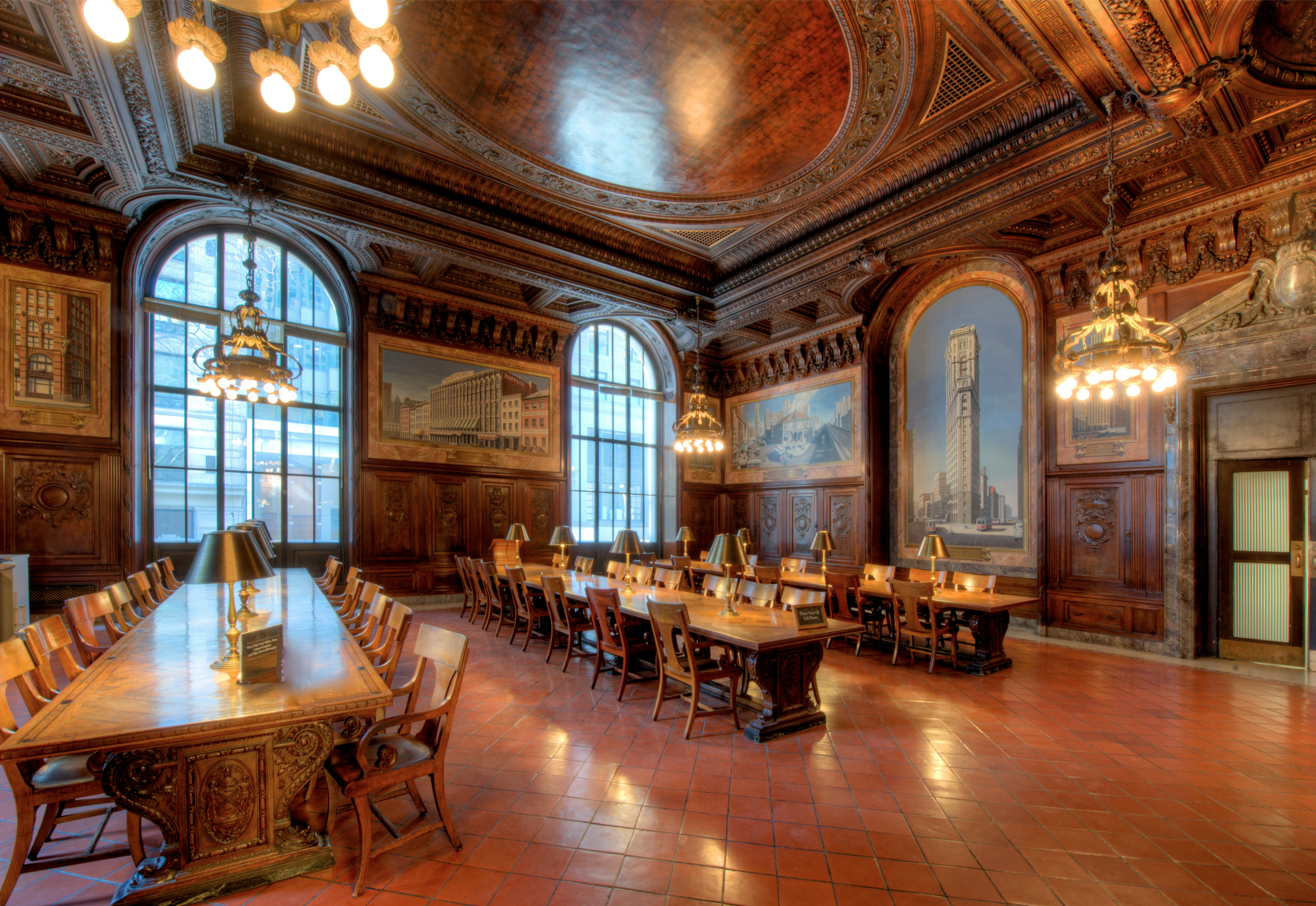
Room 108 of the New York Public Library, now known as the DeWitt Wallace Periodical Room, holds current unbound issues of 68 popular periodical titles and 22 domestic and foreign newspapers. In the 1920s DeWitt Wallace spent countless hours in this room, reading and condensing articles from the Library's collection. In 1983, the room's restoration was made possible by a gift from the Wallace Fund, established by DeWitt Wallace.

In 1912, Wallace returned to St. Paul, where he was hired by a publishing firm specializing in farming literature.

During World War I, Wallace enlisted in the United States Army and was wounded. He spent four months in a French hospital recovering from his injuries, passing the time by reading American magazines.

Returning to the U.S., Wallace spent every day of the next six months at the Minneapolis Public Library researching and condensing magazine articles. He wanted to create a magazine with articles on a wide variety of subjects, abridged so that each could be easily read. Wallace showed his sample magazine to Lila Bell Acheson, sister of an old college friend, Barclay Acheson, who responded enthusiastically. He proposed to her and on October 15, 1921, they were married.

The Wallaces decided to publish the magazine themselves and market it by direct mail. The first issue appeared on February 5, 1922. Reader's Digest soon became one of the most widely circulated periodicals in the world. Wallace was a supporter of the Republican Party with strong anti-communist views, and the magazine reflected these beliefs.

Wallace and his wife were strong supporters of Richard Nixon's presidential bid in the 1968 presidential election, giving Nixon cash donations and allowing Nixon to write articles for the Digest.

Wallace was a noted philanthropist, donating much of his massive fortune to his alma mater Macalester College. The Wallaces also established a number of foundations that are now consolidated as The Wallace Foundation, which supports education, youth development and the arts. There is a dormitory with his name on the Northfield Mount Hermon campus. He funded the DeWitt Wallace Decorative Arts Museum, opened in 1985 at Colonial Williamsburg in Virginia.

== Awards ==
On January 28, 1972, DeWitt Wallace was presented with the Presidential Medal of Freedom by President Richard Nixon.

Wallace was inducted into the Junior Achievement U.S. Business Hall of Fame in 1980.

== Death ==
Wallace died at his home in Mount Kisco, New York, on March 30, 1981. He left no children with his wife Lila. His niece, Julia Acheson, was married to The New York Times executive Fred D. Thompson.

== Awards and honors ==
- Golden Plate Award of the American Academy of Achievement (1966)
- Presidential Medal of Freedom (1972)
- Junior Achievement U.S. Business Hall of Fame (1980)

== See also ==
- Glynwood Center
