= TriBeCaStan =

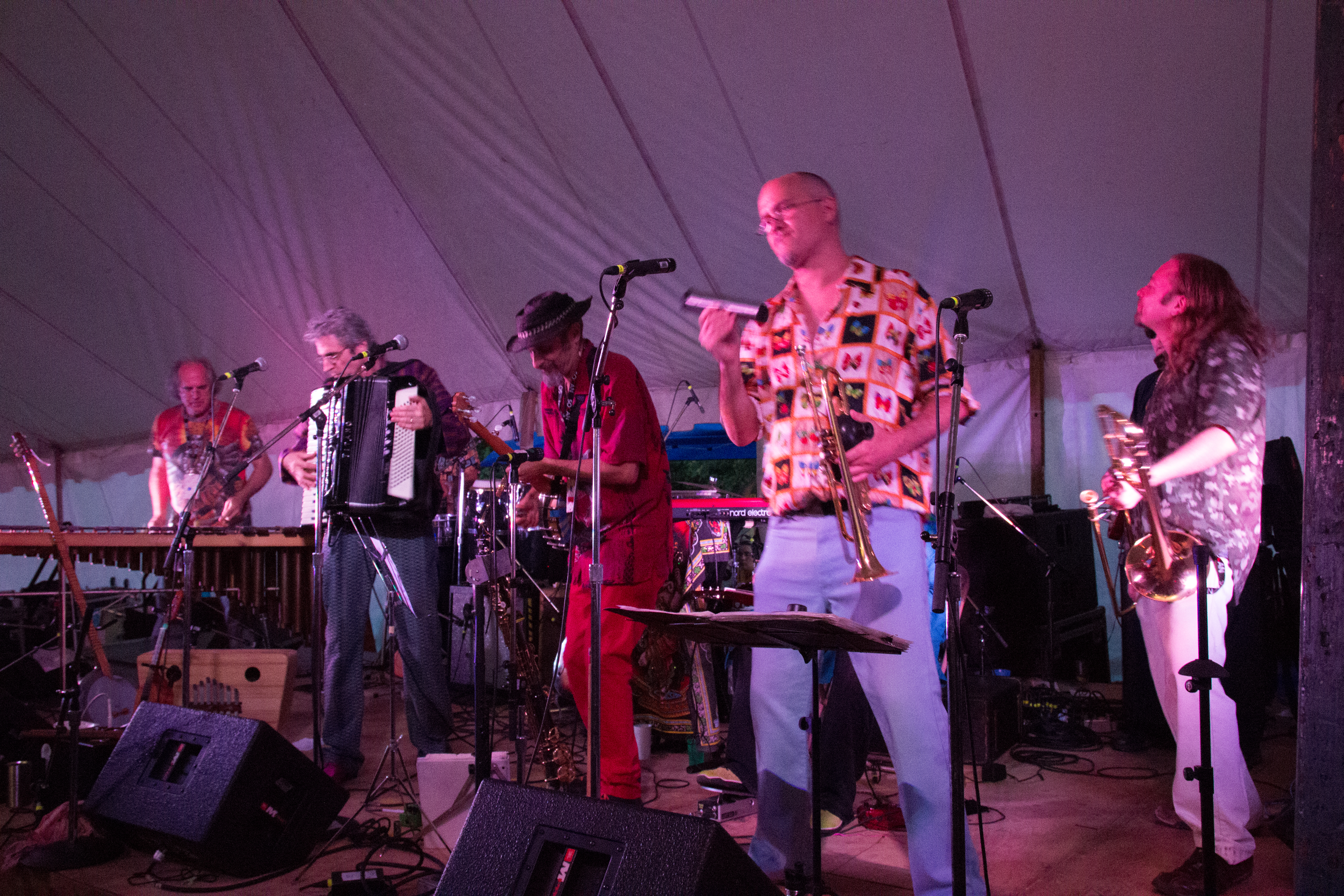
- The band TriBeCeStan performing at the 2015 Hillside Festival

Background information
- Origin: New York City
- Genre: World Music

TriBeCaStan is an American world music ensemble from New York, New York. The band was co-founded by multi-instrumentalists John Kruth (mandolin, banjo, sitar, flute, and harmonica) and Jeff Greene (marimba, yayli tambor, Jew's harp) and includes baritone sax player Claire Daly, percussionist Boris Kinberg and Kenny Margolis on accordion and keyboards (both formerly with Willy DeVille), Premik Russell Tubbs (Mahavishnu Orchestra, Carlos Santana, Sting) - alto saxophone, flute, clarinet and lap steel guitar, bassist Ray Peterson (Eddie Harris), trombonist Chris Morrow, John Turner on trumpet and drummer Kirk Driscoll. Referred to as 'genre-bending' by The New York Times and Alarm Magazine the band has been known to defy musical genre description, with several publications describing their music as fusing avant-garde jazz, klezmer, Balkan, Indian, Middle Eastern, Afghani folk, Afrofunk, Chinese traditional music, African, Latin jazz and surf rock and has been compared to the British world music band 3 Mustaphas 3 by All Music Guide. Other musicians who have been known to play with the band include tabla player Badal Roy (Miles Davis, John McLaughlin) Bachir Attar (of the Master Musicians of Jajouka) bassist Dave Dreiwitz of Ween, trombonist Steve Turre. guitarist Scott Metzger, . and Matt Darriau (alto saxophone, clarinet, kaval) of the Klezmatics.

== Discography ==
The cover for their album New Deli was created by Cal Schenkel.

Regarding the release of their album New Songs from the Old Country, journalist Richard Gehr called it "the fourth (and best) album by a band specializing in making old and foreign music new again."

Year	Album title	Label
2009	Strange Cousin	Evergreene
2010	5-Star Cave	Evergreene
2012	New Deli	Evergreene
2013, Oct 1	New Songs from the Old Country	Evergreene
2015, Oct 15	Goddess Polka Dottess	Evergreene
