= Tales from the Crypt =

Tales from the Crypt may refer to:

- Tales from the Crypt (album), by American rapper C-Bo
- Tales from the Crypt (comics), published by EC Comics during the 1950s
  - Tales from the Crypt (film), a 1972 Amicus film starring Ralph Richardson partially based on the comic book
  - The Vault of Horror, also known as Tales from the Crypt II, a 1973 sequel starring Terry-Thomas, Dawn Adams, Denholm Elliott, and Curt Jurgens also partially based on the comic book
  - Tales from the Crypt (TV series), a horror anthology series that ran from 1989 to 1996 based on the comic book
    - Tales from the Crypt (radio series), an American radio series spun off from the TV series
    - Demon Knight, also known as Tales from the Crypt Presents: Demon Knight, a 1995 film starring Billy Zane, William Sadler and Jada Pinkett Smith based on the television series
    - Bordello of Blood, also known as Tales from the Crypt Presents: Bordello of Blood, a 1996 film starring Dennis Miller, Erika Eleniak, Angie Everhart and Corey Feldman based on the television series
    - Ritual (2002 film), also known as Tales From the Crypt Presents: Ritual, a 2002 film starring Tim Curry, Jennifer Grey and Craig Sheffer

== See also ==
- List of Tales from the Crypt episodes
- Tales from the Crib, the first full-length album by Canadian punk band d.b.s.; it was released in 1995
- Tales from the Cryptic, a 2002 album by accordionist Guy Klucevsek and saxophonist Phillip Johnston
- Tales from the Cryptkeeper, a 1993 animated TV series based on the Tales of the Crypt movies and comics
