= Phillip Johnston =

- Born: January 22, 1955 (age 71); Chicago, Illinois, U.S.
- Genres: Avant-garde jazz, classical, film
- Occupations: Musician, composer, educator, author
- Instruments: Soprano, alto & tenor saxophone
- Years active: 1973-present
- Labels: Cuneiform; Tzadik; Avant; Winter & Winter; Innova; Black Saint; Stash; Osmosis; Rufus; RCA Victor; Evidence; Koch Jazz; Asynchronous; Strudelmedia; Bugle; Starkland
- Website: phillipjohnston.com

Phillip Johnston (born January 22, 1955) is an American saxophonist, composer, and author. He came to prominence in the 1980s as co-founder of The Microscopic Septet and went on to write extensively for films, particularly new scores for classic silent films from the early 20th Century.

== Biography ==
Johnston was born in Chicago, Illinois, on January 22, 1955, and raised in the New York City area.

During the 1970s he met and formed relationships with some of his earliest musical associates (John Zorn, Joel Forrester, David Hofstra, Eugene Chadbourne), and moved often between San Francisco and New York City. In 1980 he settled in New York, and soon formed his first ongoing music groups, The Public Servants (with vocalist Shelley Hirsch) and The Microscopic Septet (with pianist Joel Forrester).

Throughout the 80s and 90s and early 2000s, he worked as a leader (The Microscopic Septet, Big Trouble, Transparent Quartet), co-leader and sideperson (Mikel Rouse, Kitty Brazelton, Bobby Radcliff, Rachelle Garniez, Guy Klucevsek, Walter Thompson, Keely Garfield, & Nora York), and began a parallel career in composition for film, theatre, dance and the concert hall. He has a particular interest in contemporary scores for silent film.

In 2005, he moved with his wife, Australian playwright Hilary Bell, and their two children to Sydney, Australia. From that time, he has continued to live and perform in Sydney, but travels regularly to New York and Europe to perform, collaborate and record. His collaborators in Australia have included Lloyd Swanton, Chris Abrahams, Alister Spence, Sandy Evans, Paul Cutlan, Peter Dasent, Matt McMahon, Jex Saarelaht, James Greening, Tim Rollinson and many others. He led or co-led the groups The Greasy Chicken Orchestra, Phillip Johnston & The Coolerators, SNAP, & Tight Corners, and performed at festivals and venues nationally.

== Major works ==
=== Collaborations ===
- Young Goodman Brown (opera with libretto by R. Foreman, based on the Nathaniel Hawthorne short story), premiered in 1995 at LaMaMa ETC by Target Margin Theater, directed by David Herskovitz.
- Venus (play, music for songs by Suzan-Lori Parks) premiered in 1996, by Yale Rep & Public Theater, directed by Richard Foreman.
- Drawn To Death: A Three Panel Opera (opera/musical theatre with book and lyrics by Art Spiegelman), concert version premiered in 2000 at St Ann's Warehouse, workshops at Dartmouth and New York Theater Workshop. Remains unproduced in its final form.
- Wordless! (live multimedia performance work, with Art Spiegelman), commissioned and premiered at Sydney Opera House in 2013, and subsequently toured internationally.
- Do Good And You Will Be Happy (musical with book and lyrics by Hilary Bell)

== Discography ==
=== As leader ===
- Jungle Hotel b/w A Mistake (as The Public Servants) (45 rpm) (Jedible, 1981)
- Normalology (Eighth Day, 1996) (re-released on Koch Jazz, 1999)
- Music for Films (Tzadik, 1998)
- Rub Me the Wrong Way (Innova, 2004)
- Diggin' Bones (Asynchronous, 2018)
- The Adventures of Prince Achmed (Asynchronous, 2018)
- Big Trouble
  - Big Trouble (Black Saint, 1993)
  - Flood at the Ant Farm (Black Saint, 1996)
  - The Unknown (Avant, 1994)
- The Transparent Quartet
  - The Needless Kiss (Koch Jazz, 1998)
  - The Merry Frolics of Satan (Koch Jazz, 1999)
- Page of Madness (Asynchronous, 2009)

=== As co-leader ===
The Microscopic Septet (with Joel Forrester)

- Take the Z Train (Press, 1983)
- Let's Flip! (Osmosis, 1984)
- Off Beat Glory (Osmosis, 1986)
- Beauty Based on Science (Stash, 1988)
- Seven Men in Neckties: The History of the Micros, Vol. 1 (Cuneiform, 2006)
- Surrealistic Swing: The History of the Micros, Vol. 2 (Cuneiform, 2006)
- Lobster Leaps In (Cuneiform, 2008)
- Friday the 13th: The Micros Play Monk (Cuneiform, 2010)
- Manhattan Moonrise (Cuneiform, 2014)
- Been Up So Long It Looks Like Down To Me: The Micros Play The Blues (Cuneiform, 2017)
- Fast 'N' Bulbous (with Gary Lucas)
  - Pork Chop Blue Around the Rind (Cuneiform, 2005)
  - Waxed Oop (Cuneiform, 2009)
- The Spokes (with Andy Biskin & Curtis Hasselbring)
  - Not So Fast (Strudelmedia, 2011)
- SNAP (with Sandy Evans, Paul Cutlan and Nick Bowd)
  - Boggy Creek Bop (Rufus, 2010)
- Joel Forrester/Phillip Johnston
  - Live at the Hillside (Asynchronous, 2011)
- Guy Klucevsek/Phillip Johnston
  - Tales from the Cryptic (Winter & Winter, 2003)

=== As composer, arranger, player ===
- Guy Klucevsek: Who Stole The Polka? (Eva, 1991) [Pontius Pilate Polka]
- Meridian Arts Ensemble: Smart Went Crazy (Channel Classics, 1993) [Sleeping Beauty]
- Nora York: To Dream The World (Evidence, 1995) [Somebody Else]
- Dominique Eade: When The Wind Was Cool (RCA Victor) (arranger only)
- Michael Callen: Legacy (Significant Other, 1996)
- Guy Klucevsek: Heart of the Andes (Winter & Winter, 2002)
- The Catholics: Yonder (Bugle, 2013)
- Michael Hurley: Snockument (Blue Navigator, 2022) (arranger only)

== Filmography ==
- 1984 Committed dir. by Lynne Tillman and Sheila McLaughlin.
- 1986 Paradise (songs only) dir. by Doris Dörrie
- 1987 When, If Not Now (songs only) dir. by Michael Jüncker
- 1988 How To Be Louise dir. by Ann Flournoy
- 1988 What Then dir. by John Inwood
- 1989 Money dir. by Doris Dörrie
- 1992 Money Man dir. by Philip Haas
- 1992 The Clean Up dir. by Jane Weinstock
- 1993 The Music of Chance dir. by Philip Haas
- 1994 Umbrellas dir. by Henry Corra/Graham Weinbren/Albert Maysles
- 1996 Faithful dir. by Paul Mazursky
- 2000 Sana Que Sana dir. by Ron Daniels
- 2001 Mackenheim dir. by Adam Barr
- 2004 Frames dir. Henry Corra & Charlene Rule (conductor/supervisor only)
- 2007 Stolen Life dir. Jackie Turnure/Peter Rasmussen
- 2008 Noise dir. Henry Bean
- 2010 Mr. Sin: The Abe Saffron Story dir. Hugh Piper
- 2015 Shock Room dir. Kathryn Millard
- 2017 Exile dir. Zoe Beloff

== Silent filmography ==
- 1993 The Unknown (1927, dir. Tod Browning)
- 1997 The Georges Méliès Project (1899-1909)
- 1998 Page of Madness (1926, dir. Teinosuke Kinugasa)
- 2003 Faust (1926, dir. F.W. Murnau)
- 2013 The Adventures of Prince Achmed (1926, Lotte Reineger)
- 2022 Cops (1922, Buster Keaton)

== Books and other publications ==
- Silent Films/Loud Music: New ways of listening to and thinking about silent film music. Bloomsbury Academic. 2021. ISBN 978-1-5013-6643-7.
- Book chapter (2021). "The Revolutionary Conservatism of Steve Lacy's Prospectus". In Tarche, Guillaume (ed.). Steve Lacy: (Unfinished) (in French and English). Nantes, France: Lenka Lente. pp. 133–146. ISBN 979-10-94601-40-2.
- Cinema Changes: Incorporations of Jazz in the Film Soundtrack (Chapter: "Jazzin’ The Silents: Jazz and Improvised Music in Contemporary Scores for Silent Film", (edited by Emile Wennekes and Emilio Audissino, Turnhout, Brepols, Speculum Musicae, 34, 2019)
