= John Kruth =

American musician and author

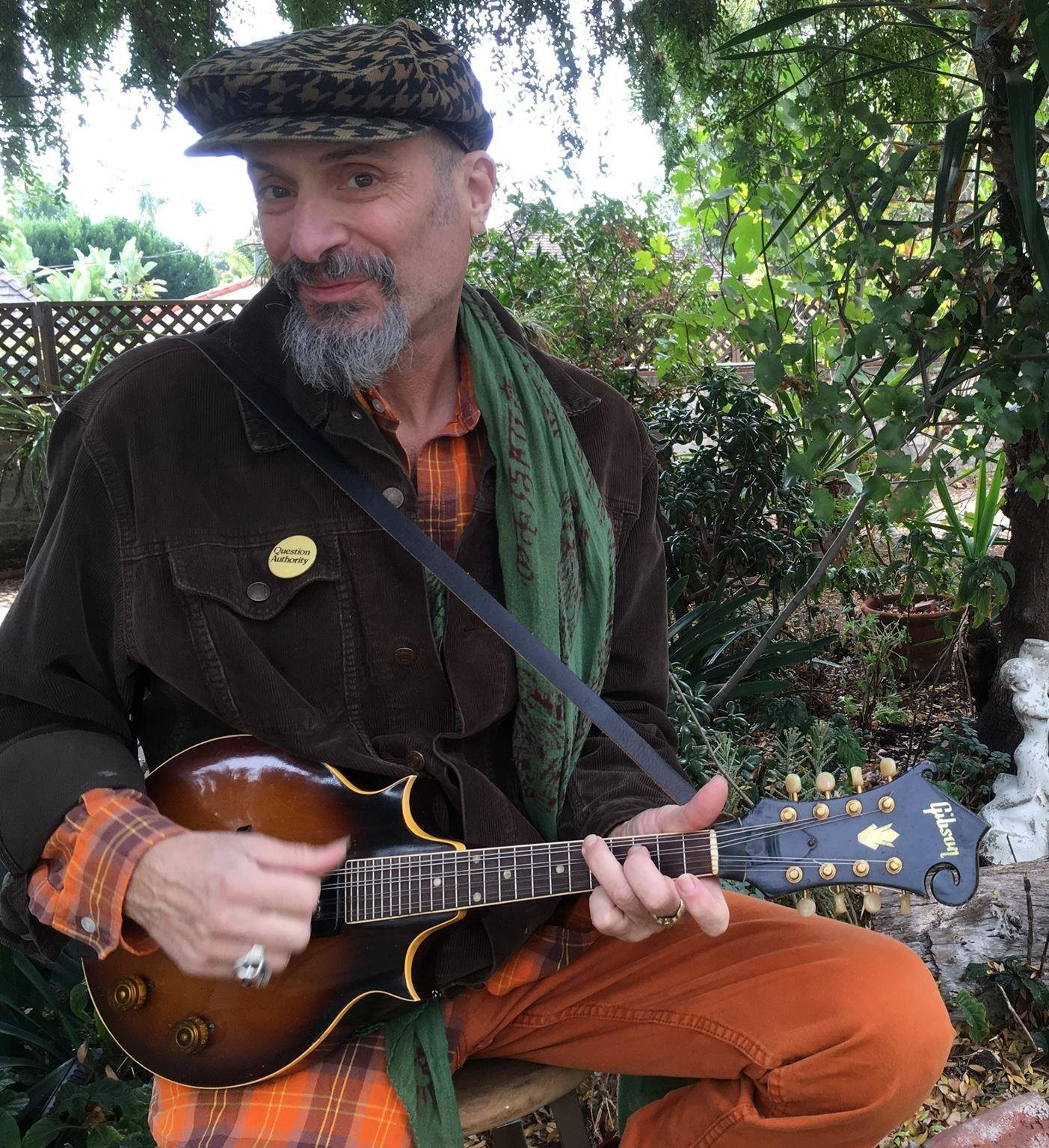
photo by Marilyn Cvitanic

John Kruth is a singer/songwriter/multi-instrumentalist best known for his highly energetic "Banshee Mandolin” style of playing. He has also authored several books on popular music and worked as a music teacher and journalist.

== Biography ==
Born June 19, 1955 in Irvington, New Jersey, John was raised in nearby Livingston. He attended the Minneapolis College of Art & Design, where he studied printmaking and photography until forming the art rock band, The Whirling Dervishes which performed around Minneapolis before relocating to New York and playing at Max's Kansas City, CBGB and Folk City. John is proficient on guitar, banjo, harmonica various flutes and sitar. Kruth is the main composer and music director of The Folklorkestra, a New York-based music ensemble formed after the dissolution of his world music group TriBeCaStan following COVID. After winning a grant from CMA (Chamber Music America) and the Howard Gilman Foundation in January 2023 to write and record an album of new music, John formed the Folklorkestra, composed of former members of TriBeCaStan: John Kruth – mandolin, mandocello, banjo, 12-string guitar, harmonica, flute, sitar and Irish whistle. Premik Russell Tubbs – clarinet, bass clarinet, alto saxophone, alto and bass flute, lap steel guitar. Kathy Halvorson – oboe, English horn. Kenny Margolis – accordion, electric piano, organ, electric harpsichord, clavinet. Ray Peterson – bass. Rohin Khemani – tabla, dumbek, assorted percussion

Kruth's first biography, Bright Moments – The Life and Legacy of Rahsaan Roland Kirk was first published in the U.S. and England in 2000 by Welcome Rain Books. Bright Moments was translated into Japanese and published by Kawade Shobō Shinsha in 2005. His most recent biography is Rhapsody in Black – The Life and Music of Roy Orbison from Hal Leonard Books, NYC. He is also the author of To Live’s To Fly – the Ballad of Townes Van Zandt, was published by Da Capo Books in March 2007, winner of 2008 Deems Taylor ASCAP Award for Best Musical Biography.

Kruth has twelve solo albums to his credit. His 2008 release Splitsville was a sonic travelogue of his year spent in Croatia. In November 1997 Kruth performed at Carnegie Hall as a soloist for composer John Corigliano on the Moroccan folk oboe called the ghaita, commonly played by the Master Musicians of Jajouka. Besides leading the Folklorkestra Kruth has also performed and recorde as a sideman with playwright Sam Shepard, poet Allen Ginsberg, Patti Smith, performance artist Laurie Anderson, producer Hal Willner, folksinger John Prine, as well as Violent Femmes, the Meat Puppets, King Missile, Peter Stampfel, Rick Danko, Garth Hudson, Steve Buscemi, Eric von Schmidt, Stan Ridgeway, Bob Neuwirth, Die Kreuzen, Cindy Lee Berryhill and members of Camper Van Beethoven.

In 2006, he traveled to Chennai, India to study mandolin and perform with Carnatic mandolin virtuoso U. Rajesh.

Kruth has taught music at Manhattan University and the University of Mount Saint Vincent. In the past, his writing has appeared in The New York Times, Rolling Stone, Fretboard Journal, Please Kill Me, Ugly Things and Wax Poetics. He lives in New York City.

== Discography ==
- 1987: Midnight Snack, Hopewell Records (with Violent Femmes)
- 1989: Greasy Kid Stuff, Chameleon Records (with Brian Ritchie)
- 1989: Final Vinyl, Chameleon Records (song Boomerang appeared on picture disc with John Lee Hooker, L7 and Bill Ward)
- 1992: Banshee Mandolin, Flying Fish Records
- 1994: Blind Bear, Dupah Disc (song on children's compilation Shrimp Whistles)
- 1995: Midnight Snack, Spit Records (re-issue of 1987 release)
- 1995: The Cherry Electric, Weasel Disc
- 1996: Toast, Weasel Disc (with Jonathan Segel and Victor Krummenacher)
- 1998: Last Year Was A Great Day, Gadfly Records (with Gordon Gano)
- 1999: Moon Dog Girl, Sparkling Beatnik Records (with Elliott Sharp and Jonathan Segel)
- 2000: Everywhere You’ve Never Been, Label M/Smiling Fez Records (with Frank London)
- 2001: Harry and Albert, Electronic Music Foundation (song on State of the Union compilation produced by Elliott Sharp)
- 2002: Share The Failure, Smithsonian Folkways Records (song on Fast Folk compilation)
- 2004: Songs from the Windy Attic, Smiling Fez Records
- 2007: Eva Destruction, Crustacean Records (with members of Violent Femmes, Plasticland and Die Kreuzen)
- 2008: Splitsville – Sonic Impressions of Croatia (with Matt Darriau, Jonathan Segel and Victor Krummenacher), Smiling Fez Records
- 2015: The Drunken Wind of Life – The Song/Poems of Tin Ujevic (with Miroslav and Gordana Evacic and Jonathan Segel and Victor Krummenacher), Smiling Fez Records
- 2018: Forever Ago, Ars Spoletium Publishing (Italy)
- 2021: Love Letters from The Lazaretto, Smiling Fez Records

With TriBeCaStan

- 2009: Strange Cousin - Evergreene
- 2010: 5-Star Cave - Evergreene
- 2012: New Deli - Evergreene
- 2013: New Songs from the Old Country - Evergreene
- 2015: Goddess Polka Dottess - Evergreene

With The Folklorkestra 2023: A Strange Day in June, Smiling Fez Records

John Kruth has appeared on recordings by James Blood Ulmer, Sex Mob, Reptile Palace Orchestra, Lambchop, Die Kreuzen, Tiny Lights, Brian Ritchie, Gideon Freudmann, Christine Lavin, Lillie Palmer, Rod MacDonald and The Mercy Seat.

== Publications ==
=== Books ===
- 2023 - Lunacy - The Curious Phenomenon of Pink Floyd’s Dark Side of the Moon - 50 Years On – Rowman/Littlefield Publishers, NYC
- 2021 - Hold On World - The Lasting Impact of John Lennon & Yoko Ono's Plastic Ono Band – Rowman/Littlefield Publishers, NYC
- 2017 – A Friend of the Devil – The Glorification of the Outlaw in Song – From Robin Hood to Rap – Hal Leonard Books, NYC
- 2015 – This Bird Has Flown – The Enduring Beauty of Rubber Soul – 50 Years On- Hal Leonard Books, NYC
- 2013 – Rhapsody in Black – The Life and Music of Roy Orbison – Hal Leonard Books, NYC
- 2008 – Rahsaan Roland Kirk – Des Moments Lumineux French edition published by INFOLIO Musique Edition
- 2007 – To Live's To Fly -The Ballad of the Late, Great Townes Van Zandt – Da Capo Books, NYC. Winner of 2008 Deems Taylor ASCAP Award for Best Musical Biography
- 2005 – Bright Moments – The Life and Legacy of Rahsaan Roland Kirk – Japanese edition published by Kawade Shobō Shinsha, Tokyo, Japan. 400 pages.
- 2000 – Bright Moments – The Life and Legacy of Rahsaan Roland Kirk – Welcome Rain Books, NYC. 400 pages.

=== Poetry and Short Prose ===
- 1992 – "Like Jazz" – Spanfeller Press (illustrated by Joe Ciardiello)
- 1992 – "Little Bullets" – Barefoot Press (illustrated by Marvin Hill http://www.marvinhill.com))
- 1989 – "The Bayou Stomp" – Jackalope Press (illustrated by Marvin Hill http://www.marvinhill.com)
- 1989 – "The Horrorscope" – Jackalope Press (with collages by the author)
- 1988 – "The Perfumed Firecracker" – Jackalope Press (illustrated by Lane Smith)
- 1986 – "Bed Crumbs" – Jackalope Press (illustrated by Gary Panter)
- 1984 – "Exorcises" – Jackalope Press (illustrated by Henrik Drescher)
- 1983 – "Modern Heaven" – Jackalope Press (illustrated by Randall Enos)
