= Reader's Digest National Word Power Challenge =

The Reader's Digest National Word Power Challenge was an annual vocabulary competition in the United States for youth in sixth, seventh, or eighth grade. It was sponsored by Reader's Digest magazine.

== Competition ==
=== Levels ===
==== School ====
Competition began at school level. Typically, teachers gave students 25-question multiple-choice tests. Classroom winners then competed with other classroom winners from the same grade to determine the school-wide grade-level champion. The school champion then took a multiple-choice test which determined the top 100 students in the state.

==== State ====
The top 100 students were invited to a state competition, where they were given 25 multiple-choice questions to determine the top ten. The top ten then went through a few rounds of questions to determine the state champion. The state champion advanced to national competition.

==== National ====
Students from every state, Washington, D.C., and one student from a Department of Defense school got to compete at national level. The students took a 25-question multiple-choice test, with the top ten scorers going on to compete in a nationally televised event. The moderator was a celebrity; Al Roker was a regular.

=== Prizes ===
- All students at the state level received treat bags.
- The top 10 students at the state level received Reader's Digest books.
- All students at the national level received treat bags.
- All state winners were offered free trips to the location of the national competition (usually Florida).
- Scholarships were awarded at the national level:
  - First place: $25,000
  - Second place: $15,000
  - Third place: $10,000

== Current status ==
In 2007, the RDNWPC website stated that the competition would not be held for the 2007-2008 year. The Reader's Digest website no longer mentions the RDNWPC.

== Past winners and top finishers ==
| Installment of competition (academic/competition year) | First place (state represented, grade level) | Second place (state represented, grade level) | Third place (state represented, grade level) |
| 1 (2002-03) | William Brannon (Virginia, 8) | Gordon Bourjaily (Iowa, 8) | Richard Lyford (New York, 8) |
| 2 (2003-04) | Spencer Gill (Michigan, 7) | Jeffrey Seigal (Maryland, 8) | Ajay Ravichandran (North Carolina, 8) |
| 3 (2004-05) | Ming-Ming Tran (New Jersey, 6) | Billy Dorminy (Georgia, 8) | Levi Foster (Arkansas, 8) |
| 4 (2005-06) | Joe Shepherd (Georgia, 8) | William Johnson (Virginia, 8) | Christopher Molini (Nebraska, 8) |
| 5 (2006-07) | Matthew Evans (New Mexico, 12-year-old home-schooler at seventh-grade level) | Hannah Brown (South Carolina, 7) | Camille Guillot (Louisiana, 8) |

== See also ==
- National Vocabulary Championship (now defunct)
- Scripps National Spelling Bee
