= National Vocabulary Championship =

High school vocabulary competition

The National Vocabulary Championship (NVC) was the first-ever U.S.-wide vocabulary competition for high school students created by GSN, in association with The Princeton Review. Thirty thousand high school students from across the United States participated in the inaugural year (2006–2007).

The NVC aimed to inspire students to expand their vocabularies and narrow the achievement gap. The program offered free educational resources, created spirited competition through testing and game play, and awarded more than $100,000 annually in college tuition and other prizes.

Fifty finalists nationally received a trip to the NVC Finals, where they competed to win $40,000 toward college tuition in the form of a 529 plan and to be crowned the National Vocabulary Champion.

The host of the National Vocabulary Championship was GSN host Dylan Lane.

The NVC was discontinued after the 2007–2008 academic and competition year due to changes in GSN policy and administration.

== How to Compete ==
The NVC was open to eligible high school students in the United States between the ages of 13 and 19 years old and in grades 9–12. Home-schooled students were also eligible to compete.

There were two ways to enter the competition:

Eligible students at participating schools in eight local markets could qualify to participate in a Citywide Championship for a chance to win $5,000 toward college tuition and other prizes, as well as a trip to the national finals.

Eligible students nationwide could also participate through a National Qualifying Competition via on-line and regional exams offered by The Princeton Review for a chance to compete in the NVC Finals.

== 2007-2008 Citywide Championships ==
Eight U.S. cities across the country were chosen each year to host Citywide Championship events. Eligible students who wanted to compete in one of the local Citywide Championships had to attend a participating high school, register with the designated NVC coach at their school, and take the NVC in-school qualifying exam. All public and private high schools within these markets and their surrounding areas were invited to participate and encourage their students to compete. Approximately 100 top scorers per market qualified to compete in each Citywide Championship, where one winner received $5,000 toward college tuition and other prizes as well as a trip to the national finals.

Below is a list of cities that the NVC visited in 2007–2008:

- Sacramento: Thursday, November 15 -- WINNER: Yvonne Lin (Sophomore)
- Nashville: Tuesday, November 27 -- WINNER: Brian Swenson (Junior)
- St. Louis: Thursday, November 29 -- WINNER: Rajiv Tarigopula (Sophomore)
- Detroit: Monday, December 3 -- WINNER: Steven Banks (Senior)
- Northeast Ohio: Thursday, December 6 -- WINNER: Joel Fichter (Senior)
- New York: Monday, December 10 -- WINNER: Rebecca Maxfield (Junior)
- Pittsburgh: Monday, January 14 -- WINNER: John Oxenreiter (Senior)
- Philadelphia: Thursday, January 17 -- WINNER: Lauren Bezjak (Junior)

== National Qualifying Competition ==
Eligible high school students who did not attend a participating school (listed under Citywide Championship) or who did not wish to take the in-school qualifying exam could compete in the National Qualifying Competition by following the below steps: 1) The NVC offered an online national qualifying exam during November 2007 at winwithwords.com. For months leading up to the online exam, study tools and study modules were available at winwithwords.com Or: 2) Top-scoring students on the online national qualifying exam had an opportunity to advance to the regional exams, which took place at designated The Princeton Review locations across the country. Forty-two top scorers from the National Qualifying Competition joined the eight citywide champions at the national finals.

== Champions ==
Year	Winner's Name	Home Town	Grade	Winning Sentence	Winning Question	Answer
2006-2007	Robert Marsland	Madison, Wisconsin	12th	The hirsute professor maintains that his solipsism stems from a bona fide philosophical conviction rather than excessive narcissism.	Which word comes from the Latin for "alone"?	solipsism
2007-2008	Aliya Deri	Pleasanton, California	11th	Joseph was not perturbed by his pal's peccadillo, but his parents apprehended it to be an unambiguous portent of future dereliction.	Which word comes from the Latin for "sin"?	peccadillo

== See also ==
- Reader's Digest National Word Power Challenge (now defunct; held only in competition years 2002-03 through 2006–07)
- Scripps National Spelling Bee
