= Wallace Foundation =

Philanthropy organization based in New York, U.S.

The Wallace Foundation
- Formation: 2003
- Purpose: charitable works and philanthropy
- Headquarters: New York City
- Location(s): 140 Broadway; Manhattan, New York City
- President: Jean S. Desravines (as of September 2025)
- Board of directors: 11 members
- Staff: 49
- Website: www.wallacefoundation.org

The Wallace Foundation is a national philanthropic organization based in New York City that seeks to foster improvements in learning and enrichment for disadvantaged children and the vitality of the arts for everyone. The foundation aims to develop knowledge about how to solve social problems, and promote widespread solutions based on that knowledge, by funding projects to test ideas, commissioning independent research to find out what works, and communicating the results to help practitioners, policymakers and leading thinkers.

== History ==
The Wallace Foundation began with the philanthropy of DeWitt and Lila Acheson Wallace, who together founded the Reader's Digest Association in 1922. Drawing on the money they earned from the magazine, the Wallaces contributed to a wide assortment of artistic, cultural and youth-serving causes. Dewitt Wallace died in 1981 and Lila Wallace died in 1984, leaving much of their fortune to four private foundations they had created in their lifetimes, which later merged into two: the DeWitt Wallace-Reader's Digest Fund, which focused on education and youth and the Lila Wallace-Reader's Digest Fund, which focused on arts and culture.

In 2003 a single national foundation, The Wallace Foundation, emerged from the consolidation of these private foundations.

== Major initiatives ==
The Wallace Foundation has five major initiatives underway:

- School Leadership: For more than a decade, Wallace has been working with states and school districts to develop better ways to train, hire, support and evaluate principals and other key figures in schools.
- Afterschool: Wallace supports efforts in a group of cities to coordinate the work of municipal agencies, schools, youth-serving nonprofits and other institutions vital to afterschool in order to generate ideas about how to improve the quality of programs and make better use of data.
- Arts Education: Since 2005, Wallace has been working with school districts and nonprofits to test ways to engage more young people in high-quality arts learning during the school day and beyond.
- Summer and Expanded Learning: Wallace seeks to better understand the impact of high-quality summer learning programs on disadvantaged children, as well as how to enrich and expand the school day in ways that benefit students.
- Audience Development for the Arts: Wallace supports the development and testing of innovative ideas to reach new audiences so that many more people might enjoy the benefits of the arts.
