= My Last Wonderful Days =

1956 article by Hazel Beck Andre

"My Last Wonderful Days" is a July 1956 article written by Hazel Beck Andre about her accepting her dying from cancer. It was first published in Farm Journal and Country Gentleman, later being republished in Reader's Digest. It was further republished with a circulation of 17,103,302 copies.

== Death from cancer ==
Hazel Beck Andre died in 1956 from cancer when she was 42 years old, a few weeks after writing "My Last Wonderful Days". In the article, Andre wrote that the "hardest part" of dying was leaving her family and that she later had "no regret" due to her life being "rich and full". Andre wrote of things that she would do if she lived her life over again including "savoring" the beauty of "sunrises, the patina of an old brass coffee pot, and the delighted look on a tiny girl's face when she pets a kitty for the first time". Andre received the book A Diary of Private Prayer by John Baillie from her minister. She read a prayer in the book which helped her overcome the main concern of leaving her family. She prepared for her death with her husband, the Iowa State University Dean of Agriculture Floyd Andre, and their three children.

== Impact ==
The January 1960 issue of Relief Society Magazine, a publication of the Church of Jesus Christ of Latter-day Saints, wrote that the article "provides guidance and inspiration not only for those who anticipate death, but for anyone who wishes to live creatively throughout life, realizing that death will ultimately come to him." Helen A. Hayes of Adams County Free Press said that "My Last Wonderful Days" "is an article not soon forgotten".

The Hazel Beck Andre Journalism Scholarship at Iowa State University is awarded to junior college students who major in Journalism and Mass Communication. The scholarship was started in 1956 through purchases of the article.
