= NVC International =

Chinese multinational corporation

NVC International Holdings Ltd.
- Company type: Public
- Traded as: SEHK: 2222
- Industry: Lighting
- Predecessor: NVC Lighting
- Founded: 1998
- Headquarters: Hong Kong, China
- Key people: Wang Donglei (Chairman and CEO); Xiao Yu; Wang Keven Dun; Eva Kim Yung Chan
- Products: Electric Lights, Lighting Fixtures, LEDs
- Brands: NVC Lighting; ETI Lighting; Dernier & Hamlyn
- Revenue: US$235,978,000 (2023)
- Operating income: US$6,777,000 (2023)
- Net income: US$35,173,000 (2023)
- Subsidiaries: NVC Lighting Ltd. ETI Solid State Lighting Inc. Dernier & Hamlyn Design Ltd.
- Website: nvc-international.com

NVC International Holdings Ltd. (NVC) is a Chinese multinational corporation specializing in the manufacture and supply of lighting products. Founded in 1998 and headquartered in Hong Kong, NVC Lighting produces a range of lighting solutions for commercial, industrial, and residential applications. The company's product portfolio includes LED lights, indoor and outdoor lighting fixtures, and lighting control systems, serving various sectors such as retail, hospitality, industrial facilities, and public infrastructure.

== Company Overview ==
NVC Lighting was founded by Wu Changjiang in 1998. Prior to establishing NVC, Wu was a manager for a different lighting company in Shenzhen.

NVC experienced significant growth, becoming one of the largest lighting manufacturers in China. The company opened its UK operation in 2009, supplying commercial, industrial, and exterior lighting products to wholesalers in the UK and the Irish Republic. In May 2010, NVC Lighting was listed on the Hong Kong Stock Exchange.

In 2019, KKR acquired a majority stake in NVC's China Lighting Business. The transaction resulted in KKR obtaining control of 70 percent of NVC China, while NVC Lighting retained the remaining 30 percent. That same year, NVC Lighting rebranded as NVC International Holdings Limited.

== Products ==
NVC Lighting's product range encompasses both traditional lighting products and advanced LED technology. The company focuses on producing energy-efficient lighting solutions, incorporating smart lighting controls and Internet of Things (IoT) technologies into their designs.

NVC has provided lighting solutions for notable international events, including the 2008 Summer Olympics in Beijing and the 2010 FIFA World Cup in South Africa.

== Brands ==
=== NVC Lighting ===
NVC Lighting is the UK subsidiary of NVC International, based in a facility in Birmingham that includes the company's offices, a warehouse, and an assembly unit for custom products. From this location, NVC Lighting serves the UK and Ireland markets directly and manages its subsidiaries in Finland, Norway, Denmark, and Sweden. The company produces various categories of commercial lighting for indoor and outdoor use.

=== ETI Lighting ===
ETI is a manufacturer of commercial lighting fixtures in the United States. The company's product range includes tubes, ceiling lights, shop lights, and under-cabinet lighting products. ETI serves customers in US and Canada. The company is a major supplier of lighting products to The Home Depot, and was one of The Home Depot's 2016 Supplier Partner of the Year awardees.

=== Dernier & Hamlyn ===
Dernier & Hamlyn is a UK-based lighting manufacturer acquired by NVC in 2020. Established in 1888, the company initially specialized in creating hand-decorated lampshades using fine silks from France and China. Dernier & Hamlyn is known for its bespoke lighting solutions and has been involved in various high-profile projects, including the Nobu London Portman Square, NoMad Las Vegas, The Standard London, Four Seasons Hotel Hampshire, Adare Manor and Kimpton Fitzroy London, among others. Additionally, the company contributed lighting fixtures to the renovation of the Fairfield Halls concert hall in Croydon, UK.

== Company’s Restructuring ==
In May 2012, Wu Changjiang resigned as chairman of NVC Lighting, succeeded by Andrew Yan. This transition prompted stakeholder resistance, including factory worker strikes and appeals from suppliers and distributors for Wu's reinstatement. The period was marked by financial volatility, with the company's stock value declining 28.37% in August 2012, accompanied by several key executive resignations.

A major ownership shift occurred in December 2012 when Wang Donglei of Elec-Tech International acquired 11.81% of NVC's shares. Wang subsequently joined the board as a non-executive director and was appointed chairman in early 2013.

In August 2014, the board removed Wu Changjiang from his chief executive position, appointing Wang Donglei as interim CEO. The restructuring included the dismissal of several vice presidents and the temporary relocation of company headquarters from Chongqing to Huizhou, Guangdong.

In August 2019, NVC Lighting entered into a Share Purchase Agreement with KKR, establishing a joint venture in which KKR acquired a majority stake in NVC's China Lighting Business. The transaction, completed through KKR's Asian Fund III, resulted in KKR obtaining majority control of the China operations.

=== Litigation ===
In October 2014, Wu became the subject of an embezzlement investigation. NVC's board reported discovering unauthorized financial transactions, including loan pledges allegedly made without board approval.

By December 2014, media sources reported Wu's detention in Huizhou, Guangdong, and the freezing of his company shares, valued at 1.1 billion yuan. The company alleged misappropriation of approximately 573 million yuan from various corporate accounts, with claims of potential collusion from banking executives.
