= Lila Acheson Wallace =

American magazine publisher and philanthropist (1889-1984)

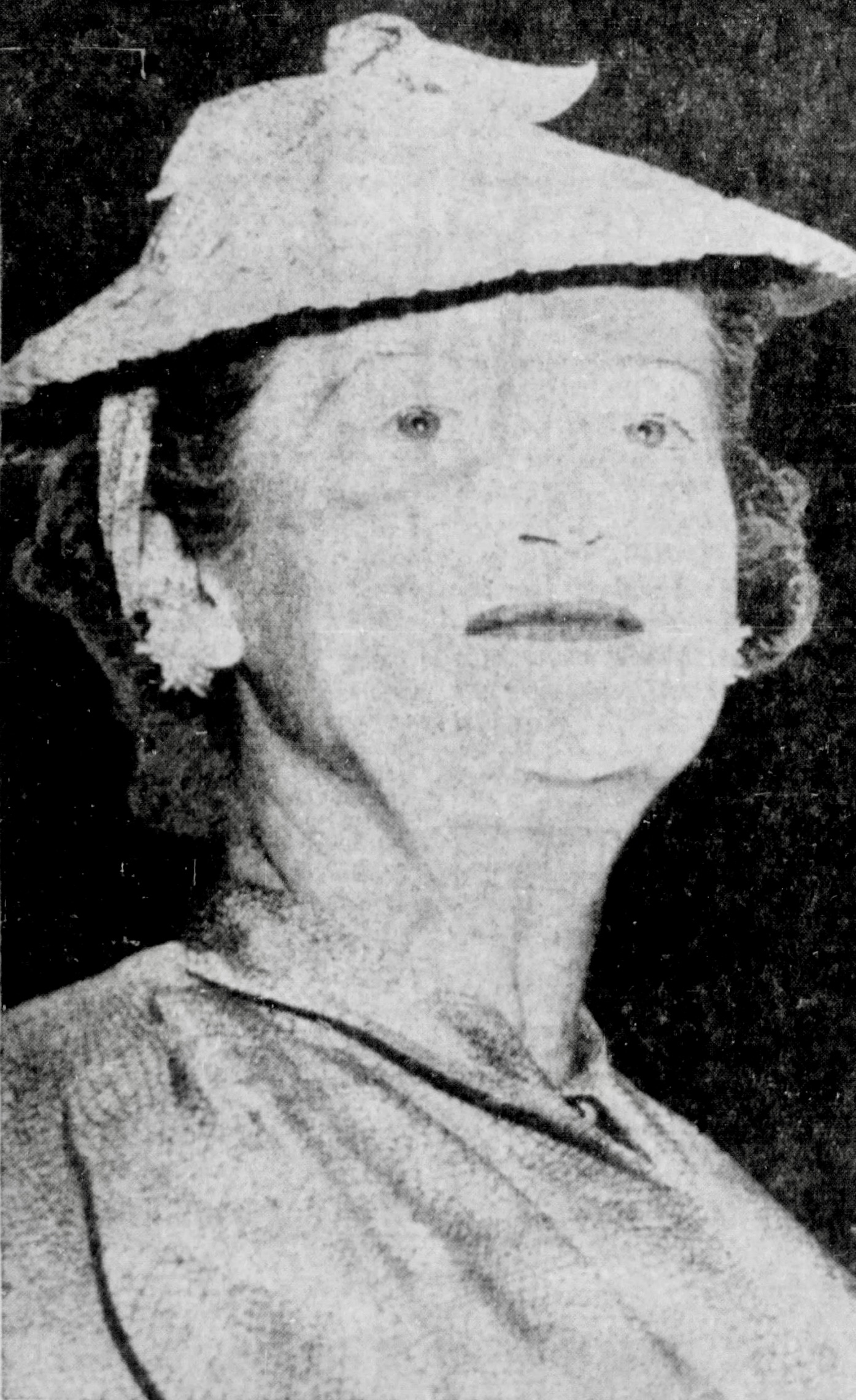
- Wallace, c. 1955
- Born: Lila Bell Acheson; December 25, 1889; Virden, Manitoba, Canada
- Died: May 8, 1984 (aged 94); Mount Kisco, New York, United States
- Education: Ward-Belmont College
- Occupation: Magazine publisher
- Known for: Co founding Reader's Digest with her husband Lila Wallace-Reader's Digest Fund
- Spouse: Dewitt Wallace (m. 1921)

Lila Bell Wallace (December 25, 1889 – May 8, 1984) was an American magazine publisher and philanthropist. She co-founded Reader's Digest with her husband Dewitt Wallace, publishing the first issue in 1922.

== Early life and education ==
Born Lila Bell Acheson in Virden, Manitoba, Canada, her father was a Presbyterian minister who brought his family to the United States when she was a child, and she grew up in Marshall, Minnesota, and Lewistown, Illinois, where her father preached. Her brother, Barclay Acheson, was an executive director of the Near East Foundation and served as an editor of Reader's Digest.

In 1917, she graduated from the University of Oregon, located in Eugene, Oregon, taught at schools for two years, and then worked for the Young Women's Christian Association. She also studied at Ward–Belmont College in Nashville, Tennessee.

== Career ==
In 1921, she married DeWitt Wallace in Pleasantville, New York. The couple co-founded the Reader's Digest magazine, with the first publication in 1922. For many years, Reader's Digest was the best-selling consumer magazine in the United States.

In her lifetime, she made philanthropic contributions estimated at $60 million. One of her major projects was the establishment of the Metropolitan Opera National Company, the national touring company of the Metropolitan Opera, in 1963. She continued to support the MONC until the Metropolitan Opera decided to disband the organization at the conclusion of the 1966–1967 season.

== Death and legacy ==
She died from heart failure, age 94, in Mount Kisco, New York. The Lila Wallace-Reader's Digest Writers' Awards were given annually in her memory from 1990 to 2000.

In 1966, Wallace received the Golden Plate Award of the American Academy of Achievement. On January 28, 1972, she was presented with the Presidential Medal of Freedom by President Richard Nixon. In 1992, she was posthumously awarded the National Medal of Arts.

== See also ==
- List of people from New York
- List of Presidential Medal of Freedom recipients
- List of University of Oregon alumni
