= Paul Shapiro (musician) =

American saxophonist

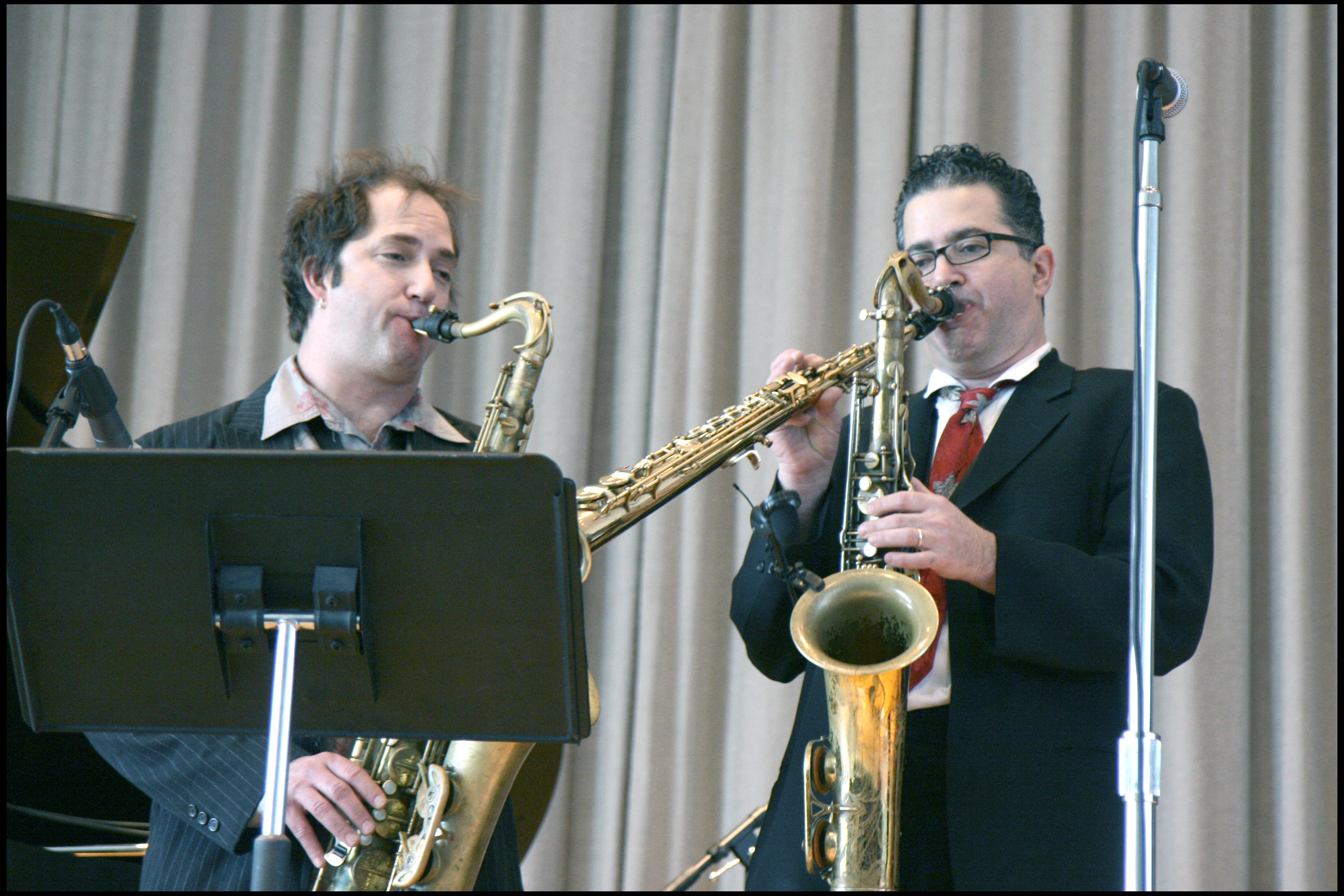
Avant-garde jazz composer Peter Apfelbaum with Paul Shapiro (right), April 2008

Paul Shapiro is an American jazz, world and klezmer saxophonist and flute player from New York City.

== Career ==
From 1983 to 2007, Shapiro recorded eight albums, toured, and frequently played tenor saxophone in New York City with the Microscopic Septet.

In 1994, Shapiro co-founded a musical collective with American record producer Arthur Baker called Brooklyn Funk Essentials. In 2014, the Wall Street Journal's music critic Will Friedwald wrote that "Shapiro's tenor saxophone sound itself is big, rich and full, and 'davens' in the direction of the great Italian tenors, like Vido Musso, Charlie Ventura and Sam Butera."

In 2020, Shapiro performed a homage to the Amazon Prime series The Marvelous Mrs. Maisel.

== Discography ==
1. Midnight Minyan (2003)
2. It's In The Twilight (2006)
3. Essen (2008)
4. Shofarot Verses (2014)

=== Appearances ===
- John Zorn - John Zorn's Cobra: Live at the Knitting Factory (1992)
- Janet Jackson - Janet Remixed (1995)
- Ben Folds Five - the Unauthorized Biography of Reinhold Messner (1999)
- Lou Reed - Ecstasy (2000)
- Lou Reed - The Raven (2003)
- Yoko Kanno's band Seatbelts - soundtrack of the Cowboy Bebop video game (2004)
- Rufus Wainwright - Release the Stars (2007)
- David Byrne and Brian Eno - Everything That Happens Will Happen Today (2008)
- Lou Reed concert film - Berlin: Live at St. Ann's Warehouse (2008)
