= World's Best Reading =

Series of editions of classic books

- Author: Various
- Language: English
- Publisher: Reader's Digest
- Published: 1982–2013
- No. of books: 155+

The World's Best Reading is a series of classic books published by Reader's Digest beginning in 1982. The series is distributed as a mail order membership club. Some individual volumes are available for sale directly through the Reader's Digest website. The series began with limited editions in 1982, then expanded to bi-monthly editions for years 1984 to 1995.

The series is still in print. Many of the editions are ornately illustrated and included commissioned artwork. Each volume includes a small paper pamphlet with a biography of the author.

== Editions ==
| No. | Title | Author | Date |
|---|---|---|---|
| 1 | The Red Badge of Courage | Stephen Crane | 1982 |
| 2 | Wuthering Heights | Emily Brontë | 1983 |
| 3 | The Last of the Mohicans | James Fenimore Cooper | 1984 |
| 4 | Jane Eyre | Charlotte Brontë | 1984 |
| 5 | Pride and Prejudice | Jane Austen | 1984 |
| 6 | A Tale of Two Cities | Charles Dickens | 1984 |
| 7 | A Connecticut Yankee in King Arthur's Court | Mark Twain | 1984 |
| 8 | The Scarlet Letter | Nathaniel Hawthorne | 1984 |
| 9 | Tess of the D'Urbervilles | Thomas Hardy | 1985 |
| 10 | The House of the Seven Gables | Nathaniel Hawthorne | 1985 |
| 11 | Little Women | Louisa May Alcott | 1985 |
| 12 | The Adventures of Tom Sawyer | Mark Twain | 1985 |
| 13 | Great Expectations | Charles Dickens | 1985 |
| 14 | The Call of the Wild and White Fang | Jack London | 1985 |
| 15 | Kidnapped | Robert Louis Stevenson | 1986 |
| 16 | The Adventures of Huckleberry Finn | Mark Twain | 1986 |
| 17 | Tales of Suspense | Edgar Allan Poe | 1986 |
| 18 | A Study in Scarlet and The Hound of the Baskervilles | Sir Arthur Conan Doyle | 1986 |
| 19 | Silas Marner | George Eliot | 1986 |
| 20 | David Copperfield | Charles Dickens | 1986 |
| 21 | The Legend of Sleepy Hollow and Other Tales | Washington Irving | 1987 |
| 22 | The Adventures of Sherlock Holmes | Sir Arthur Conan Doyle | 1987 |
| 23 | For the Term of His Natural Life | Marcus Clarke | 1987 |
| 24 | The Gift of the Magi and Other Stories | O. Henry | 1987 |
| 25 | Oliver Twist | Charles Dickens | 1987 |
| 26 | Life on the Mississippi | Mark Twain | 1987 |
| 27 | Treasure Island | Robert Louis Stevenson | 1987 |
| 28 | The Old Curiosity Shop | Charles Dickens | 1988 |
| 29 | The Memoirs of Sherlock Holmes | Sir Arthur Conan Doyle | 1988 |
| 30 | Around the World in 80 Days | Jules Verne | 1988 |
| 31 | A Christmas Carol and Other Stories | Charles Dickens | 1988 |
| 32 | The Prince and the Pauper | Mark Twain | 1988 |
| 33 | The Virginian | Owen Wister | 1988 |
| 34 | A Passage to India | E.M. Forster | 1989 |
| 35 | The Sea-Wolf | Jack London | 1989 |
| 36 | The Song of Hiawatha and Other Poems | Henry Wadsworth Longfellow | 1989 |
| 37 | Twice-Told Tales | Nathaniel Hawthorne | 1989 |
| 38 | A Tree Grows in Brooklyn | Betty Smith | 1989 |
| 39 | Moby Dick | Herman Melville | 1989 |
| 40 | Kim | Rudyard Kipling | 1990 |
| 41 | Twenty Thousand Leagues Under the Seas | Jules Verne | 1990 |
| 42 | On Our Selection and Our New Selection | Steele Rudd | 1990 |
| 43 | Lost Horizon | James Hilton | 1990 |
| 44 | The Innocents Abroad | Mark Twain | 1990 |
| 45 | O Pioneers! | Willa Cather | 1990 |
| 46 | Doctor Zhivago | Boris Leonidovich Pasternak | 1990 |
| 47 | Tales from the Arabian Nights | | 1991 |
| 48 | The Grapes of Wrath | John Steinbeck | 1991 |
| 49 | Uncle Tom's Cabin | Harriet Beecher Stowe | 1991 |
| 50 | The Strange Case of Dr. Jekyll and Mr. Hyde | Robert Louis Stevenson | 1991 |
| 51 | The Return of Sherlock Holmes | Sir Arthur Conan Doyle | 1991 |
| 52 | The Adventures of Robin Hood | Paul Creswick | 1991 |
| 53 | A Journey to the Center of the Earth | Jules Verne | 1992 |
| 54 | The Celebrated Jumping Frog and Other Stories | Mark Twain | 1992 |
| 55 | Ben-Hur: A Tale of the Christ | Lew Wallace | 1992 |
| 56 | The Good Earth | Pearl S. Buck | 1992 |
| 57 | The Caine Mutiny | Herman Wouk | 1992 |
| 58 | Anne of Green Gables | L. M. Montgomery | 1992 |
| 59 | The Wind in the Willows | Kenneth Grahame | 1993 |
| 60 | The Further Adventures of Sherlock Holmes | Sir Arthur Conan Doyle | 1993 |
| 61 | Dusty and Man Shy | Frank Dalby Davison | 1993 |
| 62 | Life with Father | Clarence Day | 1993 |
| 63 | The Yearling | Marjorie Kinnan Rawlings | 1993 |
| 64 | To Kill a Mockingbird | Harper Lee | 1993 |
| 65 | The Robe | Lloyd Cassell Douglas | 1993 |
| 66 | Heart of the West | O. Henry | 1993 |
| 67 | Rebecca | Daphne du Maurier | 1994 |
| 68 | The Thirty-Nine Steps and Greenmantle | John Buchan | 1994 |
| 69 | Emma | Jane Austen | 1994 |
| 70 | To Build a Fire and Other Stories | Jack London | 1994 |
| 71 | King Solomon's Mines | H. Rider Haggard | 1994 |
| 72 | Captains Courageous | Rudyard Kipling | 1994 |
| 73 | Roughing It | Mark Twain | 1994 |
| 74 | Lorna Doone | R. D. Blackmore | 1995 |
| 75 | A Town Like Alice | Nevil Shute | 1995 |
| 76 | Tales of the South Pacific | James Michener | 1995 |
| 77 | Two Years Before the Mast | Richard Henry Dana Jr. | 1995 |
| 78 | Beau Geste | Percival Christopher Wren | 1995 |
| 79 | The Master of Ballantrae: A Winter's Tale | Robert Louis Stevenson | 1995 |
| 80 | Goodbye Mr. Chips and Other Stories | James Hilton | 1995 |
| 81 | Lost Horizon, Good-bye Mr. Chips and Other Stories | James Hilton | 1997 |
| 82 | The Jungle Books | Rudyard Kipling | 1997 |
| 83 | How Green Was My Valley | Richard Llewellyn | 1997 |
| 84 | Three Men in a Boat and Three Men on the Bummel | Jerome K. Jerome | 1998 |
| 85 | The Three Musketeers | Alexandre Dumas | 1999 |
| 86 | The Mayor of Casterbridge | Thomas Hardy | 1999 |
| 87 | Far From the Madding Crowd | Thomas Hardy | 2002 |
| 88 | The Age of Innocence | Edith Wharton | 2003 |
| 89 | This Side of Paradise | F. Scott Fitzgerald | 2003 |
| 90 | Frankenstein | Mary Shelley | 2003 |
| 91 | Sense and Sensibility | Jane Austen | 2003 |
| 92 | Lord Jim | Joseph Conrad | 2003 |
| 95 | Robinson Crusoe | Daniel Defoe | 2004 |
| 96 | My Antonia | Willa Cather | 2004 |
| 97 | The Invisible Man and The Island of Dr. Moreau | H. G. Wells | 2004 |
| 98 | Gulliver's Travels | Jonathan Swift | 2004 |
| 99 | The Moon and Sixpence | W. S. Maugham | 2004 |
| 100 | Main Street | Sinclair Lewis | 2004 |
| 101 | Daisy Miller and The Turn of the Screw | Henry James | 2005 |
| 102 | The Jungle Books | Rudyard Kipling | 2005 |
| 103 | Madame Bovary | Gustave Flaubert | 2005 |
| 104 | Mansfield Park | Jane Austen | 2005 |
| 105 | The Magnificent Ambersons | Booth Tarkington | 2005 |
| 107 | The War of the Worlds and The Time Machine | H. G. Wells | 2005 |
| 108 | Little Men | Louisa May Alcott | 2006 |
| 109 | The Man of Property | John Galsworthy | 2006 |
| 110 | Hard Times | Charles Dickens | 2006 |
| 111 | Barchester Towers | Anthony Trollope | 2006 |
| 112 | Moll Flanders | Daniel Defoe | 2006 |
| 113 | The American | Henry James | 2007 |
| 114 | The Phantom of the Opera | Gaston Leroux | 2007 |
| 115 | Persuasion | Jane Austen | 2007 |
| 116 | The Picture of Dorian Gray | Oscar Wilde | 2007 |
| 117 | The Black Arrow | Robert Louis Stevenson | 2007 |
| 118 | Dracula | Bram Stoker | 2007 |
| 119 | Sons and Lovers | D. H. Lawrence | 2008 |
| 120 | Northanger Abbey | Jane Austen | 2008 |
| 121 | The House of Mirth | Edith Wharton | 2008 |
| 122 | The Prisoner of Zenda and Rupert of Hentzau | Anthony Hope | 2008 |
| 123 | The Ambassadors | Henry James | 2008 |
| 124 | Heart of Darkness and End of the Tether | Joseph Conrad | 2008 |
| 125 | Agnes Grey | Anne Brontë | 2009 |
| 126 | Howards End | E. M. Forster | 2009 |
| 127 | The Confidence-Man | Herman Melville | 2009 |
| 128 | Return of the Native | Thomas Hardy | 2009 |
| 129 | The Secret Garden and A Little Princess | Frances Hodgson Burnett | 2009 |
| 130 | Ethan Frome and Summer | Edith Wharton | 2009 |
| 131 | Fathers and Sons | Ivan Turgenev | 2010 |
| 132 | Where Angels Fear to Tread and A Room With a View | E. M. Forster | 2010 |
| 133 | Adam Bede | George Eliot | 2010 |
| 134 | Wuthering Heights | Emily Brontë | 2010 |
| 135 | Jo's Boys | Louisa May Alcott | 2010 |
| 136 | The Way of All Flesh | Samuel Butler | 2010 |
| 137 | Treasure Island / Kidnapped | Robert Louis Stevenson | 2010 |
| 138 | Oliver Twist | Charles Dickens | 2010 |
| 139 | Pride & Prejudice | Jane Austen | 2011 |
| 140 | Babbitt | Sinclair Lewis | 2011 |
| 141 | The Adventures Of Huckleberry Finn | Mark Twain | 2011 |
| 142 | The Scarlet Letter | Nathaniel Hawthorne | 2011 |
| 143 | A Tale of Two Cities | Charles Dickens | 2011 |
| 144 | The Good Soldier | Ford Madox Ford | 2011 |
| 145 | The Jungle | Upton Sinclair | 2011 |
| 146 | A Study In Scarlet / The Hound Of The Baskervilles | Sir Arthur Conan Doyle | 2011 |
| 147 | The Moonstone | Wilkie Collins | 2011 |
| 148 | Robinson Crusoe | Daniel Defoe | 2011 |
| 149 | The War of the Worlds / The Time Machine | H. G. Wells | 2011 |
| 150 | Jo's Boys | Louisa May Alcott | 2011 |
| 151 | Ivanhoe | Sir Walter Scott | 2012 |
| 152 | The Last of the Mohicans | James Fenimore Cooper | 2012 |
| 153 | Lorna Doone | R D Blackmore | 2013 |
| 154 | The Age of Innocence | Edith Wharton | 2003 |
