= Tales from the Cryptic =

Studio album by Guy Klucevsek and Phillip Johnston
- Released: 2003
- Recorded: September 23 & 24, 2002; Le Domaine De Lescombes, Eysines, France
- Genre: Classical music, Jazz
- Length: 64:04
- Label: Winter & Winter 910 088
- Producer: Mariko Takahashi & Stefan Winter

Guy Klucevsek chronology
The Heart of the Andes (2002)	Tales from the Cryptic (2003)	The Well-Tampered Accordion (2004)

Tales from the Cryptic is an album by accordionist Guy Klucevsek with saxophonist Phillip Johnston which was recorded in 2002 and released on the Winter & Winter label.

== Reception ==
Professional ratings
Review scores
Source	Rating
Allmusic	4/5 stars

In his review for Allmusic, Thom Jurek said that "This is a breathtaking recording, full of humor, warmth, tenderness, and plenty of instrumental fire that feels more like a live performance than a studio recording. Highly recommended". In JazzTimes, Aaron Steinberg observed "The two players stroll through winsome ballads, spirited dances and dark, carnivalesque themes while claiming liberties and creative detours that hardly jeopardize the balance of these modestly scaled pieces. They jump in and out of structured passages with grace, inject the music with tartness and just as convincingly (and with only the slightest hints of tongue-in-cheek) navigate the sweetest of melodies".

== Track listing ==
All compositions by Guy Klucevsek except as indicated

1. "Spin Cycle" - 4:20
2. "Tulips Are Better Than One" - 3:44
3. "Am-Scray" (Phillip Johnston) - 4:38
4. "The Gift" - 5:26
5. "Trial By Error" (Johnston) - 3:32
6. "Petite Ouverture a Danser" (Erik Satie) - 2:13
7. "A Pear for Satie" - 4:28
8. "Slippin' on a Star" (Johnston) - 4:56
9. "No More Mr. Nice Guy" - 5:21
10. "Der Leiermann" (Franz Schubert) - 3:07
11. "Diggin' Bones" (Johnston) - 4:36
12. "A Goyish Kind of Blue" - 4:51
13. "The Road to Woy Woy" (Johnston) - 4:22
14. "The Needless Kiss" (Johnston) - 4:40
15. "Blue Window" - 3:50

== Personnel ==
- Guy Klucevsek - accordion
- Phillip Johnston - soprano saxophone, alto saxophone
