= Peccadillo =

Peccadillo is derived from the diminutive of the Spanish language word "pecado" meaning sin (although the real diminutive in modern Spanish for "pecado" is "pecadillo", just one "c", not "peccadillo", which sounds more like Italian).

The term may refer to:

- a minor misdemeanor, especially sexual misconduct
- an infraction of an ethical code
- Peccadillos, the third album from American singer-songwriter Susan Herndon
- Peccadillo Pictures, a British film distributor
- Peccadillo at the Palace, the second novel in the Annie Oakley historical mystery series by Kari Bovée
- "Peccadillo," a song by Here Come The Mummies
