= The Microscopic Septet =

American jazz band

The Microscopic Septet is a jazz septet, founded in 1980 by saxophonist Phillip Johnston. They played frequently in New York City, toured, and recorded until they disbanded in 1992. Known affectionately as "The Micros" Heather Phares of Allmusic described them as "one of the most distinctive jazz ensembles in New York during the '80s and early '90s" due to their innovative updating of classic big band styles of the 1930s and '40s.

The band reformed for a few performances in 2006 in conjunction with the reissue of their first four albums, then long out of print, by Cuneiform Records. They performed again in the United States and Europe in December 2007, and have reunited for performances in New York City almost every year since, most recently at The Kitchen in Manhattan (12/9/17). Since reforming The Microscopic Septet have released four albums all on Cuneiform, most recently Been Up So Long It Looks Like Down To Me: The Micros Play The Blues.

They are known for performing the theme song for NPR's Fresh Air program, which was composed by pianist Joel Forrester.

== Members ==
| | 1980 | 1981 | ca 1981-1983 | 1983-2007 | 2007–present |
|---|---|---|---|---|---|
| soprano saxophone | Phillip Johnston | | | | |
| piano | Joel Forrester | | | | |
| alto saxophone | John Zorn | | Don Davis | | |
| tenor saxophone | George Bishop | John Hagen | | Paul Shapiro | Michael Hashim |
| baritone saxophone | Dave Sewelson | | | | |
| double bass, tuba | David Hofstra | | | | |
| drums | Bobby DeMeo | Richard Dworkin | | | |

== Discography ==
- Take the Z Train (1983) Press Records
- Let's Flip! (1985) Osmosis Records
- Off Beat Glory (1986) Osmosis Records
- Beauty Based on Science (1988) Stash Records
- Seven Men in Neckties: The History of the Micros, Vol. 1 (2006) Cuneiform Records (includes Z Train and Let's Flip along with previously unreleased material)
- Surrealistic Swing: The History of the Micros, Vol. 2 (2006) Cuneiform Records (includes Off Beat Glory and Beauty Based on Science along with previously unreleased material)
- Lobster Leaps In (2008) Cuneiform Records
- Friday the Thirteenth: The Micros Play Monk (2010) Cuneiform Records
- Manhattan Moonrise (2014) Cuneiform Records
- Been Up So Long It Looks Like Down To Me: The Micros Play The Blues (2017) Cuneiform Records

== See also ==
- List of experimental big bands
