= Joel Forrester =

American jazz composer and pianist

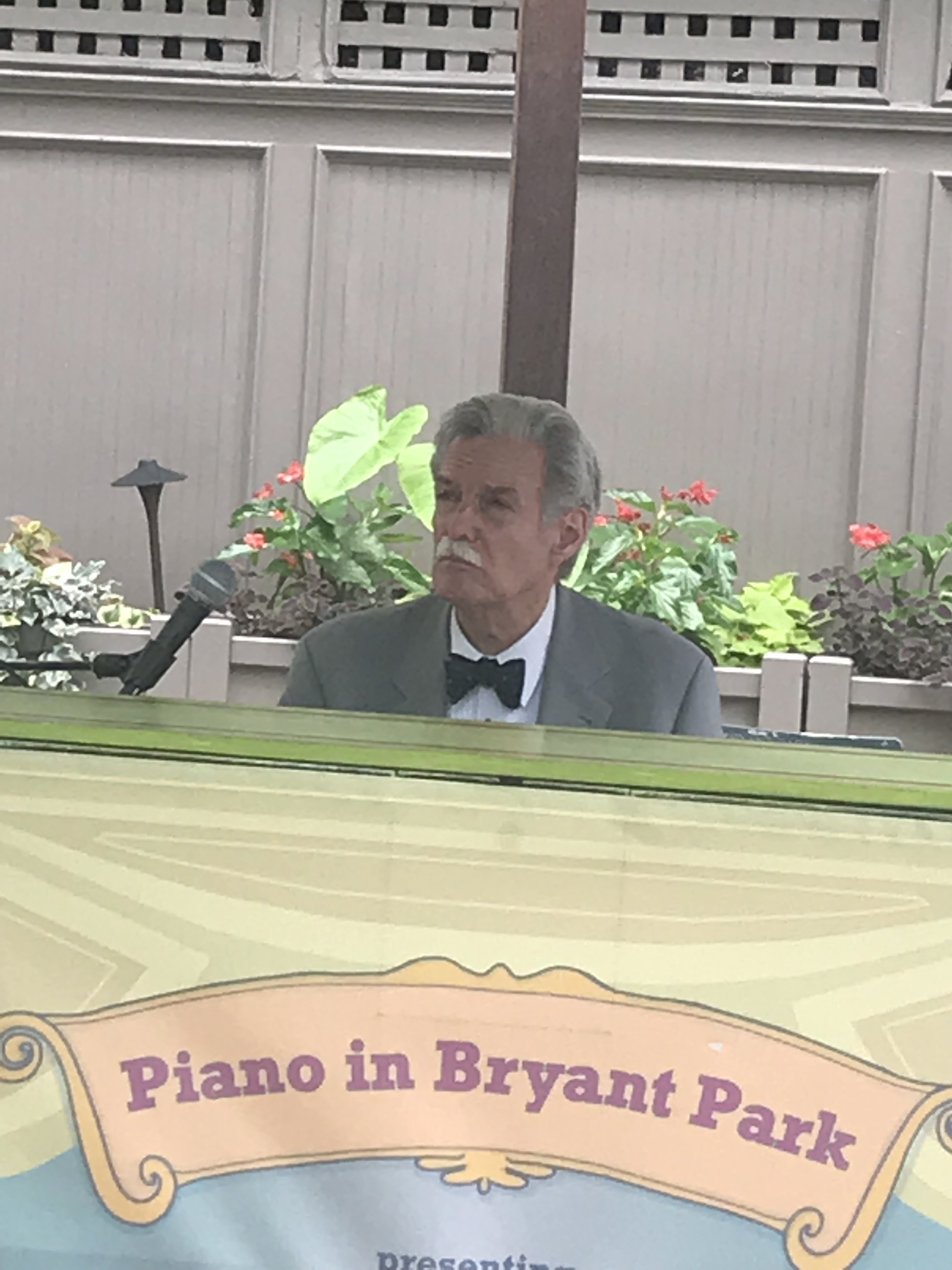
Forrester in 2019

Joel Forrester (born May 2, 1946) is an American jazz composer and pianist. He composed the theme song to NPR's Fresh Air, performed by The Microscopic Septet which Forrester founded in 1980 and led with saxophonist Phillip Johnston. A documentary film about Joel Forrester was made in 2014 entitled Embracing Dissonance: A Life in Bebop. The one-hour and five-minute documentary is an exploration of his diverse musical talents and influences. Forrester recounts previously unknown aspects of the life of Thelonious Monk and the Jazz Baroness, Pannonica Rothschild. The film also explores bebop's origins in the Harlem jazz club Minton's, Forrester's work as a composer of African American church music, as an improv accompanist for silent movies, and as a teacher of jazz musical forms. Forrester's story plays out like a jazz tune: a strong theme runs through a series of improvisational changes, solo riffs, and ensemble resolutions to weave the fabric of a bebop life.

== Biography ==
Forrester furnished music for the early films of Andy Warhol. Forrester was a draft resister and served six months in prison.

In the 1970s, following several years on Federal parole, Forrester moved to New York City, where he has lived and worked ever since. In the late 1970s, Joel was introduced to Thelonious Monk by a friend, Baroness Pannonica de Koenigswarter.

With Phillip Johnston, Forrester co-founded the Microscopic Septet in 1980; he played with the band for 12 years. When in Paris, he developed a reputation as an accompanist to silent films, including performances at The Louvre, and the Musée d'Orsay.

Back in New York, Joel founded the quartet "People Like Us", featuring Claire Daly on baritone saxophone.

In addition to the theme to Fresh Air, Forrester's compositions include the off-Broadway satire Fascist Living.

== Discography ==
=== As leader ===
- Stop the Music (Koch, 1997)
- In Heaven (Koch, 1997)
- Ever Wonder Why (Ride Symbol, 2004)
- Live at the Hillside Club (Asynchronous, 2011)
- French Quintet (2012)

=== As sideman ===
With The Microscopic Septet

- Take the Z Train (Press, 1983)
- Let's Flip! (Osmosis, 1985)
- Off Beat Glory (Osmosis, 1986)
- Beauty Based On Science! (Stash, 1988)
- Lobster Leaps in (Cuneiform, 2008)
- Friday the 13th (Cuneiform, 2011)
- Been Up So Long It Looks Like Down to Me (Cuneiform, 2017)

With others

- Michael Callen, Purple Heart (Significant Other, 1988)
- Michael Callen, Legacy (Significant Other, 1996)
- Michael Hearst, Songs for Unusual Creatures (Urban Geek, 2012)
- Phillip Johnston, Music for Films (Tzadik, 1998)
