= Reader's Digest =

American general-interest magazine

- Cover of the November 2022 issue
- Chief Content Officer: Jason Buhrmester
- Frequency: Monthly
- Format: Digest
- Total circulation: 3,029,039 (2020)
- Founder: DeWitt Wallace; Lila Bell Wallace
- First issue: February 5, 1922; 104 years ago
- Company: Trusted Media Brands, Inc.
- Country: United States
- Based in: Manhattan, New York City, New York, U.S.
- Website: www.rd.com
- ISSN: 0034-0375

Reader's Digest is an American general-interest family magazine, published six times a year. Formerly based in Chappaqua, New York, it is now headquartered in midtown Manhattan. The magazine was founded in 1922 by DeWitt Wallace and his wife Lila Bell Wallace. For many years, Reader's Digest was the best-selling consumer magazine in the United States; it lost that distinction in 2009 to Better Homes and Gardens. According to Media Mark Research (2006), Reader's Digest reached more readers with household incomes of over $100,000 than Fortune, The Wall Street Journal, Business Week, and Inc. combined.

Global editions of Reader's Digest reach an additional 40 million people in more than 70 countries, via 49 editions in 21 languages. The periodical has a global circulation of 10.5 million, making it the largest paid-circulation magazine in the world.

It is also published in Braille, digital, and audio editions, and in a large-type edition called "Reader's Digest Large Print". The magazine is compact—its pages are roughly half the size of most American magazines. In summer 2005, the company adopted the slogan "America in your pocket" for the U.S. edition. In January 2008, however, it changed the slogan to "Life well shared".

== History ==
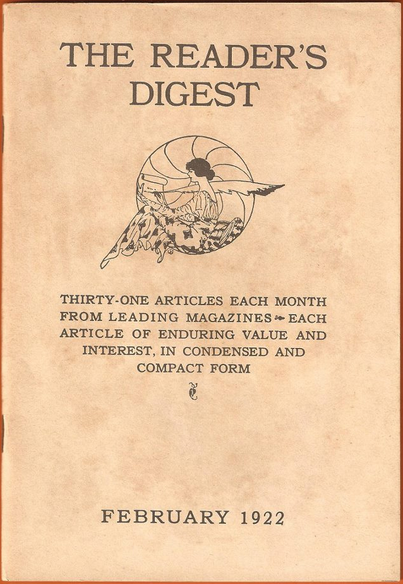
First issue of the Reader's Digest, February 1922

=== Inception and growth ===
In 1920, Dewitt Wallace married Lila Bell Wallace in Pleasantville, New York. Shortly thereafter, the two would launch Reader's Digest in the basement below a Greenwich Village speakeasy. The idea for Reader's Digest was to gather a sampling of favorite articles on many subjects from various monthly magazines, sometimes condensing and rewriting them, and to combine them into one magazine.

In the 20th century, Reader's Digest maintained a conservative and anti-Communist perspective on political and social issues. The Wallaces initially hoped the journal could provide $5,000 of net income. Wallace's assessment of what the potential mass-market audience wanted to read led to rapid growth. By 1929, the magazine had 290,000 subscribers and had a gross income of $900,000 a year. The first international edition was published in the United Kingdom in 1938. By the 40th anniversary of Reader's Digest, it had 40 international editions, in 13 languages and Braille, and at one point, it was the largest-circulating journal in China, Mexico, Spain, Sweden, Peru, and other countries, with a total international circulation of 23 million.

The first "Word Power" column of the magazine was published in the January 1945 edition, written by Wilfred J. Funk. In December 1952, the magazine published "Cancer by the Carton", a series of articles that linked smoking with lung cancer.

From 2002 to 2006, Reader's Digest conducted a vocabulary competition in schools throughout the US called Reader's Digest National Word Power Challenge. In 2007, the magazine said it would not have the competition for the 2007–08 school year: "...but rather to use the time to evaluate the program in every respect, including scope, mission, and model for implementation."

In 2006, the magazine published three more local-language editions in Slovenia, Croatia, and Romania. In October 2007, the Digest expanded into Serbia. The magazine's licensee in Italy stopped publishing in December 2007. The magazine launched in the People's Republic of China in January 2008. It ceased publishing in China in 2012, due to a lack of sales caused by a relatively high price, a poorly defined audience and low-quality translated content.

For 2010, the US edition of the magazine reduced its publishing schedule to 10 times a year rather than 12, and to increase digital offerings. It also cut its circulation guarantee for advertisers to 5.5 million copies from 8 million. In announcing that decision, in June 2009, the company said that it planned to reduce its number of celebrity profiles and how-to features, and increase the number of inspiring spiritual stories and stories about the military.

Beginning in January 2013, the US edition was increased to 12 times a year.

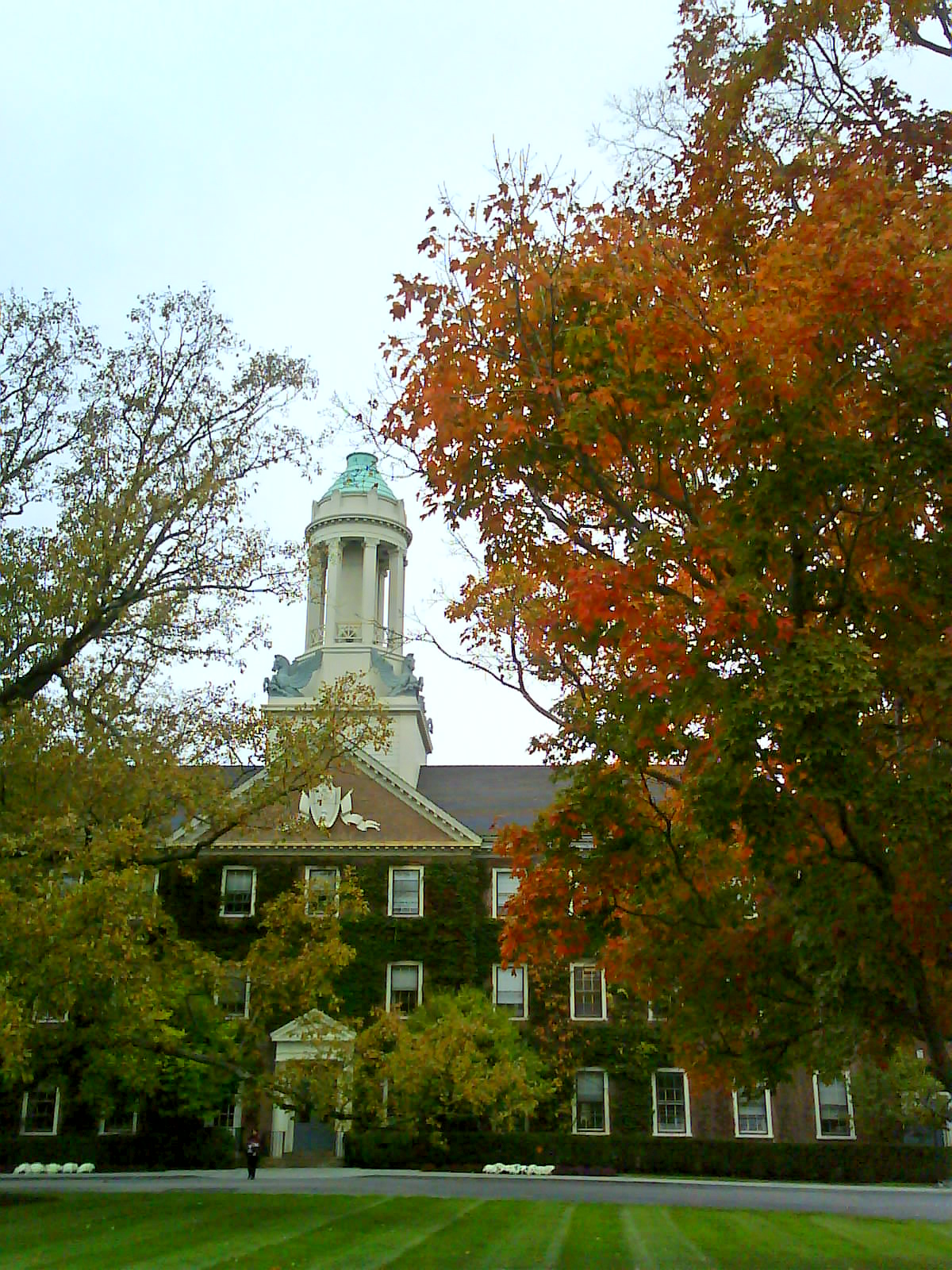
Former Reader's Digest building in Chappaqua, New York

Its current frequency of publication is 6 times a year.

=== Business organization and ownership ===
By the 1950s the Reader's Digest executive leadership included the Editor, Executive Editor, Managing Editors, Book Department, General Business Manager and Director, International Editions. There were several levels of editorial staff including Seniors Editors, Department Editors, Roving Editors, and Associate Editors.

In 1990, the magazine's parent company, The Reader's Digest Association, Inc. (RDA), became a publicly traded corporation. From 2005 through 2010, RDA reported a net loss each year.

In March 2007, Ripplewood Holdings LLC led a consortium of private-equity investors who bought the company through a leveraged buyout for US$2.8 billion, financed primarily by the issuance of US$2.2 billion of debt. Ripplewood invested $275 million of its own money, and had partners including Rothschild Bank of Zürich and GoldenTree Asset Management of New York. The private-equity deal tripled the association's interest payments, to $148 million a year.

On August 24, 2009, RDA announced it had filed with the US Bankruptcy court an arranged Chapter 11 bankruptcy to continue operations, and to restructure the US$2.2 billion debt undertaken by the leveraged buyout transaction. The company emerged from bankruptcy with the lenders exchanging debt for equity, and Ripplewood's entire equity investment was extinguished.

In April 2010, the UK arm was sold to its management. It has a licensing deal with the US company to continue publishing the UK edition. The closure of the UK edition was announced in April 2024.

On February 17, 2013, RDA Holding filed for bankruptcy a second time. The company was purchased for £1 by Mike Luckwell, a venture capitalist and once the biggest shareholder in WPP plc.

== Direct marketing ==
RDA offers many mail-order products included with "sweepstakes" or contests. US Reader's Digest and the company's other US magazines do not use sweepstakes in their direct-mail promotions. A notable shift to electronic direct marketing has been undertaken by the company to adapt to shifting media landscape. In the mid-20th century, phonograph record albums of popular classical and easy-listening music, bearing the magazine's name, were sold by mail. Reader's Digest also partnered with RCA to offer a mail-order music club which offered discount pricing on vinyl records.

== Sweepstakes agreement ==
In 2001, 32 states' attorneys general reached agreements with the company and other sweepstakes operators to settle allegations that they tricked the elderly into buying products because they were a "guaranteed winner" of a lottery. The settlement required the companies to expand the type size of notices in the packaging that no purchase is necessary to play the sweepstakes, and to:

1. Establish a "Do Not Contact List" and refrain from soliciting any future "high-activity" customers unless and until Reader's Digest actually makes contact with that customer and determines that the customer is not buying because they believe that the purchase will improve their chances of winning.
2. Send letters to individuals who spend more than $1,000 in a six-month period telling them that they are not required to make purchases to win the sweepstakes, that making a purchase will not improve their chances of winning, and that all entries have the same chance to win whether or not the entry is accompanied by a purchase.

The UK edition of Reader's Digest has also been criticized by the Trading Standards Institute for preying on the elderly and vulnerable with misleading bulk mailings that claim the recipient is guaranteed a large cash prize and advising them not to discuss this with anyone else. Following their complaint, the Advertising Standards Authority said they would be launching an investigation. The ASA investigation upheld the complaint in 2008, ruling that the Reader's Digest mailing was irresponsible and misleading (particularly for the elderly) and had breached three clauses of the Committee of Advertising Practice code. Reader's Digest was told not to use this mailing again.

== International editions ==
The list is sorted by year of first publication.

- 1938 – United Kingdom (sold in 2010, operated under license), closed April 2024
- 1940 – Cuba and Latin America (in Spanish) (as Selecciones)
- 1942 – Brazil
- 1943 – Sweden, Egypt (in Arabic) (Al-Mukhtar)
- 1945 – Finland
- 1946 – Australia, Denmark, Japan (operations discontinued in 1985)
- 1947 – Belgium (in French), France, Norway, Canadian French (discontinued in 2024)
- 1948 – Canada (English, discontinued in 2024), Germany, South Africa, Switzerland (in French and German), Italy (operations discontinued in 2007)
- 1950 – Argentina, New Zealand (ceased print in 2025)
- 1952 – Austria, Spain (as Selecciones in Spain)
- 1954 – India and Pakistan (in English)
- 1957 – Netherlands
- 1959 – Chile, Costa Rica and Central America
- 1965 – Taiwan, Hong Kong and Southeast Asia (in traditional Chinese)(operations discontinued in 2025)
- 1968 – Belgium (Dutch)
- 1971 – Puerto Rico and United States (in Spanish), Portugal
- 1978 – South Korea (operations discontinued in 2009)
- 1982 – Greece (discontinued, probably in 1986)
- 1991 – Hungary, Russia
- 1993 – Czech Republic (operations discontinued in 2017)
- 1995 – Poland (operations discontinued in 2017)
- 1996 – Thailand (operations discontinued in 2014)
- 1997 – Slovakia
- 2004 – Indonesia (operations discontinued in October 2015)
- 2005 – Romania, Slovenia, Croatia, Bulgaria
- 2007 – Bosnia and Herzegovina, Serbia, Ukraine
- 2008 – China (operations discontinued in 2012)

=== United Kingdom edition ===
The United Kingdom edition first published in 1938. Decades later Reader's Digest UK went into administration in 2010 due a £125 million pension fund deficit. Private equity fund Better Capital paid around £14 million for the brand and invested a further £9 million into the business. Better Capital sold Reader's Digest UK in 2013 for a nominal fee to venture capitalist Mike Luckwell. The brand was sold again in 2018 to its former chief executive Gary Hopkins. The magazine ceased publication after 86 years in April 2024.

=== Arabic editions ===
The first Reader's Digest publication in the Arab World was printed in Egypt in September 1943.

=== Canadian edition ===
On December 6, 2023, it was announced that Reader's Digest Canada would cease publication in the spring of 2024.

=== Indian edition ===
The Indian edition was first published in 1954. Its circulation then was 40,000 copies. It was published for many years by the Tata Group of companies. Today, the magazine is published in India by Living Media India Ltd, and sold over 600,000. It prints Indian and international articles. According to the Indian Readership Survey Round II of 2009, the readership for Reader's Digest was 3.94 million, second only to India Today at 5.62 million.

=== Australian edition ===
According to readership estimates by Roy Morgan, Reader's Digest Australia had an average readership per issue of 362,000 as at September 2023.

== Books ==
Nonfiction books with the Reader's Digest brand and yearly collections of the magazine's content are currently published by Trusted Media Brands, sold through their website and distributed to retailers by Simon & Schuster.

Since 1950, Reader's Digest has published a direct mail series of hardcover anthologies containing abridged novels and nonfiction. The series was originally called Reader's Digest Condensed Books and renamed in 1997 to Reader's Digest Select Editions.

From the mid-1960s to early 1980s, full-length, original works of non-fiction were published under the imprint Reader's Digest Press and distributed by Thomas Y. Crowell Co. Beginning in 1982, a series of classic novels was published as World's Best Reading and made available by mail order to magazine subscribers.

In Germany, Reader's Digest runs its own book-publishing house called Verlag Das Beste which not only publishes the German edition of the Reader's Digest magazine. Since 1955, it has published Reader's Digest Auswahlbücher (a German edition of Reader's Digest Condensed Books). Besides publishing the magazine, the publisher is especially well known in Germany for the science fiction anthology Unterwegs in die Welt von Morgen ("The Road to Tomorrow"), consisting of 50 hardcover volumes of classic science fiction novels (such as Robert A. Heinlein's Stranger in a Strange Land, Arthur C. Clarke's 2001, or Ray Bradbury's Fahrenheit 451, usually two novels per volume) published between 1986 and 1995.

== Editors-in-chief ==
1. Lila Bell Wallace and DeWitt Wallace (1922–1964) (original founders)
2. Hobart D. Lewis (1964–1976)
3. Edward T. Thompson (1976–1984)
4. Kenneth O. Gilmore (1984–1990)
5. Kenneth Tomlinson (1990–1996)
6. Christopher Willcox (1996–2000)
7. Eric Schrier (2000–2001)
8. Jacqueline Leo (2001–2007)
9. Peggy Northrop (2007–2011)
10. Liz Vaccariello (2011–2016)
11. Bruce Kelley (2016–2021)
12. Jason Buhrmester (2021–present)

== Adaptations ==
Content from Reader's Digest was used as the basis of episodes of Radio Reader's Digest and TV Reader's Digest.

== See also ==
- World's Best Reading
- List of United States magazines
- John Patric, noted writer for Reader's Digest during the 1930s and 1940s
- "My Last Wonderful Days", a 1956 article about an Iowa woman dying from cancer
- Duzhe, Chinese version of Reader's Digest, and used the exact same magazine name in Chinese between 1981 and 1993

== Bibliography ==
- John Bainbridge, Little Wonder. Or, the Reader's Digest and How It Grew, New York: Reynal & Hitchcock, 1945.
- John Heidenry, Theirs Was the Kingdom: Lila and DeWitt Wallace and the Story of the Reader's Digest, New York/London: W.W. Norton, 1993
- Samuel A. Schreiner, The Condensed World of the Reader's Digest, New York: Stein and Day, 1977.
- James Playsted Wood, Of Lasting Interest: The Story of the Reader's Digest, Westport, Connecticut: Greenwood Press, 1958.
- Clem Robyns, "The Internationalisation of Social and Cultural Values: On the Homogenization and Localization Strategies of the Reader's Digest", Folia Translatologica 3, 1994, 83–92
- Joanne P. Sharp, Condensing the Cold War: Reader's Digest and American Identity, University of Minnesota Press, 2000.
- Joanne P. Sharp, Hegemony, popular culture and geopolitics: the Reader's Digest and the construction of danger, Political Geography, Elsevier, 1996.
- Visnja Milidragovic, "From direct marketing tool to digital niche product: a Reader's Digest Sweepstakes case study", SFU, 2012.
