= WBHB (AM) =

Fitzgerald, Georgia; United States
- Frequency: 1240 kHz

Programming
- Format: Oldies

Ownership
- Owner: Broadcast South, LLC
- Sister stations: WRDO; WDMG; WPNG; WKZZ; WVOH-FM; WHJD

History
- First air date: 1946
- Last air date: March 29, 2018
- Call sign meaning: "Welcome Back Home Boys"

Technical information
- Facility ID: 39476
- Class: C
- Power: 1,000 watts unlimited
- Transmitter coordinates: 31°42′22.7″N 83°15′41.6″W

WBHB (1240 AM) was a radio station broadcasting an oldies format. Licensed to Fitzgerald, Georgia, United States, the station was owned by Broadcast South, LLC. The call letters were chosen in the mid-1940s to represent "Welcome Back Home Boys" in recognition of the soldiers who were returning home from World War II.

== Sign-off ==
After the Federal Communications Commission (FCC) received a complaint in February 2018 that WBHB was not operating, Broadcast South admitted that it was only operating "approximately once per week". The station's transmitter caused "very significant interference" to co-located stations WKZZ and WRDO and electronic devices in the studio building, and several engineers were unable to determine the cause. Broadcast South turned in WBHB's license on March 23, 2018, and it was deleted from the FCC's database effective March 29, 2018.
