= WVOH =

WVOH may refer to:

- WVOH-FM, a radio station (93.5 FM) licensed to serve Hazlehurst, Georgia, United States
- WGTM (Spindale, North Carolina), a radio station (1520 AM) which held the call sign WVOH from 2012 to 2014
- WHJD, a radio station (920 AM) licensed to serve Hazlehurst, Georgia, which held the call sign WVOH until 2011
