= WGTM =

WGTM may refer to:

- WGTM (Spindale, North Carolina), a defunct radio station (1520 AM) formerly licensed to serve Spindale, North Carolina, United States
- WGTM (Wilson, North Carolina), a defunct radio station (590 AM) formerly licensed to serve Wilson, North Carolina
