= WDMG =

WDMG may refer to:

- WDMG (AM), a radio station (860 AM) licensed to Douglas, Georgia, United States
- WDMG-FM, a radio station (97.9 FM) licensed to Ambrose, Georgia, United States
