= WOKA =

WOKA can refer to:

- WOKA (AM), a radio station (1310 AM) licensed to Douglas, Georgia, United States
- WOKA-FM, a radio station (106.7 FM) licensed to Douglas, Georgia, United States
