= Moejadkatebarry =

EP by Moe Tucker
- Released: June 1987
- Recorded: Flipside Studio (Longwood, Florida)
- Genres: Alternative pop; rock
- Label: 50 Skidillion Watts
- Producer: Jad Fair

Moe Tucker chronology
Playin' Possum (1985)	Moejadkatebarry (1987)	Life in Exile After Abdication (1989)

Professional ratings
Review scores
Source	Rating
AllMusic	link
Robert Christgau	B+

MoeJadKateBarry is an extended play (EP) by American musician Moe Tucker, released in June 1987 by 50 Skidillion Watts. The title refers to Tucker and the members of her backing band. It's composed of a mixture of re-recordings of recently released outtakes from the Velvet Underground's mid years (1967–1968), cover versions of songs from the 1950s–1960s, (notably a 1967 song featuring writing from Velvet Underground members John Cale and Lou Reed), and a singular new composition.

Tucker is credited as a co-writer on 3 of the EPs 5 tracks, and the featured players are all members of Half Japanese.

== Track listing ==
Side One
No.	Title	Writer(s)	Length
1.	"Guess I'm Falling In Love"	Moe Tucker, John Cale, Sterling Morrison, Lou Reed	4:28
2.	"Baby, What You Want To Do" (Ft. David Fair)	Jimmy Reed	2:44
3.	"Jad Is A Fink" (Ft. John Dreyfuss)	Tucker, Barry Stock, Kate Messer	1:36
Total length:			8:48

Side Two
No.	Title	Writer(s)	Length
4.	"Why Don't You Smile Now?"	Cale, L. Reed, Jerry Vance, Terry Philips	2:23
5.	"Hey, Mr. Rain" (Ft. Mark Jickling)	Tucker, Cale, Morrison, L. Reed	4:06
Total length:			6:29

== Personnel ==
MoeJadKateBarry

- Moe Tucker – drums, backing vocals
- Jad Fair – lead vocals
- Kate Messer – guitar
- Barry Stock – bass, lead guitar

Guest Musicians

- Mark Jickling – guitar on "Hey Mr. Rain"
- David Fair – harmonica on "Baby What You Want Me to Do"
- John Dreyfuss – saxophone on "Jad is a Fink"
