= Willis Crockett =

American football player (born 1966)

No. 90
- Position: Linebacker

Personal information
- Born: August 25, 1966 (age 60); Douglas, Georgia, U.S.
- Listed height: 6 ft 3 in (1.91 m)
- Listed weight: 234 lb (106 kg)

Career information
- High school: Coffee (Douglas)
- College: Georgia Tech
- NFL draft: 1989: 5th round, 119th overall pick

Career history
- Dallas Cowboys (1989–1990)

Awards and highlights
- First-team All-ACC (1988)

Career NFL statistics
- Games played: 13
- Stats at Pro Football Reference

Willis Robert Crockett (born August 25, 1966) is an American former professional football player who was a linebacker in the National Football League (NFL) for the Dallas Cowboys. He was selected in the fifth round of the 1989 NFL draft. He played college football for the Georgia Tech Yellow Jackets.

== Early life ==
Crockett attended Coffee County High School, where he played as a defensive back and wide receiver. He also practiced baseball and basketball.

He accepted a football scholarship from Georgia Tech. As a freshman, he was named a starter at safety, registering 47 tackles and 2 interceptions, including one returned for a touchdown against the University of Tennessee at Chattanooga and earned freshman All-American honors.

As a sophomore, he was converted into an outside linebacker and earned a starting position. He collected 55 tackles (5 for loss) and 2 quarterback hurries.

As a junior, he required arthroscopic surgery before the season, to fix a knee injury that limited him from the previous year. He tallied 57 tackles, one sack and led the team with 6 tackles for loss.

As a senior, he was a part of a defense that ranked 14th in the nation with 384.2 total yards allowed per game and seventh in passing with 138.9 yards allowed. He posted 67 tackles, 6 sacks (second on the team), 14 quarterback pressures (led the team), 4 tackles for loss (second on the team) and 3 fumble recoveries (tied for the team lead). He also received All-ACC and honorable-mention All-American honors.

== Professional career ==
Crockett was selected by the Dallas Cowboys in the fifth round (119th overall) of the 1989 NFL draft. As a rookie, he tore his left anterior cruciate ligament during training camp and was placed on the injured reserve list on August 28.

In 1990, he was an early training camp surprise, but was slowed by a sprained ankle and waived injured on September 3. He was re-signed on September 12, to be a backup middle linebacker and also play on special teams. He appeared in 13 games, registering 9 defensive tackles, including 4 in his first regular season game against the New York Giants on September 16. He was released before the start of the 1991 season.
