= I Spent a Week There the Other Night =

Studio album by Moe Tucker
- Released: 1991
- Studio: Toxic Shock (New York City)
- Genre: Punk rock
- Length: 44:40
- Label: New Rose
- Producer: Maureen Tucker

Moe Tucker chronology
Life in Exile After Abdication (1989)	I Spent a Week There the Other Night (1991)	Dogs Under Stress (1994)

I Spent a Week There the Other Night is the third solo studio album by the American musician Moe Tucker, released in 1991 by New Rose.

Included on the album is a cover version of "Then He Kissed Me", originally by the Crystals, as well as a cover of the Velvet Underground's song "I'm Waiting for the Man". I Spent a Week There the Other Night was reissued in 1994.

== Production ==
The album has performances by members of the Velvet Underground, including Lou Reed, Sterling Morrison and John Cale. All four original Velvets play together on "I'm Not", making it their only studio collaboration on original material since 1968. Members of Violent Femmes also contributed to the album. Tucker stuck mostly to rhythm guitar.

== Critical reception ==
Professional ratings
Review scores
Source	Rating
AllMusic	4.5/5 stars
Chicago Sun-Times	3/4 stars
Orlando Sentinel	3/5 stars

The Orlando Sentinel wrote that "the basement minimalism is perfect for her ingenuous songs and flat but expressive vocals." Trouser Press praised "Lazy", writing that, "for a 46-year-old mother of five, 'Lazy' is pure punk perfection."

== Track listing ==
All songs written and arranged by Maureen Tucker except where noted.

1. "Fired Up" – 4:01
2. "That's B.A.D." – 4:58
3. "Lazy" – 2:28
4. "S.O.S." – 3:12
5. "Blue, All the Way to Canada" (Tucker, Jim Turner) – 3:52
6. "(And) Then He Kissed Me" (Jeff Barry, Ellie Greenwich, Phil Spector) – 2:31
7. "Too Shy" – 3:35
8. "Stayin' Put" – 4:23
9. "Baby, Honey, Sweetie" – 3:18
10. "I'm Not" – 6:55
11. "I'm Waiting for the Man" (Lou Reed) – 5:27

== Personnel ==
- Maureen Tucker – bass, guitar, percussion, vocals, production, mixing
- John Sluggett – drums
- Sonny Vincent – guitar
- Daniel Hutchens – guitar
- Sterling Morrison – electric guitar on "Too Shy", 12-string guitar on "Blue, All the Way to Canada"
- Victor DeLorenzo – drums
- Brian Ritchie – bass
- Lou Reed – guitar on "Fired Up" and "I'm Not"
- Jim Morris – trumpet
- Michelle Saacks – piano
- John Cale – synthesizer on "I'm Waiting for the Man", viola on "(And) Then He Kissed Me" and "I'm Not"
- Dorothy Dargan - vocals
- David Doris - saxophone
- Don Fleming - guitar
- Arlene Levin - vocals
- Martha Morrison - vocals
