= WPNG =

WPNG may refer to:

- WPNG (FM), a radio station (101.9 FM) licensed to Pearson, Georgia, United States
- WPNG-LP, a defunct low-power television station (channel 3) formerly licensed to Pearson, Georgia
