= Trevis Simpson =

American basketball player (born 1991)

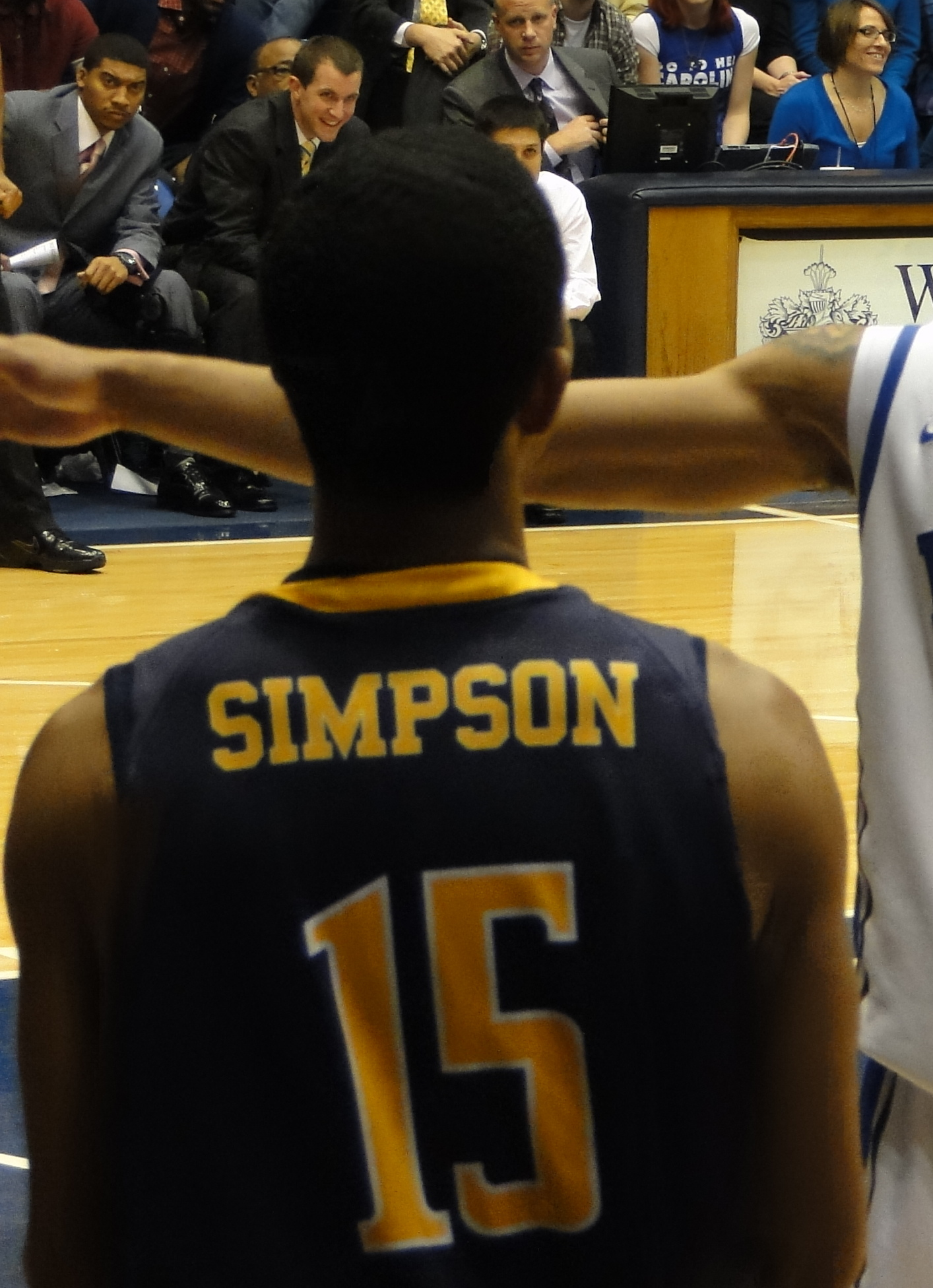
- Simpson playing for UNC Greensboro

Personal information
- Born: September 5, 1991 (age 35) Douglas, Georgia, U.S.
- Listed height: 6 ft 4 in (1.93 m)
- Listed weight: 185 lb (84 kg)

Career information
- High school: Coffee (Douglas, Georgia)
- College: UNC Greensboro (2010–2013)
- NBA draft: 2013: undrafted
- Playing career: 2013–2023
- Position: Shooting guard / small forward

Career history
- 2013–2014: Kolossos Rodou
- 2014–2015: Rethymno
- 2015–2016: Kataja
- 2016–2017: Hyères-Toulon
- 2017: Blackwater Elite
- 2017–2018: Alba Fehérvár
- 2018–2019: Udine
- 2019–2020: Rasta Vechta
- 2020–2021: Gaziantep
- 2021: Brose Bamberg
- 2021–2023: Promitheas Patras
- 2023: Fuerza Regia de Monterrey

Career highlights
- 2× First-team All-SoCon (2012, 2013); SoCon All-Freshman Team (2011)

Trevis JeMar Simpson (born September 5, 1991) is an American former professional basketball player. He played college basketball for the University of North Carolina at Greensboro.

== High school career ==
Simpson attended Coffee High School in Douglas, Georgia where he was rated a top 100 recruit. As a junior in 2008–09, he averaged 16 points per game. He graduated from Coffee in 2010 and left as a three-time all-region selection.

== College career ==
As a freshman at UNC Greensboro in 2010–11, Simpson was named to the Southern Conference All-Freshman team by both the coaches and media. He was the Spartans' second-leading scorer and played in 27 games with nine starts. Various injuries and illness led to Simpson missing time during the season. He finished with averages of 11.8 points and 3.6 rebounds in 23.0 minutes per game.

As a sophomore in 2011–12, Simpson was named first-team All-Southern Conference by the media, All-SoCon by the coaches, and second-team All-State by the NCCSIA, as well as first-team All-District 22 by the NABC. He led the team and the SoCon in scoring at 18.3 points per game, becoming the first Spartan all-time to lead the conference in scoring. He started all 30 games he played and also averaged 4.2 rebounds in 27.8 minutes per game.

As a junior in 2012–13, Simpson played in 29 of 31 games, including 26 starts. He was named first-team All-Southern Conference by both the league's coaches and media members, and led the Southern Conference in scoring for the second straight season, averaging 18.7 points per game. He became the first player in the SoCon since Stephen Curry to lead the league in scoring in consecutive seasons. Over three seasons with the Spartans, he scored 1,407 points to rank seventh on the school's all-time scoring list. Simpson also averaged 4.2 rebounds and 1.4 assists in 29.6 minutes per game.

On March 27, 2013, Simpson announced his decision to forgo his senior season to pursue a professional basketball career.

== Professional career ==
On August 18, 2013, Simpson signed with Kolossos Rodou of Greece for the 2013–14 season. In 23 games for the club, he averaged 6.5 points and 2.5 rebounds per game.

On August 30, 2014, Simpson signed with Rethymno Aegean for the 2014–15 season. In 21 games for the club, he averaged 10.2 points and 3.7 rebounds per game.

In September 2015, Simpson signed with Kataja Basket of Finland for the 2015–16 season. In 39 games for the club, he averaged 18.5 points, 3.8 rebounds and 2.5 assists per game.

In July 2016, Simpson signed a contract on a one-year deal with Hyères Toulon Var Basket in France.

He joined Alba Fehérvár in 2017 and averaged 14.6 points, 3.9 rebounds and 3 assists per game. On July 5, 2018, Simpson signed with the Italian club Apu Gsa Udine.

On July 14, 2020, he signed with Gaziantep Basketbol of the Turkish Basketbol Süper Ligi (BSL). Simpson averaged 12.3 points and 1.6 assists per game.

On July 14, 2021, he signed with Brose Bamberg of the Basketball Bundesliga. In 8 games, he averaged 10 points, 1.8 rebounds and 0.8 assists per contest.

On December 30, 2021, Simpson returned to Greece, signing with EuroCup side Promitheas Patras for the rest of the season. In 23 league games, he averaged 10.7 points, 3.9 rebounds, 1.8 assists and 1 steal, playing around 29 minutes per contest.

On June 29, 2022, Simpson renewed his contract with the Greek club. In 15 domestic league matches, he averaged 8.3 points and 2.3 rebounds, playing around 26 minutes per contest.
