= First Methodist Church (Douglas, Georgia) =

Coordinates: 31°30′42″N 82°50′59″W

Douglas First Methodist Church
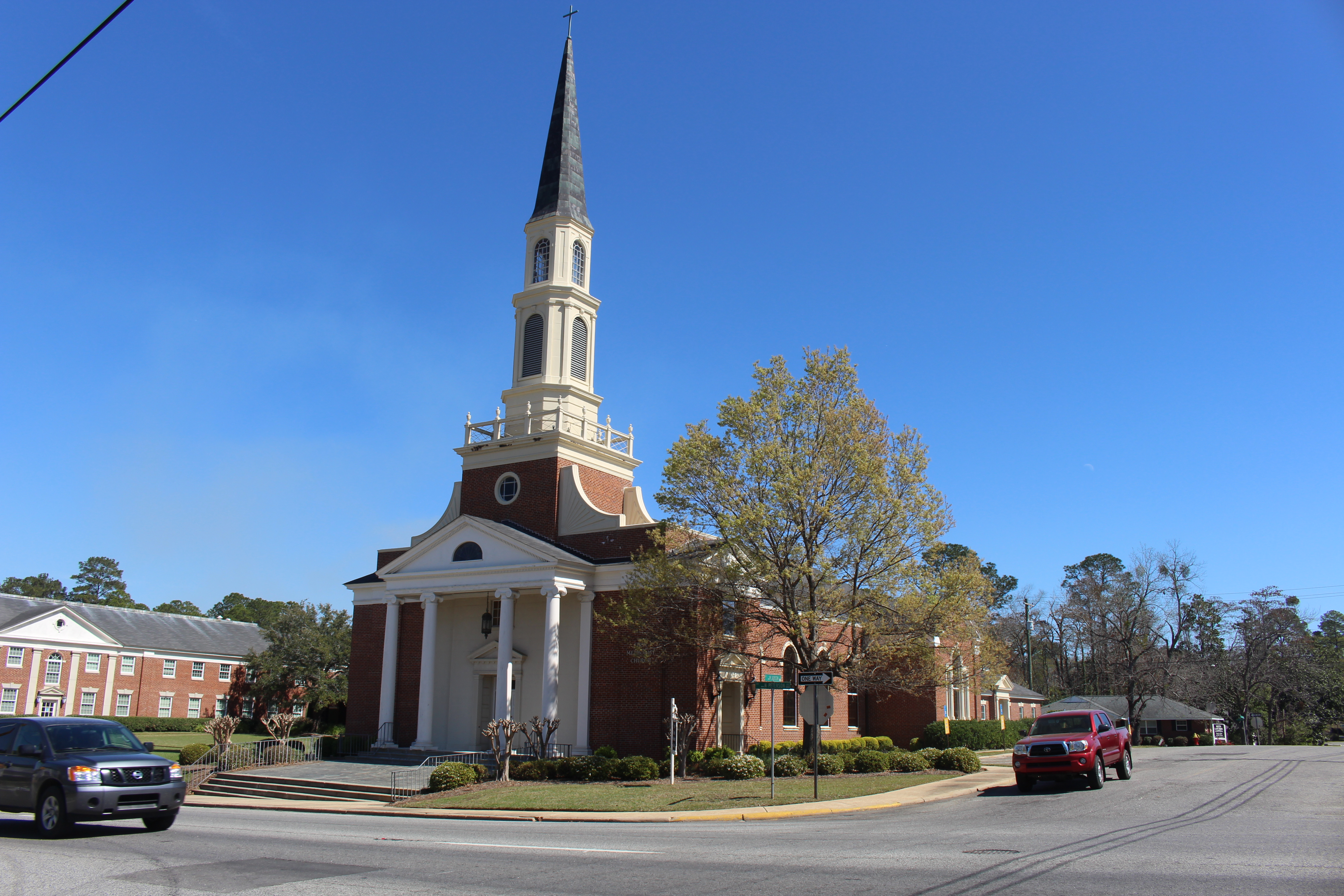
- Douglas First Methodist Church pictured in 2017.
- Douglas First Methodist Church
- Country: United States
- Denomination: Global Methodist Church
- Website: douglasfirst.com

History
- Former name: First United Methodist Church
- Founded: August 1888

Architecture
- Style: Neoclassical

Specifications
- Materials: Brick

Clergy
- Pastor: Paul Elliott

Douglas First Methodist Church was founded in Douglas, Georgia in August 1888.

== History ==
The early history of Douglas First United Methodist Church was published in A Centennial History by Elizabeth Lott and others in 1988.

In May 2023, the church disaffiliated from the United Methodist Church's South Georgia Conference and joined the Global Methodist Church.
