= Modern Pop Classics =

Single by Maureen Tucker and Friends / Count Viglione & Lady Carolyn
- A-side: "I'm Sticking With You" (Maureen Tucker & Friends)
- B-side: "Of Yesterday" (Count Viglione & Lady Carolyn)
- Released: 1980
- Recorded: February 24, 1974 at Music Designers, Boston, New York (Side One)
- Genre: Alternative pop
- Length: 2:13 (A) / 2:45 (B)
- Label: Varulven
- Songwriter(s): Lou Reed (A) / Joseph Allen Viglione (B)

Maureen Tucker singles chronology
| "Modern Pop Classics" (1980) | ""Around and Around" / Will You Love Me Tomorrow?" (1981) |

Modern Pop Classics is a 1980 split single featuring the songs "I'm Sticking With You" by Maureen Tucker & Friends and "Of Yesterday" by Count Viglione & Lady Carolyn.

== Track listing ==
Side 1:
"I'm Sticking With You" – 2:13
Side 2:
"Of Yesterday" – 2:45

== Personnel ==
Side One

- Maureen Tucker – vocals
- Jonathan Richman – vocals
- Willie Alexander – keyboards, backing vocals
- George Nardo – guitar
- Walter Powers – bass
- Jim Wilkin – drums
