= Moe Tucker =

American musician and singer (born 1944)

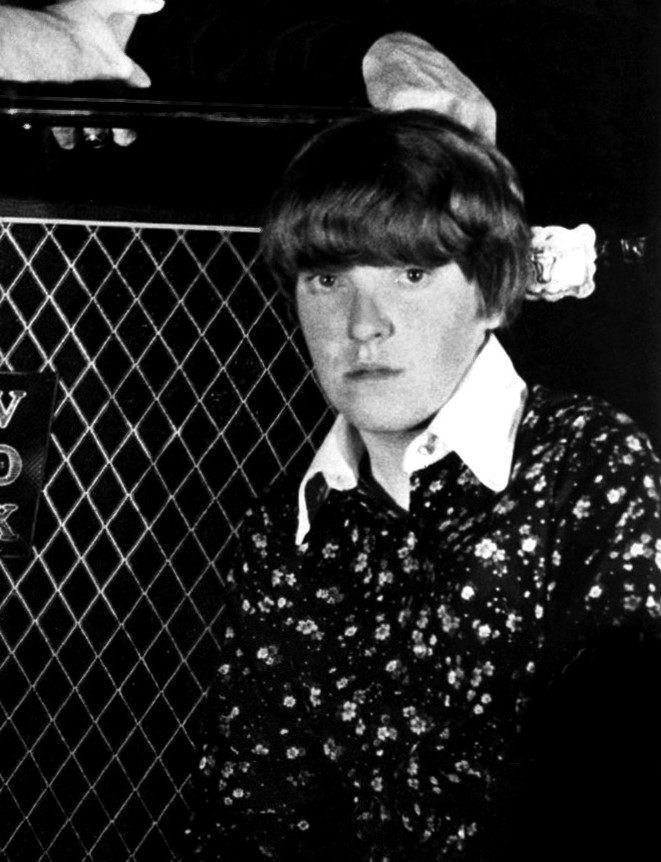
- Tucker in 1966

Background information
- Born: Maureen Ann Tucker; August 26, 1944 (age 82); New York City, U.S.
- Origin: Levittown, New York, U.S.
- Genres: Experimental rock; proto-punk; rock and roll; art rock; avant garde; folk rock
- Occupations: Musician; singer; songwriter
- Instruments: Drums; percussion; guitar; vocals; bass
- Years active: 1963–c. 2007; 2017
- Formerly of: The Velvet Underground; Half Japanese

Maureen Ann "Moe" Tucker (born August 26, 1944) is an American retired musician, singer, and songwriter who achieved international fame as the drummer of the rock band the Velvet Underground. Tucker occasionally sang lead vocals with the group, including the songs "After Hours" and "I'm Sticking With You".

After the Velvet Underground disbanded in the early 1970s, she took a hiatus to focus on her marriage and family. She returned in the 1980s, and, until the late 2000s, released four solo studio albums and performed as a session musician. In 1996, Tucker was inducted into the Rock and Roll Hall of Fame as a member of the Velvet Underground.

== Early life ==
Maureen Ann Tucker was born on August 26, 1944, in Jackson Heights, Queens, New York City, and grew up in Levittown, New York, in a middle-class Catholic family. Her father, James, was a housepainter and her mother, Margaret, was a clerical worker. She had an older brother, Jim, who was friends with Sterling Morrison, and a sister, Margo.

== Career ==
=== The Velvet Underground ===
Tucker began playing the drums in 1963, at age 19, having been infatuated with The Rolling Stones; she chose the instrument as she wanted to play along to music. When she was asked to join the Velvet Underground, she had dropped out of Ithaca College and was working for IBM as a keypunch operator. The band's original percussionist, Angus MacLise, had left in November 1965 because he felt the band sold out when it took a paying gig. Tucker was drafted because Velvets guitarist Sterling Morrison remembered her as the younger sister of his high school friend, Jim, who played the drums. Tucker was frequently noted for her androgynous appearance. In spite of this, Tucker has said that she never experienced difficulties due to sexism during this time.

Tucker's style of playing was unconventional. She played standing up rather than seated (for easier access to the bass drum), using a simplified drum kit of tom toms, a snare drum and an upturned bass drum, playing with mallets rather than drumsticks. She rarely used cymbals; she claimed that since she felt the purpose of a drummer was simply to "keep time", cymbals were unnecessary for this purpose and drowned out the other instruments. Rock critic Robert Christgau said of Tucker, "Mo was a great drummer in a minimalist, autodidactic way that I think changed musical history. She is where the punk notion of how the beat works begins."

Apart from drumming, Tucker sang co-lead vocals on three Velvet Underground songs: the acoustic guitar number "After Hours" and the experimental poetry track "The Murder Mystery", both from 1969's The Velvet Underground album, as well as "I'm Sticking with You", a song recorded in 1969 but left (officially) unreleased until it appeared on the 1985 outtakes compilation VU. Lou Reed said of "After Hours" that it was "so innocent and pure" that he could not possibly sing it himself. In the early days, Tucker also occasionally played the bass guitar during live gigs, an instrument that was usually played by the band's regular bassist John Cale. Morrison would normally play the bass if Cale was occupied with viola or keyboards, despite his lack of enthusiasm for playing the instrument. However, some songs had Reed and Morrison playing their usual guitars and Cale was occupied with viola or keyboards and as a result, nobody was on bass: two examples of this are "Heroin" and "Sister Ray".

Tucker temporarily left the group when she became pregnant with her first child, Kerry "Trucker" Tucker, in early 1970. Because of her pregnancy, Tucker was only able to play on a couple of outtakes for Loaded, which would become the band's fourth and final album with Lou Reed. Billy Yule, the younger and high-school-age brother of bassist Doug Yule, filled in the role of drummer for live performances and some of the songs on the album.

Tucker returned to the band in late 1970, by which time Reed had left the group and Doug Yule had assumed leadership. She toured North America (United States and Canada) and Europe (United Kingdom and the Netherlands) with the band during 1970 and 1971; shortly afterward, she quit the band and the music business altogether to raise a family.

Tucker participated in the 1993 Velvet Underground reunion, touring Europe and releasing the double album Live MCMXCIII.

In 2017 she played at the Grammy Salute to Music Legends awards ceremony. A band, amongst others, consisting of John Cale, played two Velvet Underground classics "Sunday Morning" and "I'm Waiting For The Man". The Velvet Underground was the recipient of the 2017 Merit Award.

In 2021, Tucker participated in Todd Haynes' documentary The Velvet Underground.

=== Other work ===
Tucker moved to Phoenix, Arizona, in 1971, where she lived with her husband and children. While living in Phoenix, she played drums in the short-lived band Paris 1942 with Alan Bishop of the Sun City Girls. In the early 1980s, she divorced and relocated to Douglas, Georgia, where she was hired at a Wal-Mart distribution center. She quit the job in 1989 when she was asked to go on tour of Europe with the band Half Japanese.

Tucker started recording and touring again, releasing a number of albums on small, independent labels that feature her singing and playing guitar, fronting her own band. This band at times included former Velvets colleague Sterling Morrison.

Apart from releasing her own records, Tucker has made guest performances on a number of others' records, including producing Fire in the Sky (1992) for Half Japanese, whose guitarist, John Sluggett, plays drums on her own recordings. In Jeff Feuerzeig's documentary about Half Japanese, The Band That Would Be King, Tucker performs and is interviewed extensively. Also, she has appeared with Magnet and former Velvet Underground band members Lou Reed (New York) and John Cale (Walking on Locusts).

Tucker also played drums on and produced the album The Lives of Charles Douglas by indie rocker and novelist Charles Douglas (also known as Alex McAulay) in 1999.

She played bass drum, wrote songs, and sang with the New York/Memphis punk rock–delta blues fusion group the Kropotkins with Lorette Velvette and Dave Soldier, whom she met in John Cale's band, in 1999–2003, recording "Five Points Crawl".

In a 2010 interview, Tucker said she had ceased making music several years prior.

== Artistry ==
As a teenager, Tucker was a fan of Nigerian drummer Babatunde Olatunji, whose music she first heard on Murray the K's radio show. Olatunji, along with Bo Diddley and the Rolling Stones, inspired her to become a musician. Without any formal instruction, she learned by playing along with popular songs on a second-hand drum kit.

== Personal life ==
Tucker was married in the early 1970s, and divorced some time in the early 1980s. She has five children: Kerry, Keith, Austen, Kate, and Richard. Tucker lives in Douglas, Georgia, where she raised her family.

During an April 2009 interview at a Tea Party rally in Tifton, Georgia, Tucker revealed to a WALB NBC news crew that she is a supporter of the Republican Party. She voiced support for the Tea Party movement and said she was "furious about the way we're being led towards socialism". On the official "Tea Party Patriots" website, Tucker stated: "I have come to believe (not just wonder) that Obama's plan is to destroy America from within."

== Backup band ==
- John Sluggett
- Sonny Vincent
- Victor DeLorenzo
- Hank Beckmeyer
- Tico Zamora
- Lance Cagle
- Daniel Hutchens
- Daniel Fullerton

== Discography ==
=== Studio albums ===
==== Solo ====
Title	Album details
Playin' Possum	Released: 1981; Label: Trash Records, Rough Trade; Format: CD, LP
Life in Exile After Abdication	Released: 1989; Label: 50 Skidillion Watts; Format: CD, LP
I Spent a Week There the Other Night	Released: 1991; Label: New Rose; Format: CD, LP
Dogs Under Stress	Released: 1994; Label: Sky; Format: CD, LP

==== With the Velvet Underground ====
- The Velvet Underground & Nico (1967)
- White Light/White Heat (1968)
- The Velvet Underground (1969)
- Loaded (1970) (Note: credited, but does not appear due to maternity leave; on the Fully Loaded edition, does appear singing on the outtake "I'm Sticking with You" and playing drums on the demo of "I Found a Reason")

==== With Half Japanese ====
- Fire in the Sky (1993)

=== Live albums ===
Title	Album details
Oh No, They're Recording This Show	Released: 1992; Format: CD, LP
Moe Rocks Terrastock	Released: 2002; Format: CD, LP

=== Compilation albums ===
Title	Album details
Waiting for My Men	Released: 1998; Format: CD, LP
I Feel So Far Away: Anthology 1974–1998	Released: 2012; Format: CD, LP

=== Extended plays ===
Title	Album details
Another View	Released: 1985; Format: CD, LP
Moejadkatebarry	Released: 1987; Label: 50 Skidillion Watts; Format: CD, LP
GRL-GRUP	Released: 1997; Format: CD, LP

=== Singles ===
As lead artist

Title	Year	Album
"Modern Pop Classics"	1980	Non-album single
"Around and Around" / "Will You Love Me Tomorrow?"	1981	Non-album single
"Hey Mersh!"	1989	Life in Exile After Abdication

=== Other appearances ===
- Charlie Pickett – Route 33 (1986)
- Lou Reed – New York (1989)
- Shotgun Rationale – Who Do They Think They Are? (1992)
- Shotgun Rationale – Roller Coaster (1993)
- John Cale – Antártida (1995)
- John Cale – Walking on Locusts (1996)
- John Cale – Eat/Kiss: Music for the Films by Andy Warhol (1997)
- Magnet – "Don't be a Penguin" (1997)
- Paris 1942 - Paris 1942 (1997)
- Charles Douglas – "The Lives of Charles Douglas" (1999)
- Bloodkin – "Out of State Plates" (1999)
- The Kropotkins – Five Points Crawl (2000)
- The Raveonettes – Pretty in Black (2005)
