= WRDO =

- Fitzgerald, Georgia; United States
- Frequency: 96.9 MHz
- Branding: Radio 96.9 WRDO

Programming
- Format: Classic hits
- Affiliations: Tom Kent Radio Network

Ownership
- Owner: Broadcast South, LLC
- Sister stations: WDMG; WDMG-FM; WHJD; WKZZ; WOKA; WPNG; WVOH-FM

History
- First air date: 1991; 35 years ago
- Call sign meaning: Radio

Technical information
- Licensing authority: FCC
- Facility ID: 24738
- Class: A
- ERP: 6,000 watts
- HAAT: 100 meters
- Transmitter coordinates: 31°44′33.00″N 83°14′39.00″W

Links
- Public license information: Public file; LMS

WRDO (96.9 FM) is a radio station broadcasting a classic hits format. It is licensed to Fitzgerald, Georgia, United States. The station is currently owned by Broadcast South, LLC and features programming from the Tom Kent Radio Network distributed through United Stations Radio Networks.

The station is managed by Micky Helms, a well-known radio personality and resident of Fitzgerald, Georgia.

Along with programming from the Tom Kent Radio Network, WRDO hosts many different shows and programs from Ben Hill County and surrounding areas including high school football, church services, and community/commerce services.
