= Coffee High School (Georgia) =

Public high school in Douglas, Georgia, United States

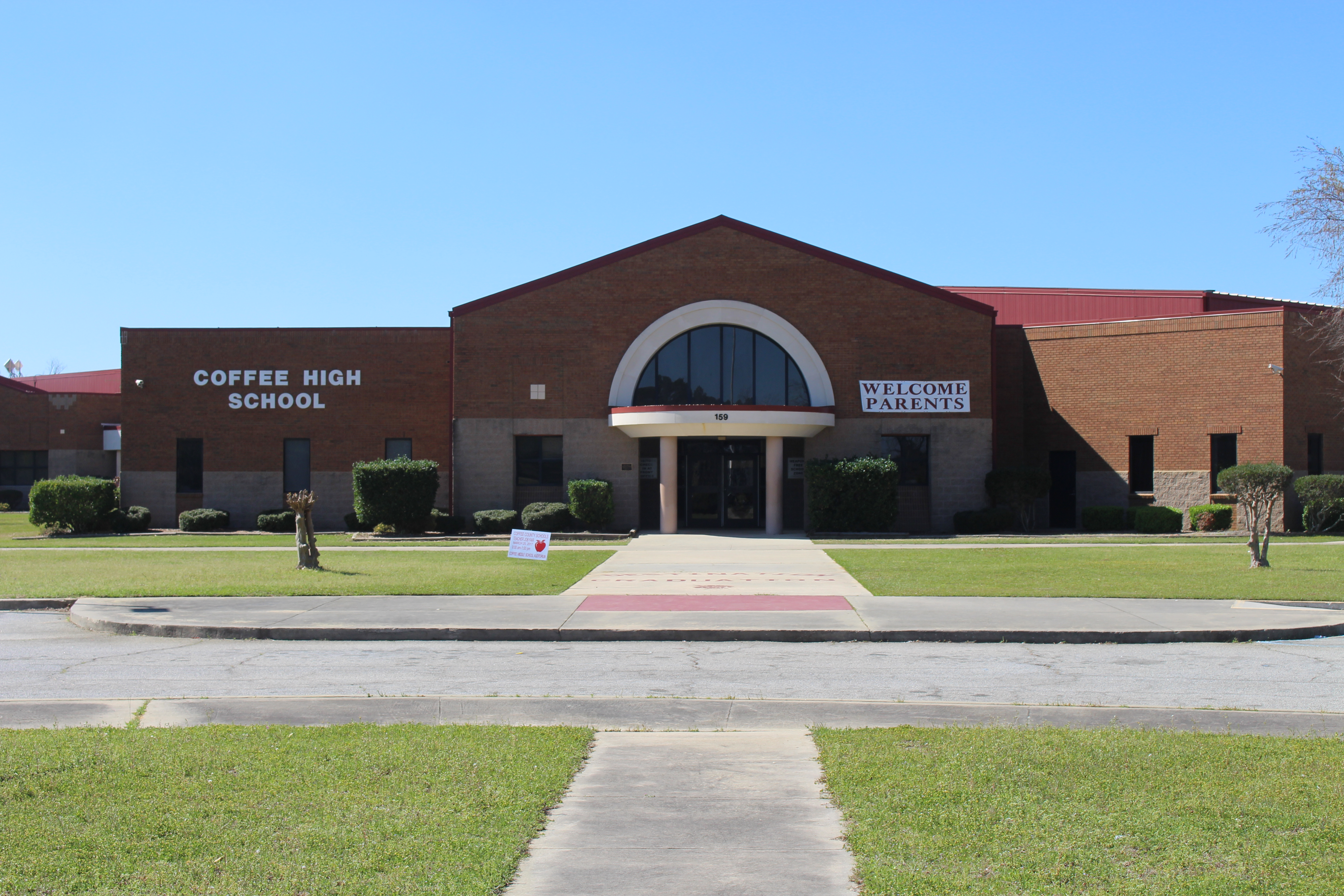
- Coffee High School in 2017

Location
- 159 Trojan Way; Douglas, Georgia 31533; United States; 31°33′10″N 82°51′41″W

Information
- Type: Public high school
- School district: Coffee County School District
- Principal: Van Allen
- Teaching staff: 92.00 (FTE)
- Grades: 9–12
- Enrollment: 1,324 (2023–2024)
- Student to teacher ratio: 14.39
- Colors: Maroon and white
- Mascot: Trojan
- Team name: Coffee High School Trojans
- Website: coffeehigh.ga.cch.schoolinsites.com

Coffee High School is a public high school in Douglas, Georgia, United States.

Coffee High School is a comprehensive high school that offers students a college preparatory program that includes both College Board Advanced Placement classes and Dual Enrollment opportunities through South Georgia State College and Wiregrass Technical College. Coffee High School offers all students Career Technical and Agriculture Education Pathways through a fully integrated CTAE Program.

Coffee High School’s Advanced Placement (AP) program has been recognized for excellence at the state and national level. In 2014, Coffee High School was placed on the 5th Annual College Board District AP Honor Roll. In 2015, Coffee High School was named an AP Stem School by the Georgia Department of Education.

== Activities and clubs ==
Extracurricular activities include 4-H, Art Club, The Chariot, Debate Team, Drama Club, FCCLA, Fellowship of Christian Athletes, FFA, Future Business Leaders of America , Health Occupation Students of America, The Lance, National Art Honor Society, National Honor Society, Navy JROTC, Science Club, Student Council, and Technology Students Association. In addition, there is an extensive music program (see section below).

== School sports ==
Coffee High's sports teams include Baseball, Basketball, Cheerleading, Cross country, Football (see sub-section below), Golf, Soccer, Softball, Swimming, Tennis, Track & field, and Wrestling.

=== Football ===
Coffee High School football took off when former Trojan player Bonwell Royal became the head coach in the 1970s. From 1972-1993 and again from 2001-2004, Coach Royal posted a 166-104-5 record at Coffee.

In 2001, the school concluded a divisive search for a new football coach which ended in the return of Royal. Royal retired in 2005, and the state legislature passed House Resolution 306 to commend him for his 34-year career, 26 of which were with Coffee High School. Specifically mentioned in the resolution was the 2002 Region 1-5A Championship.

In 2006, after an extensive playoff drought, the Trojan football team, led by second year Head Coach Jerry Odom, earned an 8-2 record, qualifying for the state playoffs. They lost in the second round to Stephenson High School.

In 2007, the Trojans returned to the playoffs with an 8-2 record. They once again lost in the second round.

In 2008, under new Head Coach Ken Eldridge, the Trojans finished with a 7-3 record, barely qualifying for the state Playoffs. In the first round of the Playoffs, they traveled to Stone Mountain to play Stephenson High School, the team responsible for knocking the Trojans out of the playoffs in 2006. This time, the Trojans were victorious, winning in overtime. They went on to lose in the third round, surpassing their achievements in the past two years.

In 2012, Coffee hired Robby Pruitt as its new head coach. Pruitt came to Coffee after coaching 11 seasons at Fitzgerald High School, leading the Purple Hurricanes to a 120-21-1 record, two GHSA state championship game appearances, four semi-final trips, and seven trips to the quarter-finals. Pruitt also coached in the state of Florida, where he won seven state championships.

In 2013, Pruitt's first season, Coffee finished with a 5-5 record, narrowly missing the playoffs. The following year, the Trojans went 10-2 but lost in the second round of the 5A state playoffs.

In 2015, the Trojans finished 10-2 again and won the 1-5A Region Championship, their first region title since 2002. Coffee again lost a heartbreaker in the second round of the playoffs against Kell High School.

2017 proved to be one of the Trojans' best seasons in program history. The Trojans went 10-4, defeated teams like Ware County, Valdosta, and Northside Warner Robins, and played in their first ever GHSA State Championship game. Their four playoff victories were played on the road. Coffee played Lee County, their Region 1-6A rival, in the State Championship game, but lost 28-21 in overtime.

In 2022, Coach Pruitt announced he would be accepting the head coaching job at Williston High School in Florida. Pruitt finished his tenure at Coffee High with an 83-38 record and eight straight playoff appearances.

On February 25, 2022, it was announced that Coffee would be hiring Madison County (FL) head coach Mike Coe as its new head football coach.

In 2023, the Trojans finished 15-0 and defeated the Creekside Seminoles 31-14 to win their first state championship in school history.

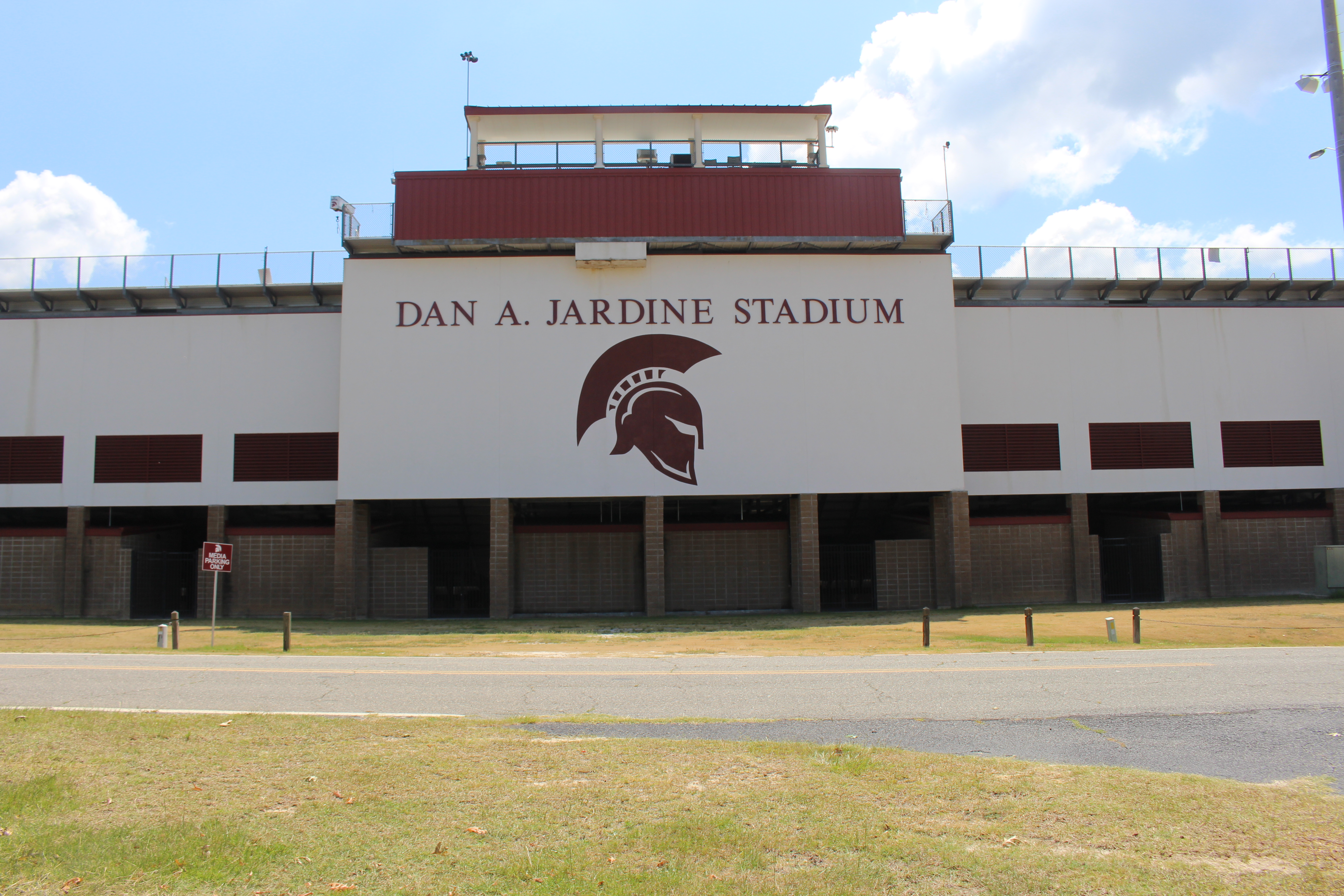
Jardine Stadium

=== Jardine Stadium ===
Named in honor of Dan A. Jardine, Jardine Stadium is the home of the Coffee High Trojans. Jardine Stadium was renovated in 2009 to include a new home seating section, ticket booths, renovated restrooms and concessions, and additional end-zone seating for the Coffee High Trojan Marching Band.

=== State Titles ===
- Football (1) - 2023 (5A)
- Baseball (3) - 1980(3A), 1982(4A), 1983(4A)
- Girls' Basketball (1) - 1980(3A)
- Boys' Golf (2) - 1963(2A), 1973(2A)
- Slow Pitch Softball (1) - 1984(3A)
- Boys' Track (1) - 1956(A)

== Music ==
The Coffee High School marching band directors are:

- Steve Myers, band director
- Tania Myers, choirs

Band accomplishments under the direction of Steve Myers include:

2004-2005: Performed at an exhibition performance at Valdosta State University and received Superior and Excellent ratings at the GMEA Concert Band Festival.

2005-2006: Superior and excellent ratings at GMEA concert band festivals.

2006-2007: Received Superior and Excellent ratings at the Chiefland Invitational Marching Band Competition, winning 2nd place in Class AA and 3rd place overall in the competition. They received Superior ratings at the GMEA Concert Band Festival. That spring they received Superior rating for Jazz Ensemble on the Music Festivals Bahamas Cruise Competition, and also received awards for outstanding saxophone and rhythm sections. Overall, the Jazz Band was named "Grand Champion" of all combined cruise competitions later on.

2007-2008: Exhibition performance at a Valdosta State University football game. Received Superior and Excellent ratings at the West Port Marching Band Competition in Florida. At the marching competition, they received best class in woodwinds, brass, auxiliary, and percussion. They received first place in Class AA, fifth place overall. They received Excellent ratings at GMEA concert band festival.

2008-2009: Superior ratings at GMEA concert band festivals.

2009-2010: Hosted a marching band festival at Dan Jardine Stadium and received an overall "superior" rating.

2010-2011: Participated in a marching band festival at Bear Stadium in Pierce County and received an "all superior" rating. Fourth Overall.

=== Jazz Band ===
The sound of the group varies from soulful jazz to contemporary standards. The Jazz Band is under the direction of Steve Myers.

Spring 2010: The Jazz Band performed in Orlando. Together the CHS Show Choir, Concert Choir, and Jazz Band all received "superior" ratings at a festival, garnering them the "Sweepstakes Trophy".

=== Chorus ===
Chorus and Show Choir are under the direction of Tania Myers. The Show Choirs perform over 40 times a year at various community, church, and school functions.

== Notable alumni ==
- Willis Crockett, former NFL player for the Dallas Cowboys
- Adrian Grady, former NFL player
- Tyreek Hill, NFL player
- Riccardo Ingram, former professional baseball player (Detroit Tigers, Minnesota Twins)
- Cathy Latham, teacher and Republican political activist
- Wyatt Miller, former NFL player
- Jennifer Nettles, musician, member of Sugarland
- Jamie Newton, Survivor: Guatemala contestant
- Garrett Scott, former NFL player for the Seattle Seahawks
- Trevis Simpson, professional basketball player
- Willie Spence, American Idol Season 19 runner-up
- Greg Walker, former professional baseball player for the Chicago White Sox and Baltimore Orioles, former hitting coach of the Atlanta Braves
