= Tyreek Hill =

American football player (born 1994)

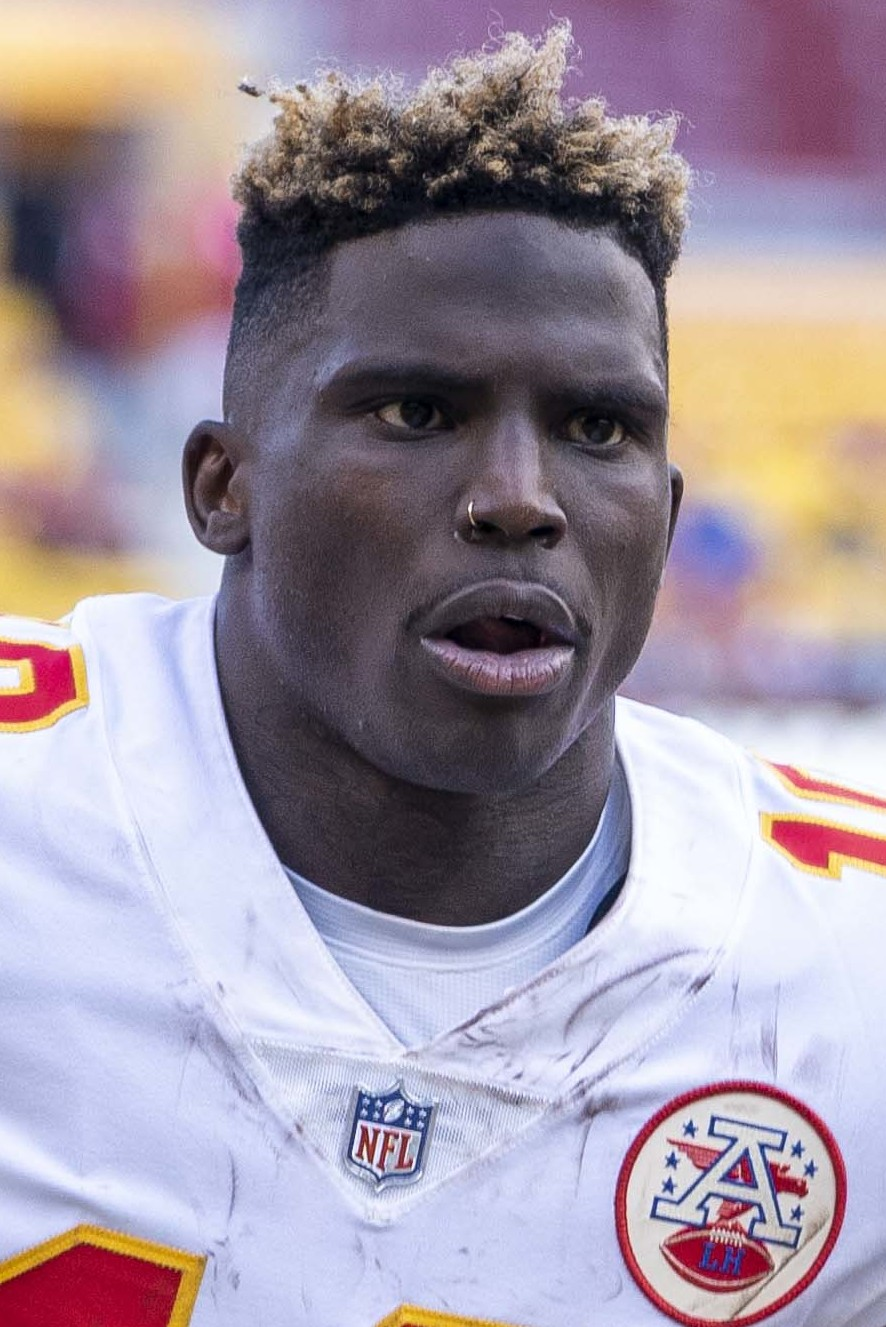
- Hill with the Kansas City Chiefs in 2021

Profile
- Position: Wide receiver

Personal information
- Born: March 1, 1994 (age 32); Douglas, Georgia, U.S.
- Listed height: 5 ft 10 in (1.78 m)
- Listed weight: 191 lb (87 kg)

Career information
- High school: Coffee (Douglas)
- College: Garden City (2012–2013); Oklahoma State (2014); West Alabama (2015)
- NFL draft: 2016: 5th round, 165th overall pick

Career history

Playing
- Kansas City Chiefs (2016–2021); Miami Dolphins (2022–2025)

Coaching
- Lee's Summit North (MO) (2020) Assistant coach

Awards and highlights
- Super Bowl champion (LIV); 5× First-team All-Pro (2016 (Note: Selected as a punt returner), 2018 (Note: Selected as the flex), 2020, 2022, 2023); Second-team All-Pro (2018 (Note: Selected as a wide receiver)); 8× Pro Bowl (2016–2023); NFL receiving yards leader (2023); NFL receiving touchdowns co-leader (2023); NFL 2010s All-Decade Team; PFWA All-Rookie Team (2016); Big 12 Offensive Newcomer of the Year (2014); First-team All-Big 12 (2014)

Career NFL statistics as of 2025
- Receptions: 819
- Receiving yards: 11,363
- Receiving touchdowns: 83
- Return yards: 1,439
- Return touchdowns: 5
- Rushing yards: 819
- Rushing touchdowns: 7
- Stats at Pro Football Reference

Medal record

Men's athletics

Representing the United States

World Junior Championships
Gold medal – first place	2012 Barcelona	4×100 m relay
Bronze medal – third place	2012 Barcelona	200 m

Tyreek Hill (born March 1, 1994) is an American professional football wide receiver. He played college football for the Garden City Broncbusters, Oklahoma State Cowboys, and West Alabama Tigers before being selected by the Kansas City Chiefs in the fifth round of the 2016 NFL draft. He most recently played for the Miami Dolphins.

A former track and field star, Hill played primarily as a return specialist as a rookie but has transitioned to strictly playing wide receiver. Following his rookie year, he received the nickname "Cheetah" in reference to his speed. He was selected to the Pro Bowl in each of his first eight seasons in the league, won Super Bowl LIV with the Chiefs, and was named to the NFL 2010s All-Decade Team as a punt returner. Hill was later traded to the Miami Dolphins, with whom he led the league in receiving yards and touchdowns in 2023, but was released after the 2025 season following a significant knee injury.

== Early life ==
Hill was born on March 1, 1994, and is the son of Anesha Sanchez and Derrick Shaw. A native of Douglas, Georgia, Hill attended Coffee High School, where he won both the 100 meters and 200 meters at the 2012 Georgia 5A state meet.

Hill was a USA Today All-American track and field selection as well as Track and Field News "High School Athlete of the Year" in 2012, after finishing the track season with personal bests in the 100-meter (10.19 s) and 200-meter sprints (20.14 s). Hill's time in the 200 m was the fastest by a junior athlete since Ramil Guliyev's 20.04 s in 2009, and missed Roy Martin's 1985 national high school record by only one hundredth of a second. His time in the 100 m tied Abraham Hall for second fastest by a junior in the 2012 season, behind only Adam Gemili.

== College career ==
=== Garden City ===
At Garden City Community College in Garden City, Kansas, Hill ran track and played football. As a sophomore in 2013, Hill ran for 659 rushing yards and five touchdowns while catching 67 passes for 532 receiving yards for the Broncbusters football team.

=== Oklahoma State ===
Coming out of Garden City Community College, Hill was a highly sought-after junior college recruit and chose to attend Oklahoma State University in Stillwater, Oklahoma.

On August 30, 2014, Hill made his debut for the Cowboys and caught a season-high six passes for 62 receiving yards in a 37–31 loss to the Florida State Seminoles. On September 25, he caught his first career touchdown against the Texas Tech Red Raiders and finished the 45–35 victory with three receptions for 50 yards, six rushing attempts for 39 yards, and three kick returns for 62 yards. In the following 37–20 win against the Iowa State Cyclones, Hill finished with a season-high 148 yards on five kick returns, one of which he returned 97 yards for his first touchdown of the season. On November 1, he gained a season-high 102 rushing yards on 18 attempts and scored his first rushing touchdown of the season in a 48–14 loss to the Kansas State Wildcats.

On December 6, he appeared in his last game with Oklahoma State and helped them win a comeback victory over their rival Oklahoma Sooners after he returned a punt for a 92-yard touchdown.

==== Dismissal ====
On December 11, 2014, Oklahoma State dismissed Hill from their football and track teams following his arrest and guilty plea for domestic violence. In his only season at Oklahoma State, Hill had a total of 102 rushes for 534 yards and a rushing touchdown, 31 receptions for 381 yards and a receiving touchdown, as well as 30 kick returns for 740 yards and two touchdowns, and 27 punt returns for 256 yards and a touchdown. As a running back, wide receiver and returner, he accounted for 1,911 all-purpose yards and five touchdowns. He was ranked 9th nationally for the amount of punt returns made.

=== West Alabama ===
On September 1, 2015, the University of West Alabama in Livingston, Alabama, announced that Hill enrolled and would play football for the Tigers. West Alabama head coach Brett Gilliland said he initially turned down Hill after he read the police report, alleging that Hill choked and hit his girlfriend. But after getting to know Hill personally, he spoke to people at Oklahoma State, Hill's former coaches at Garden City Community College, and a high school mentor, and was swayed to accept him after reading his plea agreement, which required that Hill either attend school full-time or be employed.

On the field, Hill was utilized as widely as he had the previous season, serving as a running back (25 carries for 237 yards and one touchdown), wide receiver (27 receptions for 444 yards and a touchdown), punt returner (20 returns averaging 10.7 yards with two touchdowns), and kick returner (20 returns averaging 23.0 yards with two touchdowns). In his 11 games for the team, he never exceeded 100 yards rushing or receiving, having averaged 135 all-purpose yards until a 307-all-purpose-yard game against Delta State in Game 8. After this, his production tapered off quickly to a season-ending −3 all-purpose-yards against the North Alabama Lions.

== Professional career ==
=== Pre-draft ===
Hill was projected to go undrafted during the 2016 NFL draft, predominantly due to his domestic violence arrest. He was not invited to the NFL Combine but was able to showcase his abilities at West Alabama's Pro Day. Scouts were impressed with his speed and his Pro Day workout. His head coach at West Alabama said that at least 20 NFL teams were interested in Hill.

Pre-draft measurables
Height	Weight	Arm length	Hand span	Wingspan	40-yard dash	10-yard split	20-yard split	20-yard shuttle	Three-cone drill	Vertical jump	Broad jump	Bench press
5 ft 8 1/8 in (1.73 m)	185 lb (84 kg)	30 1/2 in (0.77 m)	8 in (0.20 m)	6 ft 0 1/2 in (1.84 m)	4.29 s	1.50 s	2.51 s	4.06 s	6.53 s	40.5 in (1.03 m)	10 ft 9 in (3.28 m)	13 reps
All values from West Alabama Pro Day.

=== Kansas City Chiefs ===
==== 2016 ====
In the 2016 NFL draft, Hill was selected by the Kansas City Chiefs in the fifth round (165th overall). He was the first player from West Alabama to be drafted since 1974, when Ken Hutcherson was selected 97th overall by the Dallas Cowboys. The Chiefs were criticized by fans for the selection due to his past issues with domestic violence and the Chiefs' history with former linebacker Jovan Belcher. General manager John Dorsey had to receive consent from Chiefs' owner Clark Hunt to make the selection and says they thoroughly vetted Hill, which included speaking to the prosecutor that charged him. After drafting him, the Chiefs held a press conference and addressed the issue to the media during the first day of rookie minicamp.

On May 17, 2016, the Chiefs signed Hill to a four-year, $2.58 million contract that included $100,000 guaranteed and a signing bonus of $70,000.

Hill began the 2016 season as the Chiefs' starting punt returner, kick returner, and fourth wide receiver on the depth chart behind veterans Jeremy Maclin, Chris Conley, and Albert Wilson. In the Chiefs' season opener, he made his first NFL catch for a nine-yard touchdown pass from Alex Smith as the Chiefs came back from 21–3 to defeat the San Diego Chargers 33–27 in overtime. During Week 8, Hill caught five passes for a season-high 98 yards and a touchdown during a 30–14 road victory over the Indianapolis Colts. Two weeks later, he had a season-high ten catches for 89 yards, helping the Chiefs come back from 17–3 at halftime to defeat the Carolina Panthers 20–17. In Week 12 against the Denver Broncos, Hill returned a kickoff for an 86-yard touchdown, ran for a three-yard touchdown, and caught a three-yard touchdown pass with less than five seconds left in the fourth quarter, securing the Chiefs a 30–27 overtime road victory. He was the first player with a kick return for a touchdown, rushing touchdown, and receiving touchdown in a single game since Gale Sayers did so for the Chicago Bears in 1965. During his return, he reached a speed of 22.77 miles per hour (36.64 km/h), the fastest speed any NFL player had reached that season. His performance earned him AFC Offensive Player of the Week. In Week 14 against the Oakland Raiders on Thursday Night Football, Hill made a 78-yard punt return for a touchdown, caught six receptions for 66 yards and scored on a 36-yard receiving touchdown, helping the Chiefs win 21–13 and move to first place in the AFC West. He was named AFC Special Teams Player of the Week for his performance. Two weeks later against the Broncos, Hill had a season-high six carries for 95 rushing yards and scored a 70-yard rushing touchdown in the 33–10 victory. In the regular-season finale against the Chargers, he caught five passes for 46 yards, had three carries for 15 yards, and a 95-yard punt return for a touchdown in the 37–27 win. His performance earned him his second AFC Special Teams Player of the Week honor.

Hill finished his rookie season with 61 receptions for 593 yards and six receiving touchdowns, 24 carries for 267 yards and three rushing touchdowns, 14 kick returns for a total of 384 yards and a touchdown, and 39 punt returns for 592 yards and two touchdowns. His punt return yards and yards per punt return average (15.2) ranked first in the league, while his punt return touchdowns (2) tied for first with Andre Roberts and Marcus Sherels. He also appeared in all 16 games with one start, and made seven combined tackles. He was named to the 2017 Pro Bowl as a return specialist. On January 6, 2017, Hill was named first-team All-Pro as a punt returner. He was named to the 2016 PFWA NFL All-Rookie Team on special teams, and was ranked 36th by his fellow players on the NFL Top 100 Players of 2017.

==== 2017 ====
The 2017 season saw Hill focus less on his role as a running back. On September 7, 2017, in the season opening game against the defending Super Bowl champion, the New England Patriots, Hill finished with 133 receiving yards on seven receptions, which included a 75-yard reception for a touchdown, as the Chiefs won 42–27 on the road. In Week 5 against the Houston Texans, he recorded an 82-yard punt return touchdown in the fourth quarter of a 42–34 victory. Three weeks later against the Broncos on Monday Night Football, Hill threw the first interception of the Chiefs' season on a failed trick play in a 29–19 home win. In the subsequent Week 9 game against the Dallas Cowboys, he scored a 56-yard touchdown pass from Alex Smith on an unconventional end-of-half play. As time in the second quarter expired, the Chiefs lined up as if they were going for a Hail Mary pass. Smith threw a checkdown pass to Hill, who had a convoy of blockers clear enough space for him to maneuver to the end zone for the touchdown. However, Dallas scored an un-answered 14 points throughout the second half as Kansas City lost 28–17. During Week 13 against the New York Jets, Hill had a season-high 185 receiving yards on six receptions and two touchdowns, which included a 79-yard touchdown. However, the Chiefs lost on the road by a score of 38–31, Kansas City's last loss in four consecutive games. On December 19, Hill was named to his second consecutive Pro Bowl as a return specialist.

Hill finished his second professional season with 75 receptions for 1,183 yards and seven touchdowns in 15 games and 13 starts. In addition, he had 25 punt returns for 204 yards and a return touchdown.

The Chiefs finished the 2017 season atop the AFC West with a 10–6 record and made the playoffs. In the narrow 22–21 loss to the Tennessee Titans in the Wild Card Round, Hill finished with seven receptions for 87 yards and a single 14-yard rush. He was ranked 40th by his fellow players on the NFL Top 100 Players of 2018.

==== 2018 ====
During Week 1 of the 2018 season against the Los Angeles Chargers, Hill ran his first punt return of the season 91 yards for a touchdown. He also had 7 receptions for 169 yards and two receiving touchdowns as the Chiefs won 38–28 on the road. In the game, he hauled in a 58-yard touchdown pass, his 13th-career touchdown of over 50 yards and Patrick Mahomes' first career touchdown pass. For the second time in his career, he recorded three touchdowns in a single game. The following week against the Pittsburgh Steelers, he caught five passes for 90 yards and a receiving touchdown as the Chiefs won 42–37. In Week 6, after three games of low-performance for Hill, he recorded three receiving touchdowns on seven receptions for 142 yards against the Patriots during a 43–40 road loss. In Week 10 against the Arizona Cardinals, Hill had his third game of the season with over 100 receiving yards, catching seven receptions for 117 yards and two receiving touchdowns, along with a single 20-yard rush, in a 26–14 victory. The following week on Monday Night Football, Hill recorded 10 catches for 215 yards (the most by any NFL receiver at that point in the season) and two touchdowns through the air in a 54–51 road loss to the Los Angeles Rams.

Hill finished the season with 87 receptions for 1,479 yards and 12 receiving touchdowns in 16 games and starts. He finished second on the team in receptions behind Travis Kelce (103) and led the team in receiving yards and touchdowns. He also finished fourth in the league in receiving yards and touchdowns, and led the league in 20+ and 40+ yard receptions. He was named to his third consecutive Pro Bowl and was named first-team All-Pro in the "flex" position and second-team All-Pro as a wide receiver alongside Julio Jones.

In the Divisional Round against the Indianapolis Colts, Hill had eight receptions for 72 receiving yards to go along with a 36-yard rushing touchdown in the 31–13 victory. In the AFC Championship, he had a single reception for 42 yards in the 37–31 overtime loss to the Patriots. Hill was ranked 19th by his fellow players on the NFL Top 100 Players of 2019.

==== 2019: Super Bowl championship ====
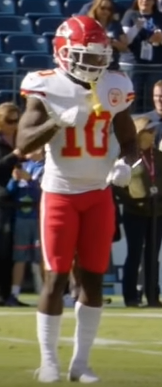
Hill in a game against the Tennessee Titans in 2019

On April 26, 2019, Chiefs general manager Brett Veach announced that Hill was suspended from team activities as a result of the ongoing child abuse investigation. The NFL announced on July 19 that he will not be disciplined for the investigation because the league felt he did not violate the personal conduct policy. On September 6, Hill signed a three-year, $54 million extension.

In the season opener against the Jacksonville Jaguars, Hill injured his shoulder and was taken to the hospital as a precaution. Later in the day, it was revealed he had a posteriorly dislocated sternoclavicular joint and would "miss some time". Hill made his return from injury during Week 6 against the Texans, where he caught five passes for 80 yards and two receiving touchdowns in the 31–24 loss. In the next game against the Broncos, Hill finished with 3 receptions for 74 yards, including a 57-yard touchdown pass, as the Chiefs won on the road by a score of 30–6. Six days later, he was fined $10,527 for flashing his signature peace sign as he jogged in for the touchdown. During Week 9 against the Minnesota Vikings, Hill caught six passes for 140 yards and a touchdown in a narrow 26–23 victory. This was Hill's first game of the season with 100+ receiving yards. In the next game against the Titans, Hill finished with 11 catches for 157 yards and a touchdown as the Chiefs lost 35–32 on the road.

Overall, Hill finished the 2019 season with 58 receptions for 860 yards and seven receiving touchdowns in 12 games and starts, earning a fourth consecutive nomination to the Pro Bowl following the season. The Chiefs finished with a 12–4 record, won the AFC West, and earned a first-round bye. In the Divisional Round against the Texans, he had three receptions for 41 yards in the 51–31 victory. In the AFC Championship against the Titans, Hill caught five passes for 67 yards and two touchdowns during the 35–24 win. In Super Bowl LIV against the San Francisco 49ers, despite not having any touchdowns, Hill caught nine passes for 105 yards, including a 44-yard catch on 3rd-down-and-15 in the fourth quarter that sparked the Chiefs' comeback from a 20–10 deficit en route to a 31–20 victory. He was ranked 22nd by his fellow players on the NFL Top 100 Players of 2020.

==== 2020: Second Super Bowl appearance ====
Hill started the 2020 season with four consecutive games recording a receiving touchdown. In Week 12 against the Tampa Bay Buccaneers, Hill finished the game with 13 catches for a career-high 269 yards and three receiving touchdowns (most of which came in the first quarter) in the 27–24 road victory. He became the first player since Lee Evans (2006) to record at least 200 receiving yards in a single quarter, and was named the AFC Offensive Player of the Week for his performance. Hill finished the 2020 season with 87 receptions for 1,276 receiving yards and 15 receiving touchdowns, to go along with two rushing touchdowns, in 15 games and starts. He earned a fifth consecutive nomination to the Pro Bowl and his third career first-team All-Pro selection (first as a first-team wide receiver). He was ranked 15th by his fellow players on the NFL Top 100 Players of 2021.

In the Divisional Round against the Cleveland Browns at home, Hill recorded eight catches for 110 yards. Despite not having any touchdowns, he hauled in a five-yard catch from veteran Chad Henne on 4th-and-1 with 1:14 left in the game to secure a 22–17 win for the Chiefs. In Kansas City's 38–24 victory in the AFC Championship over the Buffalo Bills, Hill recorded nine catches for 172 yards, including a 71-yard reception in the third quarter that set up a touchdown. In Super Bowl LV, a re-match of Week 12, he recorded seven catches for 73 yards in the Chiefs' 31–9 loss to the Buccaneers.

==== 2021 ====
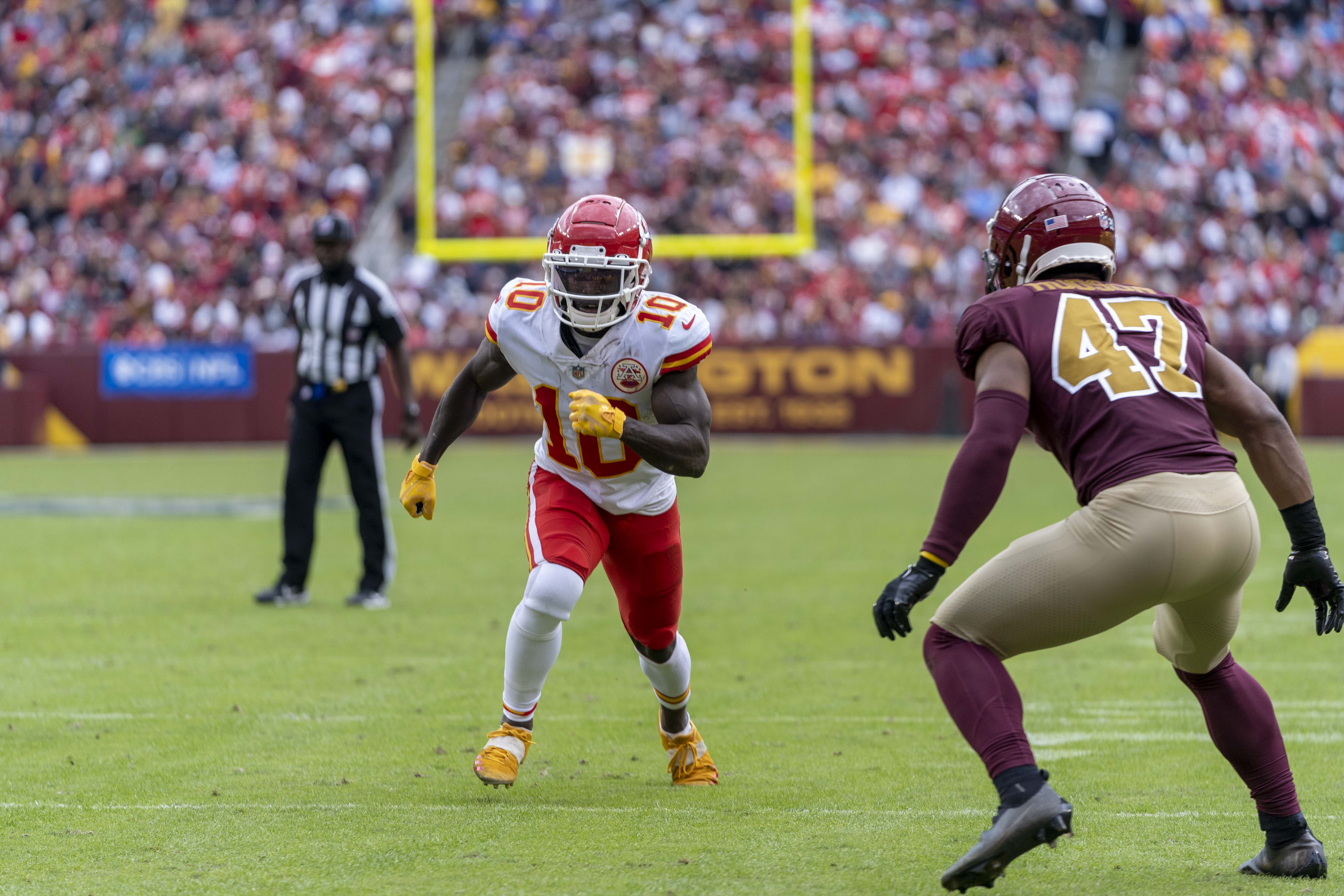
Hill playing against the Washington Football Team in 2021

Hill started the 2021 season strong with 11 receptions for 197 yards and a touchdown in the 33–29 victory over the Browns. In Week 4, a 42–30 victory over the Philadelphia Eagles, he had 11 receptions for 186 receiving yards and three touchdowns. He added a third-game with double-digit receptions with 12 for 94 yards and a touchdown against the New York Giants in Week 8. In Week 15, against the Chargers, he had 12 receptions for 148 yards and a touchdown, his fourth game in the 2021 season with at least 11 receptions. Hill was put on the Reserve/COVID-19 list on December 21, 2021. He was activated on December 25, 2021. In the Chiefs Week 17 game against the Cincinnati Bengals, he broke the Chiefs franchise record for receptions in a season, which was broken the previous year by his teammate Travis Kelce. He finished the 2021 season with 111 receptions for 1,239 receiving yards and nine receiving touchdowns. He earned a sixth consecutive nomination to the Pro Bowl.

In the Wild Card Round of the playoffs, Hill had 5 receptions for 57 yards and a touchdown in the 42–21 victory over the Steelers. In the Divisional Round against the Bills, he had 11 receptions for 150 yards and a touchdown along with a 45-yard punt return in the 42–36 overtime win. In the back-and-forth fourth quarter of the game, Hill caught a 64-yard touchdown pass from Mahomes as part of the sequence at the end of the game. In the AFC Championship against the Bengals, he had seven receptions for 78 yards and a touchdown on the Chiefs' opening drive in the Chiefs' 27–24 overtime loss. He was targeted by Mahomes on the Chiefs' last offensive play, but the ball was tipped by safety Jessie Bates into the hands of Vonn Bell. He was ranked 15th by his fellow players on the NFL Top 100 Players of 2022.

=== Miami Dolphins ===
==== 2022 ====
On March 23, 2022, the Chiefs traded Hill to the Miami Dolphins in exchange for a 2022 first-round pick (which Miami previously acquired from the San Francisco 49ers), a 2022 second-round pick, two fourth-round picks, and a 2023 sixth-round pick. After the trade was completed, Hill signed a four-year, $120 million extension. This includes $72.2 million guaranteed, making him the highest-paid wide receiver in the NFL.

Hill made his Dolphins debut against the Patriots in Week 1, catching eight passes for 94 yards in the 20–7 win. The next week against the Baltimore Ravens, Hill caught 11 passes for 190 yards and two touchdowns in the 42–38 comeback win. In Week 4, against the Bengals, he had 160 yards in the 27–15 loss. In Week 6, against the Vikings, he had 177 receiving yards in the 24–16 loss. In Week 8 against the Detroit Lions, Hill had 12 catches for 188 receiving yards in the 31–27 victory. In a Week 9 victory over the Chicago Bears, he had seven receptions for 143 yards and a touchdown. In a Week 10 loss to the 49ers, he had nine receptions for 146 yards and a touchdown. He was named to his seventh career Pro Bowl and earned first team All-Pro honors for the fourth time.

Hill finished the year with career highs in receptions and receiving yards with 119 and 1,710 respectively, and helped the Dolphins to a playoff berth before losing to the Bills in the Wild Card Round 34–31. He was ranked seventh by his fellow players on the NFL Top 100 Players of 2023.

==== 2023 ====
In Week 1 against the Chargers, Hill caught 11 passes for 215 yards and two touchdowns during a 36–34 win. In Week 3, Hill caught seven passes for 157 yards and one touchdown, during a 70–20 win against the Broncos. In Week 5, Hill caught eight passes for 181 yards and one touchdown during a win over the Giants, marking the thirteenth time in his career he had over 150 receiving yards in a single game. In Week 6, he had six receptions for 163 yards and a touchdown in a 42–21 victory over the Panthers. In Week 7 against the Eagles, Hill became the second player in franchise history, after Paul Warfield, to score a touchdown in six of the team's first seven games.

Having reached over 1,000 receiving yards after Week 8, Hill was named AFC Offensive Player of the Month for October. He became the first player in the Super Bowl era to achieve the feat of 1,000 receiving yards by the eighth game of the season. In Week 11 against the Raiders, he had ten receptions for 146 yards and a touchdown in the victory. In Week 13, against the Commanders, he had five receptions for 157 yards and two touchdowns in the victory. In week 17 against the Ravens, he reached 10,000 career receiving yards. In the 2023 season, Hill finished with 119 receptions for a franchise-record 1,799 receiving yards and 13 receiving touchdowns in 16 appearances and starts. He led the NFL in receiving yards and tied for the league lead in receiving touchdowns. He earned Pro Bowl and First Team All-Pro honors. He scored the Dolphins' lone touchdown in a Wild Card Round loss to the Chiefs. He was ranked as the best player in the NFL according to his peers on the NFL Top 100 Players of 2024.

==== 2024 ====
Before his season debut on September 8, 2024, Hill was detained by Miami police for a minor traffic violation near Hard Rock Stadium. He was taken to the ground by police and briefly handcuffed before being released. Hill still played against the Jaguars, catching seven passes for 130 yards, including an 80-yard touchdown, helping the Dolphins win 20–17. In Week 14 against the Jets, he had ten receptions for 115 yards and a touchdown.

The Dolphins finished 8–9 and missed the playoffs for the first time since the 2021 season. It marked the first time Hill had missed the playoffs in his career, and he finished with five-year lows in catches and yards. Following the team's season-ending 32–20 loss at the New York Jets, Hill expressed frustration with the team, saying "I'm out" and changing his social media profile picture to reference Antonio Brown's dramatic exit from the Tampa Bay Buccaneers a few years earlier. Dolphins general manager Chris Grier clarified that Hill never asked for a trade. He was ranked 47th by his fellow players on the NFL Top 100 Players of 2025.

==== 2025 ====
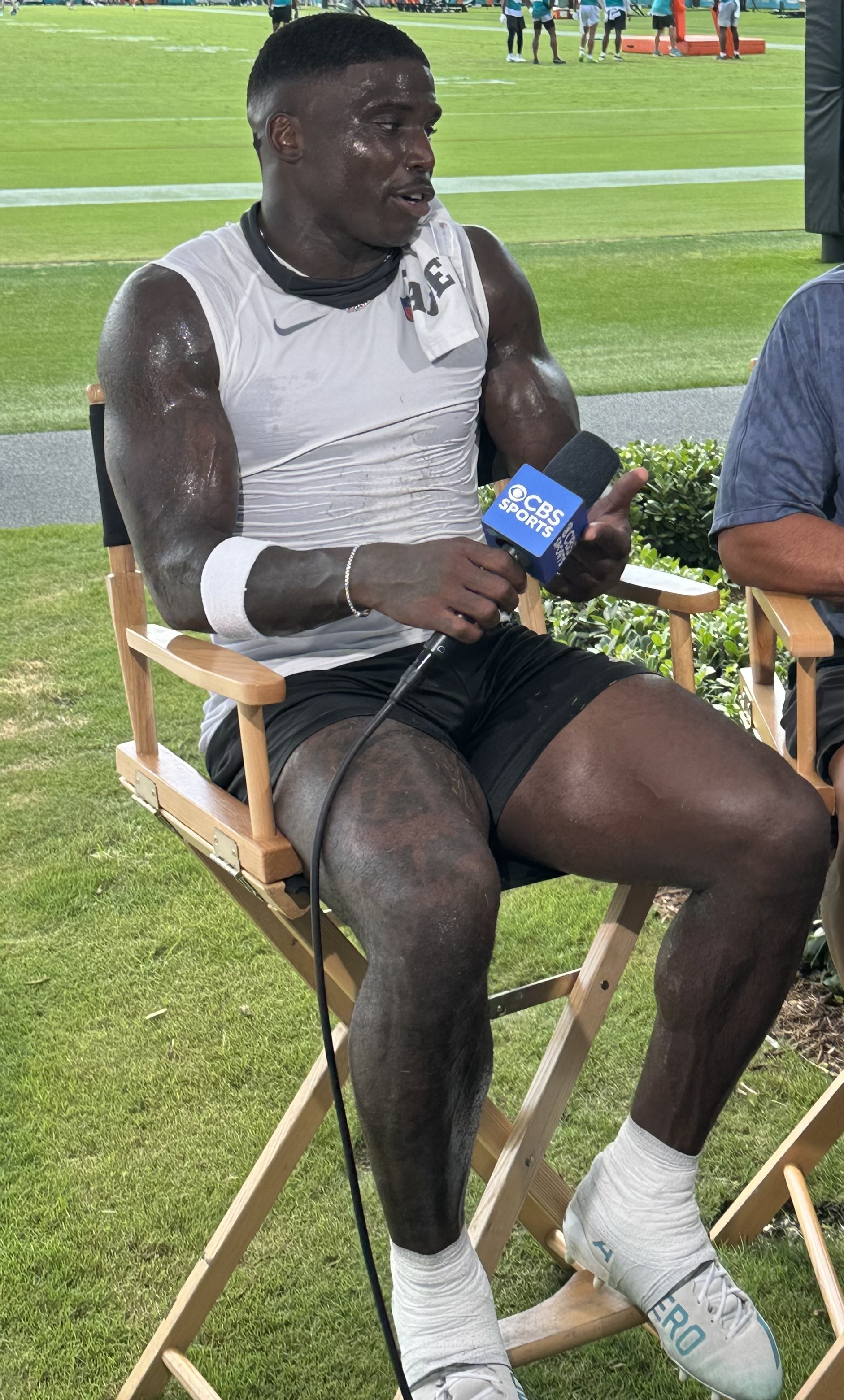
Hill being interviewed by CBS Sports at Miami Dolphins training camp in July 2025

Hill made his 2025 debut against the Indianapolis Colts. He had four receptions on six targets, for 40 yards, as the Dolphins were blown out 33–8. In week 4, on September 29, 2025, Hill suffered a gruesome season-ending injury on national television during the Dolphins 27–21 victory over the New York Jets and was taken to a local hospital. The following day he underwent major surgery to repair his dislocated left knee and multiple torn ligaments, including his anterior cruciate ligament (ACL). Initial indications were that the surgery went well and that he would be able to play in the 2026 season.

He finished his 2025 season with 21 receptions for 265 yards and a touchdown.'

On February 16, 2026, Hill was released by the Dolphins.

== Career statistics ==
Legend
	Won the Super Bowl
	Led the league
**Bold**	Career high

=== NFL ===
==== Regular season ====
Year	Team	Games		Receiving							Rushing					Returning					Fumbles	
Year	Team	GP	GS	Tgt	Rec	Yds	Avg	Lng	TD	FD	Att	Yds	Avg	Lng	TD	Ret	Yds	Avg	Lng	TD	Fum	Lost
2016	KC	16	1	83	61	593	9.7	49	6	31	**24**	**267**	**11.1**	**70T**	**3**	**53**	**976**	18.4	**95T**	**3**	**4**	**1**
2017	KC	15	13	105	75	1,183	15.8	79T	7	40	17	59	3.5	16	0	25	204	8.2	82T	1	2	0
2018	KC	16	16	137	87	1,479	**17.0**	75T	12	60	22	151	6.9	33	1	20	213	10.7	91T	1	0	0
2019	KC	12	12	89	58	860	14.8	57T	7	39	8	23	2.9	5	0	1	0	0.0	0	0	0	0
2020	KC	15	15	135	87	1,276	14.7	75T	**15**	57	13	123	9.5	32T	2	1	0	0.0	0	0	1	0
2021	KC	17	16	159	111	1,239	11.2	75T	9	75	9	96	10.7	33	0	–	–	–	–	–	2	**1**
2022	MIA	17	17	170	**119**	1,710	14.4	64	7	77	7	32	4.6	10	1	2	−4	−2.0	0	0	1	0
2023	MIA	16	16	**171**	**119**	**1,799**	15.1	78T	13	**83**	6	15	2.5	14	0	–	–	–	–	–	1	**1**
2024	MIA	17	17	123	81	959	11.8	**80T**	6	54	8	53	7.2	16	0	3	31	10.3	18	0	0	0
2025	MIA	4	4	29	21	265	12.6	47	1	17	–	–	–	–	–	1	19	**19.0**	19	0	0	0
Career		145	127	1,201	819	11,363	13.9	80T	83	533	114	819	6.6	70T	7	106	1,439	13.6	95T	5	11	3

==== Postseason ====
Year	Team	Games		Receiving							Rushing					Returning					Fumbles	
Year	Team	GP	GS	Tgt	Rec	Yds	Avg	Lng	TD	FD	Att	Yds	Avg	Lng	TD	Ret	Yds	Avg	Lng	TD	Fum	Lost
2016	KC	1	0	6	4	27	6.8	9	0	1	3	18	6.0	8	0	4	**72**	18.0	21	0	0	0
2017	KC	1	1	11	7	87	12.4	45	0	2	1	14	14.0	14	0	3	25	8.3	17	0	0	0
2018	KC	2	2	16	9	114	12.7	42	0	6	1	**36**	**36.0**	**36T**	**1**	**6**	−5	−0.8	4	0	**1**	0
2019	KC	3	3	27	17	213	12.5	44	2	9	2	11	5.5	7	0	2	19	9.5	19	0	**1**	**1**
2020	KC	3	3	**31**	**24**	**355**	**14.8**	**71**	0	**15**	**4**	14	3.5	5	0	1	0	0.0	0	0	0	0
2021	KC	3	3	28	23	285	12.4	64	**3**	12	1	−2	−2.0	0	0	2	37	**18.5**	**45**	0	0	0
2022	MIA	1	1	15	7	69	9.9	19	0	4	2	5	2.5	8	0	–	–	–	–	–	0	0
2023	MIA	1	1	8	5	62	12.4	53	1	1	–	–	–	–	–	–	–	–	–	–	0	0
Career		15	14	142	96	1,212	12.6	71	6	50	14	96	6.9	36T	1	18	148	8.2	45	0	2	1

=== College ===
Year	Team	GP	Receiving				Rushing				Kick returns				Punt returns			
Year	Team	GP	Rec	Yds	Avg	TD	Att	Yds	Avg	TD	Ret	Yds	Avg	TD	Ret	Yds	Avg	TD
2012	Garden City	11	**35**	**713**	**20.4**	5	66	389	5.9	2	21	504	24.0	1	15	138	9.2	0
2013	Garden City	10	**35**	557	15.9	**6**	**110**	**638**	5.8	**5**	7	88	12.6	0	11	62	5.6	0
2014	Oklahoma State	12	31	281	9.1	1	102	534	5.2	1	**30**	**740**	**24.7**	**2**	**27**	256	9.5	1
2015	West Alabama	11	27	444	16.4	3	25	237	**9.5**	1	20	465	23.3	**2**	20	**257**	**12.9**	**2**
Career		44	128	1,995	15.6	15	303	1,798	5.9	9	78	1,797	23.0	5	73	713	9.8	3

== Career highlights ==
=== Awards and honors ===
- Super Bowl champion (LIV)
- The Sporting News Offensive Player of the Year (2023)
- 5× First-team All-Pro (2016 (Note: Selected as a punt returner), 2018 (Note: Selected as the flex), 2020, 2022, 2023)
- Second-team All-Pro (2018 (Note: Selected as a wide receiver))
- 8× Pro Bowl (2016–2023)
- NFL receiving yards leader (2023)
- NFL receiving touchdowns co-leader (2023)
- NFL 2010s All-Decade Team
- PFWA All-Rookie Team (2016)
- 9× NFL Top 100 — 36th (2017), 40th (2018), 19th (2019), 22nd (2020), 15th (2021), 15th (2022), 7th (2023), 1st (2024), 47th (2025)
- Big 12 Offensive Newcomer of the Year (2014)
- First-team All-Big 12 (2014)

=== Records ===
NFL records

- Only player to score a receiving, rushing, kickoff return, punt return, and fumble recovery touchdown
  - Only player to score a touchdown of 50+ yards in 5 different ways

Chiefs franchise records

- Receptions in a season: 111 (2021)
- Receiving yards in a season: 1,479 (2018)
- Touchdown receptions in a season: 15 (2020, tied with Dwayne Bowe)

Dolphins franchise records

- Receptions in a season: 119 (2022 and 2023)
- Receiving yards in a season: 1,799 (2023)

== Coaching career ==
In 2020, Hill served as an assistant coach for the football program at Lee's Summit North High School in the Kansas City metropolitan area.

== Personal life ==
Hill was previously engaged to Crystal Espinal, to whom he proposed in September 2018. The two have three children together.

In March 2023, Hill's son with Camille Valmon was born.

In November 2023, Hill married Keeta Vaccaro, the sister of retired safety Kenny Vaccaro. In July 2024, Hill announced that he would have a baby girl with Vaccaro. This would be the couple's first child together. On April 7, 2025, police showed up to Hill's home as a response to a domestic dispute call made by Vaccaro's mother, but no charges were filed. The next day, Vaccaro filed for divorce from Hill.

On January 3, 2024, Hill's residence in Southwest Ranches, Florida caught fire. Firefighters took approximately 45 minutes to extinguish the blaze. An investigation revealed that a child inside the estate was playing with a cigarette lighter, which triggered the blaze.

=== Legal issues ===
==== Domestic assault conviction ====
On December 12, 2014, Hill was arrested in Stillwater, Oklahoma on complaints of assault of his 20-year-old pregnant girlfriend, Crystal Espinal. The police report stated that the two got into an argument and he threw her around "like a ragdoll", punched her in the face, sat on her and repeatedly punched her in the stomach, and choked her. Oklahoma State dismissed him from the football team after the charges.

Hill eventually pleaded guilty to domestic assault and battery by strangulation and was sentenced to three years of probation, an anger-management course, a year-long batterer's program, and was required to undergo a domestic-abuse evaluation, a sentence that Espinal was consulted about and said she was comfortable with. Espinal eventually gave birth to a boy.

==== Child abuse investigation ====
In March 2019, Hill was investigated for alleged battery after an incident in which his 3-year-old son sustained a broken arm. The following month, his son was placed into care of child services temporarily as a result of an emergency hearing conducted by the Kansas Department of Children and Families. On April 24, Johnson County District Attorney Steve Howe released a statement saying that his office believed a crime had been committed but that the evidence did not allow them to determine the perpetrator, and that the Kansas Department of Children and Families would continue to investigate. The following day, an audio recording of Hill and Espinal discussing the injury to their son, as well as the subsequent investigation, was released. In the recording that surfaced, Hill and his fiancée discuss their son's broken arm; she says that their son is scared of him, to which Hill responds, "You should be afraid of me too, bitch." As a result, the criminal investigation into Hill was re-opened. On June 7, prosecutors announced the case against Hill was inactive. On June 10, reports surfaced that medical investigations showed his son's arm had been broken by accident and in a way that indicated it had happened as he braced for a fall. On July 9, the full unedited audio recording was released where Hill accuses Espinal of lying about the domestic violence accusations in 2014 and about Hill breaking their son's arm. The NFL stated that they have always had the full audio recording. On July 19, the NFL released a statement saying that Hill would not be suspended and that they had found no evidence that Hill had violated the personal conduct policy, but that the incident would be re-examined if new evidence emerged.

==== Assault investigation ====
On June 18, 2023, the Miami-Dade Police Department announced they were investigating Hill for allegedly assaulting a male employee of the Haulover Marine Center following the two having a verbal disagreement. Later that same month, representatives for both Hill and the Haulover Marine Center employee announced a settlement had been reached. In August, the NFL announced that they would not be punishing Hill for the assault incident.

==== 2023 paternity lawsuits ====
In December 2023, it was announced that separate paternity lawsuits for child support had been filed against Hill by Brittany Lackner and by Kimberly Kaylee Baker, both of whom had given birth to Hill's children in 2023. In February 2024, Hill reached a confidential settlement with Lackner and confirmed he was the father of her son. The following July, a Broward County judge ruled that Hill was in fact the father of Baker's daughter Trae Love Hill. It was later reported that Hill could possibly be the father of at least ten children with four different women.

==== 2024 lawsuit ====
On February 23, 2024, model and influencer Sophie Hall filed a civil lawsuit against Hill, alleging that he had broken her leg during a football lesson at his house the previous June when he invited her to run offensive line drills against him. The suit said she held her own on a couple of plays, frustrating him, before one hard play caused the fracture. Hill's lawyer disputed her account and said her injury resulted from her falling over a dog that interrupted one of the plays.

==== 2024 traffic stop ====
On September 8, 2024, hours before the Miami Dolphins were set to begin their season opener against the Jacksonville Jaguars, Hill was pulled over by officers outside of Hard Rock Stadium while he was on his way to the game. Video filmed by fans was uploaded to social media and instantly made national news, showing Hill being detained in handcuffs and forced to the ground by three officers who were on top of him holding him down. Following the game, Hill said that he was accused of speeding and reckless driving and had no idea why the situation escalated like it did. "I wasn't disrespectful because my mom didn't raise me that way. Didn't cuss. Didn't do none of that. So like I said, I'm still trying to figure it out, man." Steadman Stahl, president of the South Florida Police Benevolent Association, said Hill wasn't being cooperative and that he was "redirected" to the ground after refusing to sit when he was briefly detained. Julius B. Collins, Hill's attorney, said that the traffic stop escalated when Hill gave officers his license and rolled his window back up. "One of the officers then knocked on Mr. Hill's driver side window and advised Mr. Hill to keep his window rolled down otherwise he was going to get him out of the car". Officers on the scene then placed Hill in handcuffs and forced him onto the ground.

Hill's teammate, Calais Campbell, who was also on his way to the game, stopped and got involved in an attempt to de-escalate the situation. Campbell got out of his car with his hands up above his head and approached the scene, informing officers that he was a friend of Hill's. He remained at the scene to "support" Hill after he said officers asked him to leave. Police later placed him in handcuffs for "disobeying a direct order" by being too close. "They were trying to yank him down to the ground. I saw them kick him and pull him down ... I feel like one officer was pushing on his head" Campbell said to ESPN. Florida Governor Ron DeSantis discussed the incident saying "I was pleased to see he did well in the game and it was good for the team, what happened on the field. I have confidence in agencies throughout this state that they want to uphold the highest standards of professionalism and if for some reason that wasn't followed here I know they will make that clear. But I'll let that investigation take place." One of the officers involved was placed on administrative leave following the incident, pending an internal investigation. Miami-Dade Police director Stephanie Daniels told the Miami Herald that the decision to place the officer on leave came after a review of the body camera footage from the roadside incident.

Despite the incident, Hill played in that afternoon's game against the Jacksonville Jaguars, where he finished with seven catches for 130 yards and one touchdown in a 20–17 win.

In the weeks following the incident, Hill announced an effort to combat police misconduct, hiring several attorneys, including civil rights attorney Devon M. Jacob, to bring the issue to public attention. Jacob told the media that "Tyreek intends to continue the national movement for necessary police reform that George Floyd’s death started. Tyreek is demanding that Congress finally pass the George Floyd Justice in Policing Act." On November 25, the two traffic citations issued were dismissed after all the involved officers failed to appear in the court hearing.

== Notes ==
Awards
Preceded by Ryan Crouser	Track & Field News High School Boys Athlete of the Year; 2012	Succeeded by Rudy Winkler
