= WPNG (FM) =

- Pearson, Georgia; United States
- Broadcast area: Douglas-Waycross
- Frequency: 101.9 MHz
- Branding: 101.9 The Rocket

Programming
- Format: Rock
- Affiliations: Westwood One

Ownership
- Owner: BROADCAST SOUTH DOUGLAS GA.; (BROADCAST SOUTH LLC.)
- Sister stations: WDMG; WDMG-FM; WHJD; WKZZ; WOKA; WRDO; WVOH-FM

History
- First air date: August 1999
- Call sign meaning: W PearsoN Georgia

Technical information
- Licensing authority: FCC
- Facility ID: 78442
- Class: C3
- ERP: 13,000 watts
- HAAT: 140 meters
- Transmitter coordinates: 31°19′36.00″N 82°51′54.00″W

Links
- Public license information: Public file; LMS
- Webcast: Listen Live
- Website: therocketrocks.ocm

WPNG (101.9 FM) is a radio station broadcasting a rock format. Licensed to Pearson, Georgia, United States, it serves the Douglas, Georgia and Waycross, Georgia areas. The station changed ownership when Broadcast South, LLC bought the station in 2009.

It was previously owned by KM Radio of Pearson, LLC (a subsidiary of KM Communications Inc. based in Skokie, IL), the original licensee. From November 2001 through March 6, 2009, they were known as "Freedom 101.9" and carried an Adult Contemporary format provided via satellite from ABC Radio The station was known as Classic Rock 101.9 from the date it first went on the air in 1999 until November 2001.

WPNG is under exclusive contract with the Coffee County, Georgia school system to broadcast the Coffee Trojan Football games with "Voice of the Trojans" Gene Wade and Leslie Byron Smith.

The station changed its format to Rock on January 5, 2018.
