= Life in Exile After Abdication =

Studio album by Moe Tucker
- Released: 1989
- Recorded: March 1988, June – October 1988
- Studios: Noise New York, (West 34th St, New York City); Mirror Image (Gainesville, Florida)
- Genres: Alternative pop; rock; post-punk
- Length: 48:03
- Label: 50 Skidillion Watts
- Producer: Moe Tucker

Moe Tucker chronology
Moejadkatebarry (1987)	Life in Exile After Abdication (1989)	I Spent a Week There the Other Night (1991)

Life in Exile After Abdication is the second solo studio album by American musician Moe Tucker, released in 1989 by 50 Skidillion Watts.

== Production ==
Rather than performing all of the instruments herself, as on her debut album, Tucker is accompanied by Lou Reed, Jad Fair, Daniel Johnston, and all four members of Sonic Youth.

== Critical reception ==
Professional ratings
Review scores
Source	Rating
AllMusic	4.5/5 stars
Robert Christgau	B+
The Encyclopedia of Popular Music	4/5 stars
MusicHound Rock: The Essential Album Guide	3.5/5 stars
The Rolling Stone Album Guide	3.5/5 stars
Spin Alternative Record Guide	8/10

Robert Christgau wrote that "'Work,' 'Spam Again,' and 'Hey Mersh!' are Amerindie knockouts, lived postpunk takes on the grind and release of lower-middle class adulthood, a subject rock and rollers usually leave to Nashville company men." Trouser Press wrote that "Tucker’s loose and unpredictable Life in Exile offers a little of everything, all performed and recorded with ramshackle casualness." The Chicago Reader called the album "a tour de force recording that wedded noisy indie guitar textures to songs of blue-collar rage, fueled by [Tucker's] years as a divorced mother of five trying to support her family on a Wal-Mart paycheck."

The Washington Post wrote that "anyone who ever loved Maureen Tucker—and that surely includes all true Velvet fans—will find Life in Exile, motley as it is, irresistible." The Spin Alternative Record Guide deemed the album Tucker's "finest solo outing." The New Yorker thought that the album "demonstrated an abiding love for Bo Diddley rock and girl-group pop, played as if by dinosaurs and sung as if by a choirgirl."

Reed selected the album as one of his "picks of 1989".

== Track listing ==
All tracks written by Moe Tucker except where noted.

1. "Hey Mersh!" – 3:16
  - Maureen Tucker – vocals, guitar
  - Lou Reed – lead guitar
  - Kate Messer – guitar
  - Hank Beckmeyer – guitar, bass
  - Joe Martinelli – drums
  - Scott Jarvis – drums
2. "Spam Again" – 5:25
  - Maureen Tucker – vocals, guitar, percussion
  - Jad Fair – lead guitar, percussion
  - Kate Messer – 12-string guitar, percussion
  - Hank Beckmeyer – slide guitar, percussion
  - Scott Jarvis – drums
  - Kim Gordon – percussion
  - M. C. Kostek – percussion
3. "Goodnight Irene" (Huddie Ledbetter, John A. Lomax) – 2:29
  - Maureen Tucker – lead vocals, guitar
  - Kate Messer – backing vocals
  - Hank Beckmeyer – backing vocals
  - Joe Martinelli – backing vocals
4. "Chase" – 8:07
  - Thurston Moore – guitar, arrangement
  - Lee Ranaldo – guitar, arrangement
  - Hank Beckmeyer – guitar, arrangement
  - Kim Gordon – bass, arrangement
  - Maureen Tucker – drums, arrangement
  - Jad Fair – cymbals, arrangement
  - Kate Messer – congas, arrangement
5. "Andy" – 5:08
  - Maureen Tucker – vocals, guitar, piano
  - Hank Beckmeyer – guitar
  - Jad Fair – guitar
  - Kate Messer – acoustic guitar
6. "Work" – 3:38
  - Maureen Tucker – vocals
  - Hank Beckmeyer – lead guitar, bass
  - Kate Messer – guitar
  - Barry Stock – bass
  - Scott Jarvis – drums
7. "Pale Blue Eyes" (Lou Reed) – 6:44
  - Maureen Tucker – lead and backing vocals, drums, guitar
  - Lou Reed – lead guitar, backing vocals
  - Hank Beckmeyer – guitar, backing vocals
  - Kim Gordon – bass, backing vocals
  - Jad Fair – backing vocals
  - Kate Messer – backing vocals
  - Scott Jarvis – backing vocals
  - Daniel Johnston – backing vocals
  - Rob Elk – backing vocals
  - Don Fleming – backing vocals
8. "Bo Diddley" (Ellas McDaniel) – 5:07
  - Maureen Tucker – lead and backing vocals, guitar
  - Kim Gordon – bass, backing vocals
  - Steve Shelley – drums
  - Kate Messer – backing vocals
  - Hank Beckmeyer – backing vocals
  - Scott Jarvis – backing vocals
  - Jad Fair – backing vocals
9. "Talk So Mean" – 4:59
  - Maureen Tucker – vocals, guitar
  - Kate Messer – 12-string guitar
  - Ann Marie Ear – piano
  - Kim Gordon – bass
  - Scott Jarvis – drums
10. "Do it Right" (Jad Fair, Daniel Johnston) – 3:10
  - Maureen Tucker – vocals
  - Daniel Johnston – vocals, piano

Moejadkatebarry Bonus Tacks

1. "Guess I'm Falling in Love" (Lou Reed, John Cale, Sterling Morrison, Moe Tucker)
2. "Baby What You Want Me to Do" (Jimmy Reed)
3. "Why Don't You Smile Now?" (Lou Reed, John Cale, Vance, Phillips)
4. "Hey, Mr. Rain" (Lou Reed, John Cale, Sterling Morrison, Maureen Tucker)

== Personnel ==
- Maureen Tucker: Vocals on all tracks except track 6, guitar on all tracks except 4, 6, 10, percussion on track 2, drums on track 4, 7, piano on track 5
- Kate Messer: Guitar on tracks 1, 6, 12 string guitar on tracks 2, 9 percussion on track 2, backing vocals on tracks 3, 7, 8, congas on track 4, acoustic guitar on track 5
- Hank Beckmeyer: Guitar on tracks 1, 4, 5, 7, backing vocals on tracks 3, 7, 8, Bass on tracks 1, 6, Slide Guitar & Percussion on track 2, lead guitar on 6
- Scott Jarvis: Drums on tracks 1, 2, 6, 9, backing vocals on 7, 8

Guest musicians

- Jad Fair: Lead Guitar & Percussion on track 2, cymbals on track 4, guitar on track 5, backing vocals on 7 - 8
- Kim Gordon: Percussion on track 2, Bass on track 4, 7, 8, 9, backing vocals on 7, 8
- Lou Reed: Lead Guitar on 1, 7, backing vocals on 7
- Joe Martinelli: Drums on 1, backing vocals on 3
- Daniel Johnston: Backing Vocals on 7, Vocals & Piano on 10
- M. C. Kostek: Percussion on 2
- Thurston Moore & Lee Ranaldo: Guitar on 4
- Barry Stock: Bass on 6
- Rob Elk & Don Fleming: Backing vocals on 7
- Ann Marie Ear: Piano on 9
