= Coffee County School District (Georgia) =

School district in Georgia (U.S. state)

Address
- 211 South Gaskin Avenue Douglas, Georgia, 31533; United States
- Coordinates: 31.5071897°N 82.8452875°W

District information
- Grades: Pre-kindergarten – 12
- Superintendent: Morris Leis
- Accreditations: Southern Association of Colleges and Schools; Georgia Accrediting Commission

Students and staff
- Enrollment: 7,538 (2022–23)
- Faculty: 518.90 (FTE)
- Staff: 581.40 (FTE)
- Student–teacher ratio: 14.53

Other information
- Telephone: (912) 384-2086
- Fax: (912) 383-4124
- Website: coffee.k12.ga.us

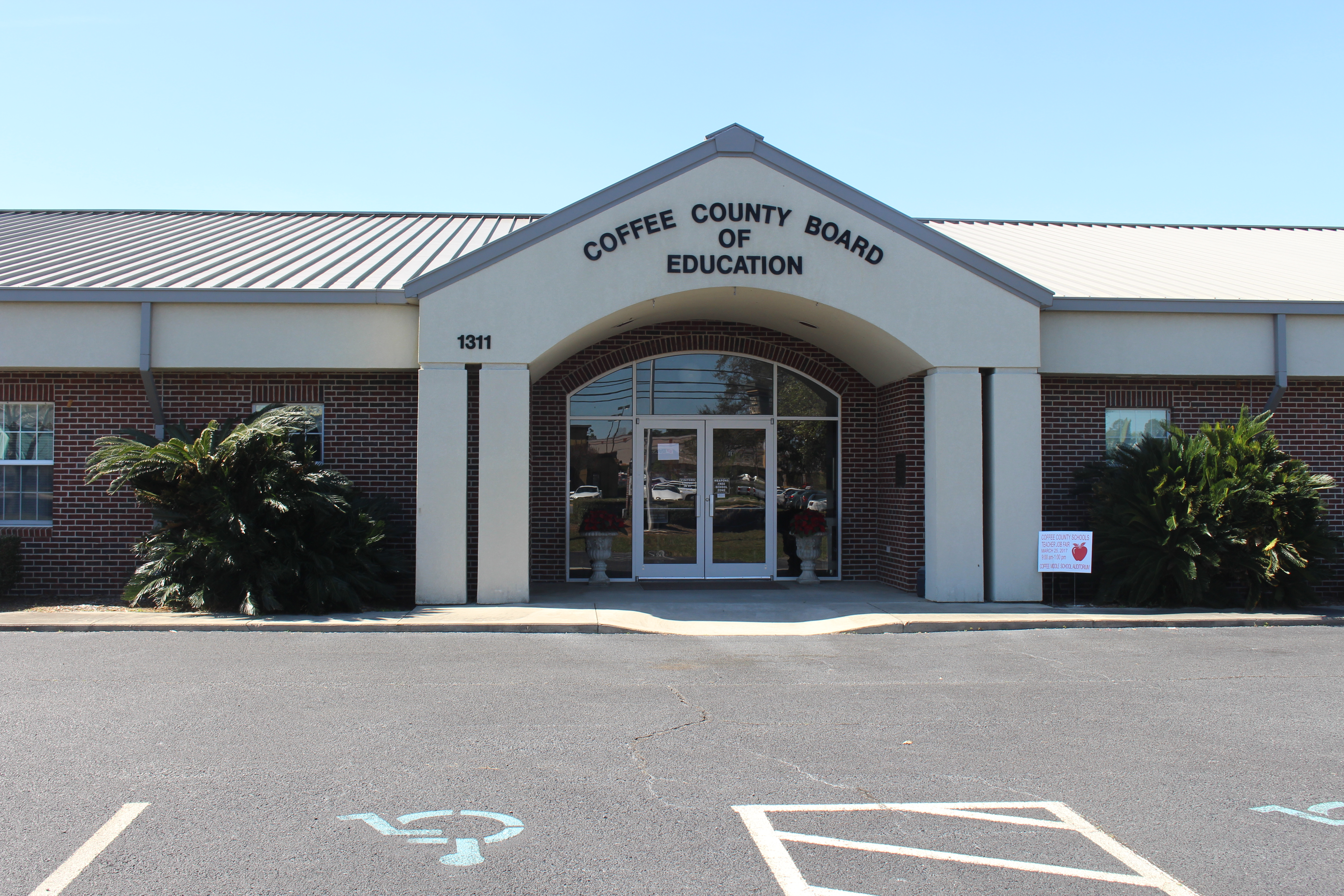
Coffee County Board of Education offices, 2017

The Coffee County School District is a public school district in Coffee County, Georgia based in Douglas. It serves the communities of Ambrose, Broxton, Douglas, Nicholls, and West Green. The district is a Charter School System and was recognized as Georgia's Charter System of the Year for 2018. It operates eight elementary schools, one middle school, George Washington Carver Freshman Campus, Coffee High School and the Wiregrass Regional College and Career Academy. The vision of the Coffee County Schools is “Creating a Stronger Community through an Equitable and Excellent Education for Every Student”.

== Schools ==
The Coffee County School District has eight elementary schools, one middle school, one ninth grade academy and two high schools.

=== Elementary schools ===
- Ambrose Elementary School
- Broxton-Mary Hayes Elementary School
- Eastside Elementary School
- Indian Creek Elementary
- Nicholls Elementary School
- Satilla Elementary School
- West Green Elementary School
- Westside Elementary School

=== Middle school ===
- Coffee Middle School

=== High school ===
- Coffee High School
- George Washington Carver Freshman Campus
- Wiregrass Regional College and Career Academy
