= Sophie Hall =

British-born American model (born 1989)

- Born: Sophie Eloise Hall; December 4, 1989 (age 36)
- Other name: Sophies Selfies
- Occupations: Model; social media influencer
- Height: 6 ft 1 in (185 cm)

Instagram information
- Page: Sophie Hall
- Years active: 2017–present
- Followers: 2.1 million

Sophie Eloise Hall (born December 4, 1989) is a British-born American plus-size model and social media influencer. She posts on social media under the username Sophies Selfies.

== Career ==
Hall began modeling at the encouragement of her younger sister, Abigail, who had modeled from the age of 17. She converted her Instagram account from "personal pictures of me and the kids to posting outfits and products". She then signed with the agency Wilhelmina Models around 2019 and was later represented by Indure, an agency based in Miami. At 6 feet 1 inch (1.85 m) and 250 pounds (110 kg), she said making a career as a plus-size model was "a huge confidence booster" and she had "become that person that I needed when I was growing up", when she struggled with her body image.

Hall's social media accounts, using the username Sophies Selfies, focus on fashion, modeling, and everyday life. She has a subscription-based OnlyFans account. Her YouTube channel has a cooking segment called "Indulge with Sophie". She had one million Instagram followers in 2019 and more than two million in 2024.

== Personal life ==
Hall lives in Pasco County, Florida.

On February 23, 2024, Hall filed a civil lawsuit in Broward County against professional football player Tyreek Hill, alleging that he had broken her leg during a football lesson at his house the previous June. The suit said he asked her over after her ten-year-old son had attended Hill's football camp and invited her to run offensive line drills against him. The suit said she held her own on a couple of plays, frustrating him, before one hard play caused the fracture. Hill's lawyer disputed her account and said her injury resulted from her falling over a dog that interrupted one of the plays.
