= Playin' Possum =

Studio album by Moe Tucker
- Released: 1981
- Studio: Trash Records aka Moe's living room (Phoenix, Arizona)
- Genres: Lo-fi; alternative pop; rock; post-punk
- Length: 39:58
- Labels: Trash; Rough Trade
- Producer: Maureen Tucker

Moe Tucker chronology
| Playin' Possum (1981) | Life in Exile After Abdication (1989) |

Professional ratings
Review scores
| Source | Rating |
|---|---|
| AllMusic | 4.5/5 stars |

Playin' Possum is the debut solo studio album by American musician Moe Tucker, who was the drummer in the Velvet Underground. Released in 1981 by Trash and Rough Trade Records, the album includes a number of renditions of classic rock and roll songs, (such as the 1955 standard "Louie Louie", Bo Diddley's title song from his 1958 self-titled album and the Little Richard hit "Slippin' and Slidin'"), as well as renditions of more modern rock songs (including Bob Dylan's "I'll Be Your Baby Tonight" and The Velvet Underground's own "Heroin"). Tucker performs every instrument on the album and recorded it in her living room, dubbed "Trash Records". "Ellas" was dedicated to Bo Diddley.

== Track listing ==
Side 1
| No. | Title | Writer(s) | Length |
|---|---|---|---|
| 1. | "Bo Diddley" | Ellas McDaniel | 3:56 |
| 2. | "Heroin" | Lou Reed | 8:49 |
| 3. | "Slippin' and Slidin'" | Richard Penniman, Edwin Bocage, Al Collins, James Smith | 3:18 |
| 4. | "I'll Be Your Baby Tonight" | Bob Dylan | 3:18 |

Side 2
| No. | Title | Writer(s) | Length |
|---|---|---|---|
| 1. | "Louie Louie" | Richard Berry | 2:42 |
| 2. | "Slippin' and Slidin'" | Penniman, Bocage, Collins, Smith | 4:30 |
| 3. | "Concerto in D Major" | Antonio Vivaldi | 3:47 |
| 4. | "Around and Around" | Chuck Berry | 3:42 |
| 5. | "Ellas" | Moe Tucker | 6:01 |

== Personnel ==
- Moe Tucker – vocals, drums, lead guitar, rhythm guitar, alto saxophone, synthesizer, tambourine, claves, harmonica, bass, gato drums, arrangements

Technical

- Stephen Mikulka – recording engineer, front cover artwork and photography

== Release history ==
- Trash TLP 1001 (Original vinyl LP release)
- M.T.-1441 (white jacket German reissue)
