= WGTM (Spindale, North Carolina) =

Radio station in Spindale, North Carolina (1982–2015)

- Spindale, North Carolina; United States
- Frequency: 1520 kHz

Programming
- Format: Defunct, was oldies and adult standards

Ownership
- Owner: Jesse A. Cowan

History
- First air date: October 1982
- Last air date: November 20, 2015
- Former call signs: WGMA (1982–2012); WVOH (2012–2014)

Technical information
- Class: D
- Power: 500 watts daytime
- Transmitter coordinates: 35°21′00″N 81°56′18″W

WGTM (1520 AM) was a radio station broadcasting an oldies and adult standards format. It was licensed to Spindale, North Carolina, United States, and is owned by Jesse A. Cowan.

WGTM went silent on November 20, 2015, after losing its transmitter site; on May 3, 2017, it notified the Federal Communications Commission (FCC) that it was unable to find a new site and requested the deletion of its license. The license was canceled on June 29, 2017.

== History of call letters ==
The call letters WGTM used to be assigned to an unrelated station in Wilson, North Carolina.
