= WVOH-FM =

Radio station in Nicholls, Georgia

- Nicholls, Georgia; United States
- Broadcast area: Douglas, Georgia
- Frequency: 93.5 MHz
- Branding: 93.5 VIBE FM

Programming
- Format: Contemporary hit radio

Ownership
- Owner: Broadcast South, LLC
- Sister stations: WDMG; WDMG-FM; WHJD; WKZZ; WPNG; WRDO

History
- First air date: 1975

Technical information
- Licensing authority: FCC
- Facility ID: 30658
- Class: C2
- ERP: 50,000 watts
- HAAT: 136.3 meters
- Transmitter coordinates: 31°29′8.60″N 82°41′28.10″W

Links
- Public license information: Public file; LMS
- Webcast: Listen Live
- Website: 935vibefm.com

WVOH-FM (93.5 FM) is a radio station licensed in Nicholls, Georgia, United States. The station was owned by John Hulett until the summer of 2008 when it was purchased by Broadcast South, LLC. The station changed its format to classic hits on September 29, 2008, became 93.5 "The Eagle" in 2011, then jumped to contemporary hit radio with "VibeFM" on January 5, 2018.
