= WDMG-FM =

- Ambrose, Georgia; United States
- Broadcast area: Douglas, Georgia
- Frequency: 97.9 MHz
- Branding: 97.9 WDMG

Programming
- Format: Hot adult contemporary
- Affiliations: Georgia News Network, UGA Athletics, Atlanta Falcons, DouglasNOW.com

Ownership
- Owner: Broadcast South, LLC
- Sister stations: WDMG; WHJD; WKZZ; WPNG; WRDO; WVOH-FM

History
- First air date: December 1983 (as WKAA)
- Former call signs: WKAA (1983–1989); WSPX (5/1989-12/1989); WKAA (1989–2004)

Technical information
- Licensing authority: FCC
- Facility ID: 39473
- Class: A
- ERP: 3,500 watts
- HAAT: 96.4 meters
- Transmitter coordinates: 31°31′51.00″N 82°54′34.00″W

Links
- Public license information: Public file; LMS
- Website: 979wdmg.com

WDMG-FM (97.9 FM, "97.9 WDMG") is a radio station broadcasting a hot adult contemporary format. Licensed to Ambrose, Georgia, United States, the station serves the Douglas, Georgia, area. The station is currently owned by Broadcast South, LLC.

== History ==
The station was assigned the call letters WKAA on June 27, 1983. On May 9, 1989, the station changed its call sign to WSPX, on December 5, 1989, to WKAA, and on September 10, 2004, to the current WDMG. It served the South Georgia area as "97.9 The Big Dog" from 2004 to 2016, before dropping "The Big Dog" image.
