= WOKA-FM =

- Douglas, Georgia; United States
- Frequency: 106.7 MHz
- Branding: 106.7 The Buck

Programming
- Format: Country music
- Affiliations: Fox News Radio

Ownership
- Owner: Coffee County Broadcasters, Inc.

History
- First air date: 1971

Technical information
- Licensing authority: FCC
- Facility ID: 12203
- Class: C1
- ERP: 100,000 watts
- HAAT: 299 meters
- Transmitter coordinates: 31°40′21.00″N 82°51′28.00″W

Links
- Public license information: Public file; LMS
- Webcast: Listen Live
- Website: 1067thebuck.com

WOKA-FM (106.7 FM) is a country music radio station licensed to Douglas, Georgia, United States. The station is currently owned by Coffee County Broadcasters, Inc. and features programming from Fox News Radio.
