= Dogs Under Stress =

Studio album by Moe Tucker
- Released: July 19, 1994
- Studio: Reeltime Studio (Savannah, Georgia)
- Genres: Alternative pop; rock; post-punk
- Length: 45:23
- Label: Sky
- Producer: Moe Tucker

Moe Tucker chronology
Oh No, They're Recording This Show (1992)	Dogs Under Stress (1994)	GRL-GRUP (1997)

Professional ratings
Review scores
Source	Rating
AllMusic	2.5/5 stars

Dogs Under Stress is the fourth solo studio album by American musician Moe Tucker, released on July 19, 1994, by Sky.

== Track listing ==
All tracks written and arranged by Moe Tucker, except where noted.

No.	Title	Writer(s)	Length
1.	"Crackin' Up"	Ellas McDaniel	4:52
2.	"Me, Myself and I"		2:37
3.	"I've Seen into Your Soul"		5:40
4.	"I Don't Understand"		2:39
5.	"Crazy Hannah's Ridin' the Train"		3:45
6.	"Danny Boy"	Frederick Weatherly	5:28
7.	"Little Girl"		2:54
8.	"Saturday Night"		3:27
9.	"Train"		6:15
10.	"Poor Little Fool"		4:51
11.	"I Wanna"		2:55
Total length:			45:23

== Personnel ==
- Moe Tucker – bass, percussion, rhythm guitar, alto saxophone, vocals
- Sterling Morrison – guitar, background vocals, electric sitar
- John Sluggett – bass, guitar, percussion, piano, violin, drums, maracas, background vocals
- Sonny Vincent – acoustic guitar, rhythm guitar, background vocals, noise
- Victor DeLorenzo – percussion, background vocals
- Daniel Hutchens – acoustic guitar, bass, rhythm guitar, background vocals
- Miriam Linna – drums, background vocals
- David Doris – alto saxophone, tenor saxophone
- Kate Mikulka – alto saxophone, tenor saxophone, shaker
- Don Fleming – guitar
- Phil Hadaway – bass, guitar, accordion, horn, keyboards, engineering, mixing
