= WKZZ =

- Tifton, Georgia; United States
- Broadcast area: Tifton-Albany-Fitzgerald, Georgia
- Frequency: 92.5 MHz
- Branding: Hank FM

Programming
- Format: Country

Ownership
- Owner: Broadcast South, LLC
- Sister stations: WDMG; WDMG-FM; WHJD; WPNG; WRDO; WVOH-FM

Technical information
- Licensing authority: FCC
- Facility ID: 50535
- Class: C3
- ERP: 20,500 watts
- HAAT: 110.0 meters
- Transmitter coordinates: 31°31′40.00″N 83°20′1.00″W

Links
- Public license information: Public file; LMS
- Webcast: streamdb6web.securenetsystems.net/cirrusencore/WKZZ
- Website: broadcastsouth.com

WKZZ (92.5 FM) is a country radio station licensed to Tifton, Georgia, United States, broadcasting as 92-5 Hank FM. The station is currently owned by Broadcast South, LLC.

Recently, the station began running recorded messages stating that "Z92.5 is Dead...Listen Friday at 5pm." As of Thursday March 4, 2010, there was a constant loop of construction sounds pointing listeners to "Tomorrow at 5 o'clock" in reference to March 5, 2010. The following day WKZZ began a stunt where every hour there was a different musical format pointing listeners to "Monday at 5P.M. to find out where the wheel will stop for the final time."

On Monday, March 8, 2010, at 5 P.M. EST, WKZZ re-launched as a CHR, transitioning from the previous Hot AC format, as 92-5 KZZ.

In February 2013, WKZZ changed their format to country as 92.5 The Farm. In July 2018, WKZZ changed its branding to "Hank FM".
