= WGTM (Wilson, North Carolina) =

Radio station in Wilson, North Carolina

Wilson, North Carolina; United States
- Broadcast area: Raleigh
- Frequency: 590 kHz

Programming
- Format: Defunct

History
- Call sign meaning: "World's Greatest Tobacco Market"

Technical information
- Facility ID: 61929
- Class: B
- Power: 5,000 watts
- Transmitter coordinates: 35°43′4″N 78°03′33″W

WGTM was an AM radio station licensed to and located in Wilson, North Carolina. Named for the World's Greatest Tobacco Market, WGTM was founded in the 1930s by the Wilson Tobacco Board of Trade. The station originally transmitted at 1310 kHz, and last operated on 590 kHz with 5000 watts full-time. 106.7 WGTM-FM was silenced by Hurricane Hazel which destroyed the tower in October 1954.

Owned by Campbell Broadcasting in the 1960s until 1985, WGTM had a block-type format, featuring local news, country, AC, gospel, and rock. It was then sold to Willis Broadcasting and the format changed to urban contemporary gospel.

The studios were located in the back of a church supply store on Highway 42 west of Wilson. The transmitter site was near Rock Ridge and featured a four-tower array that covered a large part of eastern North Carolina.

In the 1950s and 1960s the studios were located on US Highway 301 and later just off of I-95. WGTM fell silent on March 13, 2010.

WGTM was deleted by the Federal Communications Commission (FCC) on December 2, 2011, for failure to file for the renewal of its license (which expired a day earlier).
