= WDMG (AM) =

- Douglas, Georgia; United States
- Frequency: 860 kHz
- Branding: La Que Buena 860

Programming
- Format: Mexican music

Ownership
- Owner: Broadcast South, LLC
- Sister stations: WDMG-FM; WHJD; WKZZ; WRDO; WVOH-FM

Technical information
- Licensing authority: FCC
- Facility ID: 71342
- Class: B
- Power: 5,000 watts day 00028 watts night
- Transmitter coordinates: 31°30′23.00″N 82°49′10.00″W

Links
- Public license information: Public file; LMS
- Website: La Que Buena 860 Website

WDMG (860 AM) is a radio station broadcasting a Mexican music format. Licensed to Douglas, Georgia, United States. The station is currently owned by Broadcast South, LLC. Over the past 8 years the station scrapped 3 more antennas which used to form an array aimed at 268 degrees. Now one solitary mast remains in use. This is in line with the Construction Permit - which presumably has been registered with FCC for a number of years..
