= WHJD =

- Hazlehurst, Georgia; United States
- Frequency: 920 kHz
- Branding: Bright 105.9

Programming
- Format: Classic hits

Ownership
- Owner: Broadcast South, LLC
- Sister stations: WDMG; WDMG-FM; WKZZ; WPNG; WRDO; WVOH

History
- First air date: 1962 (as WVOH)
- Former call signs: WVOH (1962-2011)

Technical information
- Licensing authority: FCC
- Facility ID: 30660
- Class: D
- Power: 500 watts day 35 watts night
- Transmitter coordinates: 31°51′15.00″N 82°34′0.00″W
- Translator: 105.9 W290BR (Hazlehurst)

Links
- Public license information: Public file; LMS
- Webcast: Listen live
- Website: bright1059.com

WHJD (920 AM) is a radio station licensed to Hazlehurst, Georgia, United States. The station is owned by Broadcast South, LLC.
