= Douglas, Georgia =

City in Georgia, United States

- City
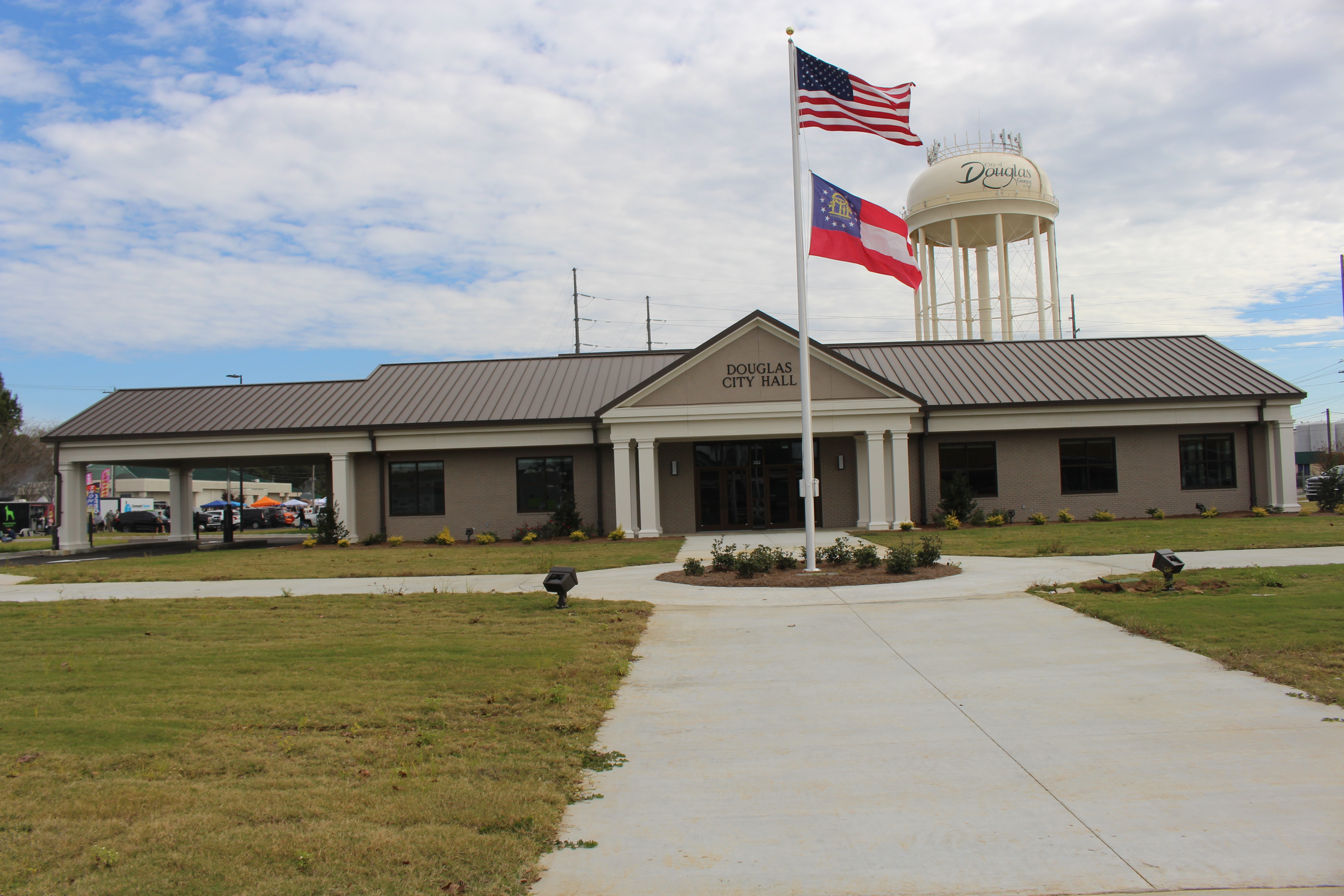
- Douglas City Hall in 2022

- Flag Logo
- Motto: Working Together to Serve You Better
- Location of Douglas in Coffee County, Georgia (left) and of Coffee County in Georgia (right)
- Coordinates: 31°30′27″N 82°51′3″W
- Country: United States
- State: Georgia
- County: Coffee

Government
  - Mayor: Tony Paulk
  - City Manager: Charles Davis

Area
  - Total: 14.68 sq mi (38.01 km^{2})
  - Land: 14.44 sq mi (37.39 km^{2})
  - Water: 0.24 sq mi (0.61 km^{2})
- Elevation: 253 ft (77 m)

Population (2020)
  - Total: 11,722
  - Density: 812/sq mi (313.5/km^{2})
- Time zone: UTC-5 (EST)
  - Summer (DST): UTC-4 (EDT)
- ZIP Codes: 31533-31535
- Area code: 912
- FIPS code: 13-23872
- GNIS feature ID: 0313591
- Website: cityofdouglasga.gov

Douglas is a city in and the county seat of Coffee County, Georgia, United States. As of the 2020 census, the city had a population of 11,722. Douglas is the core city of the Douglas micropolitan statistical area, which had a population of 50,731 as of the 2010 census.

== History ==
Douglas was founded in 1855 as the seat of the newly formed Coffee County. It was named for Senator Stephen A. Douglas from Illinois, a renowned stump speaker who was the challenger to Abraham Lincoln in the presidential election of 1860.

Douglas was chartered as a town in 1895 and as a city in 1897. In 1895, the railroad came to Douglas and the community began to boom. In 1909, the Georgia and Florida Railway located its offices in Douglas.

The Eleventh District Agricultural & Mechanical School was established in Douglas in 1906. In 1927, South Georgia College was founded as Georgia's first state-supported junior college.

During the 1920s and 1930s, Douglas was one of the major tobacco markets in the state. Much of this history is depicted in the Heritage Station Museum, located in the former Georgia and Florida Railway train station on Ward Street in downtown Douglas.

Douglas has two areas listed on the National Register of Historic Places: the downtown and Gaskin Avenue historic districts. They were added to the list in 1989.

In the aftermath of the 2020 United States presidential election, Douglas gained national attention when the elections office for Coffee County was visited by lawyers for President Trump on the day after the January 6 incident at the US Capitol, after Coffee County elections officials were unable to certify results in a mandatory recount following a close win in the state by Joe Biden over President Trump.

In late September 2024, Douglas was in the direct path of Hurricane Helene, which resulted in widespread damage and power outages. A wind gust of 80 kn (92 mph) was recorded in Douglas during the storm, with 80-85% of homes in Coffee County suffering damage.

== Geography ==
Douglas is located near the center of Coffee County at 31°30′27″N 82°51′3″W (31.507413, −82.850799). It is 59 miles (95 km) driving distance northeast of Valdosta, Georgia, 115 miles (185 km) driving distance northwest of Jacksonville, Florida, and 201 miles (323 km) driving distance southeast of Atlanta.

According to the United States Census Bureau, Douglas has a total area of 14.0 square miles (36.2 km^{2}), of which 13.4 square miles (34.7 km^{2}) is land and 0.58 square miles (1.5 km^{2}), or 4.08%, is water. Major water bodies include Twenty Mile Creek, the Seventeen Mile River (a tributary of the Satilla River), and Hilliard's Pond, which was once the ski show park "Holiday Beach".

=== Climate ===
Climate data for Douglas, Georgia, 1991–2020 normals, extremes 1902–2015
Month	Jan	Feb	Mar	Apr	May	Jun	Jul	Aug	Sep	Oct	Nov	Dec	Year
Record high °F (°C)	84 (29)	86 (30)	90 (32)	97 (36)	103 (39)	111 (44)	108 (42)	105 (41)	103 (39)	97 (36)	90 (32)	83 (28)	111 (44)
Mean maximum °F (°C)	76.9 (24.9)	80.2 (26.8)	84.9 (29.4)	90.3 (32.4)	94.8 (34.9)	98.3 (36.8)	99.4 (37.4)	98.3 (36.8)	95.1 (35.1)	90.1 (32.3)	83.9 (28.8)	79.2 (26.2)	100.6 (38.1)
Mean daily maximum °F (°C)	60.4 (15.8)	64.3 (17.9)	71.5 (21.9)	78.5 (25.8)	85.9 (29.9)	90.4 (32.4)	92.1 (33.4)	91.1 (32.8)	86.9 (30.5)	79.0 (26.1)	69.6 (20.9)	63.1 (17.3)	77.7 (25.4)
Daily mean °F (°C)	49.3 (9.6)	52.8 (11.6)	59.1 (15.1)	65.8 (18.8)	73.8 (23.2)	79.7 (26.5)	81.8 (27.7)	81.2 (27.3)	76.7 (24.8)	67.5 (19.7)	57.5 (14.2)	51.8 (11.0)	66.4 (19.1)
Mean daily minimum °F (°C)	38.3 (3.5)	41.2 (5.1)	46.7 (8.2)	53.1 (11.7)	61.8 (16.6)	69.0 (20.6)	71.6 (22.0)	71.3 (21.8)	66.4 (19.1)	56.0 (13.3)	45.5 (7.5)	40.6 (4.8)	55.1 (12.9)
Mean minimum °F (°C)	20.5 (−6.4)	24.8 (−4.0)	30.3 (−0.9)	38.0 (3.3)	48.7 (9.3)	60.0 (15.6)	65.4 (18.6)	63.9 (17.7)	52.9 (11.6)	38.6 (3.7)	31.1 (−0.5)	23.5 (−4.7)	17.4 (−8.1)
Record low °F (°C)	1 (−17)	6 (−14)	18 (−8)	29 (−2)	40 (4)	51 (11)	57 (14)	56 (13)	37 (3)	29 (−2)	16 (−9)	8 (−13)	1 (−17)
Average precipitation inches (mm)	4.38 (111)	3.99 (101)	5.14 (131)	3.34 (85)	2.64 (67)	5.21 (132)	5.42 (138)	5.68 (144)	4.17 (106)	3.35 (85)	2.79 (71)	3.80 (97)	49.91 (1,268)
Average snowfall inches (cm)	trace	0.1 (0.25)	0.0 (0.0)	0.0 (0.0)	0.0 (0.0)	0.0 (0.0)	0.0 (0.0)	0.0 (0.0)	0.0 (0.0)	0.0 (0.0)	0.0 (0.0)	0.1 (0.25)	0.2 (0.5)
Average precipitation days (≥ 0.01 in)	6.9	6.3	6.7	5.2	5.4	9.4	9.9	9.9	6.3	4.8	4.6	6.0	81.4
Average snowy days (≥ 0.1 in)	0.0	0.0	0.0	0.0	0.0	0.0	0.0	0.0	0.0	0.0	0.0	0.1	0.1
Source 1: NOAA
Source 2: National Weather Service (mean maxima/minima, precip/precip days, snow/snow days 1981–2010)

== Demographics ==
Historical population
Census	Pop.	Note	%±
1900	617		—
1910	3,550		475.4%
1920	3,401		−4.2%
1930	4,206		23.7%
1940	5,175		23.0%
1950	7,428		43.5%
1960	8,736		17.6%
1970	10,195		16.7%
1980	10,980		7.7%
1990	10,464		−4.7%
2000	10,639		1.7%
2010	11,589		8.9%
2020	11,722		1.1%
U.S. Decennial Census

=== Racial and ethnic composition ===
Douglas city, Georgia – Racial and ethnic composition Note: the US Census treats Hispanic/Latino as an ethnic category. This table excludes Latinos from the racial categories and assigns them to a separate category. Hispanics/Latinos may be of any race.
Race / Ethnicity (NH = Non-Hispanic)	Pop 2000	Pop 2010	Pop 2020	% 2000	% 2010	% 2020
White alone (NH)	4,868	4,587	3,939	45.76%	39.58%	33.60%
Black or African American alone (NH)	4,809	6,001	6,113	45.20%	51.78%	52.15%
Native American or Alaska Native alone (NH)	24	13	22	0.23%	0.11%	0.19%
Asian alone (NH)	115	105	110	1.08%	0.91%	0.94%
Native Hawaiian or Pacific Islander alone (NH)	3	9	7	0.03%	0.08%	0.06%
Other race alone (NH)	5	16	31	0.05%	0.14%	0.26%
Mixed race or Multiracial (NH)	79	130	326	0.74%	1.12%	2.78%
Hispanic or Latino (any race)	736	728	1,174	6.92%	6.28%	10.02%
Total	10,639	11,589	11,722	100.00%	100.00%	100.00%

=== 2020 census ===
As of the 2020 census, Douglas had a population of 11,722. The median age was 35.4 years. 26.0% of residents were under the age of 18 and 15.8% of residents were 65 years of age or older. For every 100 females there were 86.3 males, and for every 100 females age 18 and over there were 80.1 males age 18 and over.

98.7% of residents lived in urban areas, while 1.3% lived in rural areas.

There were 4,404 households in Douglas, and 2,610 families resided in the city. Of all households, 34.8% had children under the age of 18 living in them, 31.2% were married-couple households, 19.4% were households with a male householder and no spouse or partner present, and 42.7% were households with a female householder and no spouse or partner present. About 31.3% of all households were made up of individuals and 12.7% had someone living alone who was 65 years of age or older.

There were 5,041 housing units, of which 12.6% were vacant. The homeowner vacancy rate was 2.5% and the rental vacancy rate was 9.3%.

Racial composition as of the 2020 census
Race	Number	Percent
White	4,203	35.9%
Black or African American	6,143	52.4%
American Indian and Alaska Native	43	0.4%
Asian	112	1.0%
Native Hawaiian and Other Pacific Islander	8	0.1%
Some other race	634	5.4%
Two or more races	579	4.9%

=== Douglas micropolitan statistical area ===
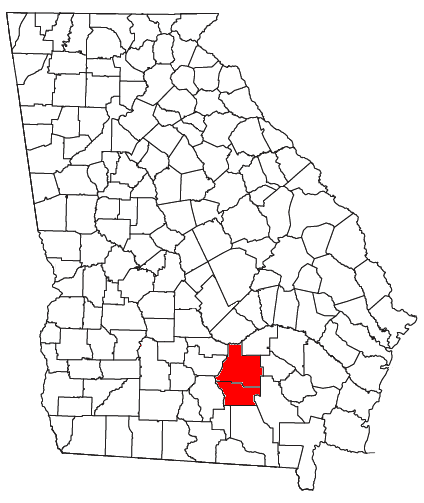
Location of the Douglas Micropolitan Statistical Area in Georgia

Douglas is the principal city of the Douglas micropolitan statistical area, a micropolitan area that covers Atkinson and Coffee counties and had a combined population of 50,731 at the 2010 census.

== Infrastructure ==
=== Highways ===
- U.S. Route 221 (runs north–south)
- U.S. Route 441 (runs north–south)
- Georgia State Route 31 (runs north–south)
- Georgia State Route 32 (runs east–west)
- Georgia State Route 135 (runs north–south)
- Georgia State Route 158 (runs east–west)
- Georgia State Route 206 (runs east–west)

=== Airport ===
- Douglas Municipal Airport

=== Utilities ===
- The Electric Department, locally owned and a member of the Municipal Electric Authority of Georgia, services Douglas with power.
- The Natural Gas Department, member of both Georgia & American Public Gas Association and the Municipal Gas Authority of Georgia, provides gas to the area.
- Water and sewer service is conducted by the city's Water Department.
- The Public Works Department handles yard clippings, junk items, and animal control for the city.

== Economy ==
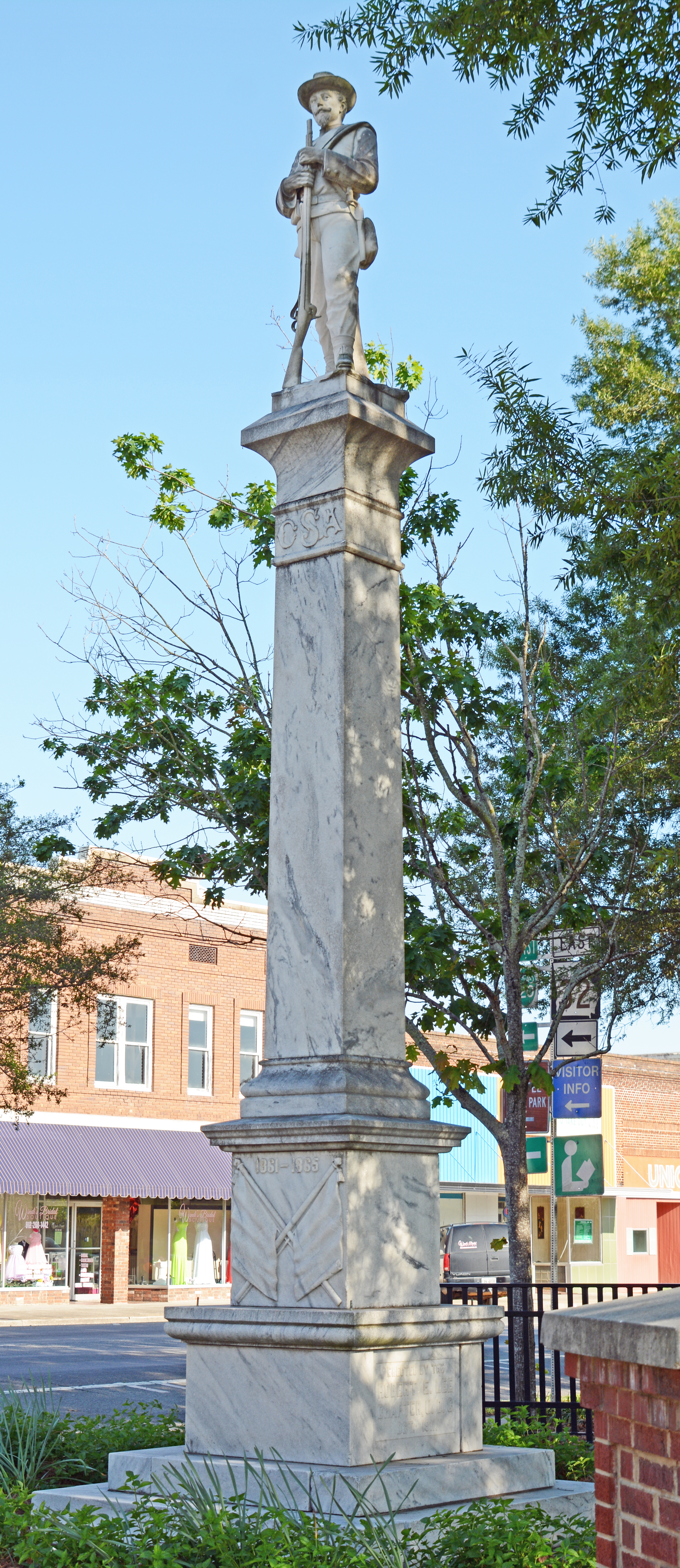
Confederate soldier memorial

=== Major employers ===
- Wal-Mart
- Premium Peanut
- Premium Waters
- American Insulated Wire
- Fleetwood Mobile Homes Corporation
- PCC Airfoils
- Pilgrim's

=== Agriculture ===
Farming plays a large role in the area's economy. Major agricultural products from the town and surrounding county include peanuts, corn, tobacco, and cotton. Chicken is also a major part of the economy.

=== Tourism ===
Douglas is home to Heritage Station Museum, which displays artifacts of the city's history. The World War II Flight Training Museum (the old 63rd Army Air Forces Contract Pilot School), Broxton is home to the Broxton Rocks, and the Ashley-Slater House are also popular tourist attractions in the area. All three were recently named among "Georgia's Hidden Treasures" in a segment on WSB-TV.

Douglas has ten public parks. There are four golf courses in and around the city.

Nearby, the 1,490 acres (6.0 km^{2}) General Coffee State Park draws more than 100,000 visitors a year and is the most popular tourist attraction in the area.

== Healthcare ==
- Coffee Regional Medical Center
- Coffee Regional Walk-In Clinic

== Media ==
- WOKA Dixie Country 106.7 FM
- WOKA Radio 1310 AM
- WOUG Radio Cielo 107.3 FM
- WULS Radio 103.7 FM
- WDMG Radio 97.9 FM, 860 AM
- WPNG Radio Shine 101.9 FM
- WSIZ Radio MyFM 102.3 @ 99.9 FM
- The Douglas News
- The Douglas Enterprise
- WSWG, CBS TV

== Education ==
=== Coffee County School District ===
The Douglas-Coffee County area is served by the Coffee County Board of Education. The Coffee County School District holds pre-school to grade twelve, and consists of eight elementary schools, a middle school, three high schools, and an alternative education center. The district has 438 full-time teachers and over 8,000 students.

- Ambrose Elementary School
- Broxton Mary-Hayes Elementary School
- Eastside Elementary School
- Indian Creek Elementary School
- Nicholls Elementary School
- Satilla Elementary School
- West Green Elementary School
- Westside Elementary School
- Coffee Middle School
- George Washington Carver Freshman Campus
- Coffee County Career Academy
- Coffee High School
- Coffee Alternative Education Center

=== Private schools ===
- First Academy at First Baptist Church provides preschool (1 year olds - 3 year olds), pre-kindergarten, and K-12.
- Citizens Christian Academy is K-12
- Douglas First Methodist Church provides pre-kindergarten

=== Higher education ===
- South Georgia State College is a public four-year institution of the University System of Georgia.
- Wiregrass Georgia Technical College

== Notable people ==
- Trevis Simpson, Basketball Player Eurocup
- James Brown, singer
- Tyreek Hill, National Football League player for the Miami Dolphins, formerly the Kansas City Chiefs
- Jason Childers, Major League Baseball player for the Tampa Bay Rays
- G. Wayne Clough, Secretary of Smithsonian Institution and former president, Georgia Tech
- Greg Holland, country singer
- Jennifer Nettles, one-half of the country music duo Sugarland
- Joel Parrish, football player
- Willie Spence, singer and runner-up of Season 19 of American Idol
- Maureen Tucker, drummer and occasional singer of 1960s and 1970s rock group The Velvet Underground, lives in Douglas.
- Greg Walker, former first baseman and hitting coach, Chicago White Sox
- Cathy Latham, former Coffee County GOP Chair
