= WOKA (AM) =

- Douglas, Georgia; United States
- Frequency: 1310 kHz
- Branding: 106.3 The Tree

Programming
- Format: Southern gospel
- Affiliations: Fox News Radio

Ownership
- Owner: Broadcast South (under LMA from Coffee County Broadcasters)

Technical information
- Licensing authority: FCC
- Facility ID: 12202
- Class: D
- Power: 500 watts day 68 watts night
- Transmitter coordinates: 31°31′24.00″N 82°52′22.00″W
- Translator: 106.3 W292FQ (Douglas)

Links
- Public license information: Public file; LMS
- Webcast: Listen Live

WOKA (1310 kHz) is an AM radio station broadcasting a southern gospel format. It is licensed to Douglas, Georgia, United States. The station is currently owned by Coffee County Broadcasters, Inc. and features programming from Fox News Radio.
