= Greatest Hits (Half Japanese album) =

Compilation album by Half Japanese
- Released: March 13, 1995
- Genres: Punk rock Alternative rock
- Label: Safe House
- Producer: Half Japanese

Half Japanese chronology
'Boo! Live in Europe 1992' (1994)	Greatest Hits (1995)	Hot (1995)

Greatest Hits is the first compilation album released by the punk rock band Half Japanese, in 1995. It includes the line ups from all albums released by the band.

== History ==
Half Japanese's Greatest Hits, which was the band's first compilation album, was released on March 13, 1995, after more than twenty years of activity as a band. By the time it came out, the band had gained an international fan base and it had already released thirteen studio albums; since the release of the compilation, there have been three more. Half Japanese later released two more compilation albums.

== Music ==
Greatest Hits is two discs and has at least one song from each album: from 1/2 Gentlemen/Not Beasts, with the band's original set, to Boo! Live in Europe 1992. The album features notable guests such as John Zorn and Eugene Chadbourne.

There are strong differences in the styles as well as the sound fidelity between the songs. It is possible to find noise and electronic tracks, such as the ones from 1/2 Gentlemen/Not Beasts; punk rock songs, like those from Charmed Life; experimental songs, such as those from The Band That Would Be King as well as more straightforward rock from other releases.

=== Critical reception ===
Professional ratings
Review scores
Source	Rating
Allmusic	link
Entertainment Weekly	(Favourable) link

Ned Raggett from Allmusic gave the album 4.5 stars of 5 calling it the best way to start with Half Japanese given the scattered discography of the band. He praised the songs "King Kong", "Amazing Clock" and "Identical Twins" as well as "How to Play Guitar", which, according to him, makes for a great final touch.

The album was included in Blender's top 100 indie rock albums, where it was called "undeniably difficult and triumphantly messy".

== Track listing ==
All songs written by Jad Fair unless indicated.

=== Disc A ===
No.	Title	Writer(s)	Original Album	Length
1.	"Firecracker (“Firecracker Firecracker”)"		Sing No Evil (1985)	2:42
2.	"Daytona Beach"		The Band That Would Be King (1989)	1:47
3.	"Said and Done"	Mark Jickling; J. Fair	Charmed Life (1988)	2:52
4.	"Dance When I Say Dance"	Half Japanese	Our Solar System (1984)	1:47
5.	"Postcard from Far Away"		The Band That Would Be King (1989)	1:42
6.	"The Worst I'd Ever Do"	Jad and David Fair	1/2 Gentlemen/Not Beasts (1980)	0:43
7.	"Horseshoes"		The Band That Would Be King (1989)	2:12
8.	"Open/Close Your Eyes (“Open Your Eyes/Close Your Eyes”)"		The Band That Would Be King (1989)	1:10
9.	"This Could Be the Night"		Fire in the Sky (1992)	4:39
10.	"Put Some Sugar on It"		The Band That Would Be King (1989)	2:50
11.	"Calling All Girls"	J. & D. Fair	“Calling All Girls” 7” EP (1977)	1:01
12.	"La Bamba"	Traditional	Music to Strip By (1987)	1:56
13.	"Love at First Sight"	Half Japanese	Charmed Life (1988)	2:44
14.	"Rub Every Muscle"	D. Fair	Sing No Evil (1985)	1:45
15.	"Silver and Katherine"	Jickling; J. Fair	Music to Strip By (1987)	3:13
16.	"My Sordid Past"	Half Japanese	Music to Strip By (1987)	1:30
17.	"Ride, Ride, Ride"		The Band That Would Be King (1989)	0:32
18.	"Day and Night"	Jickling; J. Fair	Charmed Life (1988)	2:52
19.	"Last Straw (“The Last Straw”)"	Half Japanese	Music to Strip By (1987)	1:22
20.	"Nicole (“Nicole Told Me”)"		Sing No Evil (1985)	4:30
21.	"Miracles Happen Every Day"		Charmed Life (1988)	2:16
22.	"U.S. Teens (“U.S. Teens are Spoiled Bums”)"	Half Japanese	Music to Strip By (1987)	1:08
23.	"School of Love"	J. & D. Fair	1/2 Gentlemen/Not Beasts (1980)	1:09
24.	"T. for Texas (“Blue Yodel No. 1 (T for Texas)”)"	Jimmie Rodgers	Previously unreleased	8:23
25.	"Colleen"	Half Japanese	Music to Strip By (1987)	2:33
26.	"Red Dress"		Charmed Life (1988)	2:15
27.	"Charmed Life"	Half Japanese	Charmed Life (1988)	1:46
28.	"Rosemary's Baby"	D. Fair	Horrible EP (1982)	1:32
29.	"I Know How It Feels... Bad"	Half Japanese	Loud (1981)	2:38
30.	"Roman Candles"	Fleming; J. Fair; Rick Dreyfuss	Charmed Life (1988)	2:20
31.	"Dream Date"	J. & D. Fair	1/2 Gentlemen/Not Beasts (1980)	1:45

=== Disc B ===
No.	Title	Writer(s)	Original Album	Length
1.	"Movin' on Up"	Bobby Gillespie; Andrew Innes; Robert "Throb" Young	Previously unreleased	2:17
2.	"No More Beatle Mania"	J. & D. Fair	1/2 Gentlemen/Not Beasts (1980)	1:53
3.	"How Did You Know?"		We Are They Who Ache with Amorous Love (1990)	1:34
4.	"Penny in the Fountain"	Jickling; J. Fair	Charmed Life (1988)	1:59
5.	"King Kong"	Daniel Johnston	A Tribute to Daniel Johnston Vol. 3 compilation 7” EP (1994)	3:29
6.	"Secret"		We Are They Who Ache with Amorous Love (1990)	2:16
7.	"B./C. Millionaires (“Bogue Millionaires / Cool Millionaires”)"	J. & D. Fair	1/2 Gentlemen/Not Beasts (1980)	2:14
8.	"Amazing Clock"	D. Fair	Previously unreleased	2:44
9.	"Thick and Thin"	Half Japanese	Music to Strip By (1987)	1:13
10.	"1,000,000 Kisses (“One Million Kisses”)"	Half Japanese	Charmed Life (1988)	1:55
11.	"Big Mistake"		BOO! Live In Europe 1992 (1992)	1:26
12.	"Little Records"	D. Fair	The Band That Would Be King (1989)	1:20
13.	"No Direct Line (“No Direct Line from My Brain to My Heart”)"	J. & D. Fair	1/2 Gentlemen/Not Beasts (1980)	2:01
14.	"The House I Live In"		We Are They Who Ache with Amorous Love (1990)	1:02
15.	"U.F.O. Expert"		Fire in the Sky (1992)	1:11
16.	"Identical Twins"	D. Fair	Previously unreleased	0:39
17.	"Double Trouble"		Sing No Evil (1985)	2:04
18.	"Evidence"	Jickling; J. Fair	Charmed Life (1988)	2:05
19.	"Stripping for Cash"	Half Japanese	Music to Strip By (1987)	1:22
20.	"On the One Hand"		Sing No Evil (1985)	3:28
21.	"Snake Line"	Jickling; J. Fair	Charmed Life (1988)	2:07
22.	"Too Much Adrenalin"	D. Fair	Our Solar System (1984)	1:28
23.	"Trouble in the Water"	Fleming; D. Fair	Charmed Life (1988)	3:00
24.	"Ball and Chain"	Willie Mae Thornton	Sing No Evil (1985)	3:03
25.	"Her Parents Came Home"	J. & D. Fair	1/2 Gentlemen/Not Beasts (1980)	1:02
26.	"Deadly Alien Spawn"		The Band That Would Be King (1989)	2:39
27.	"Ancient Life"	Half Japanese	Music to Strip By (1987)	1:36
28.	"Poetic License"	Half Japanese	Charmed Life (1988)	2:10
29.	"Uncertain Feelings (“Tell Me I'm Wrong”)"		Charmed Life (1988)	2:10
30.	"Something New... (“Something New in the Ring”)"	Half Japanese	Charmed Life CD bonus track (1988)	1:16
31.	"Fire to Burn"	D. Fair	Our Solar System (1984)	2:33
32.	"Acupuncture"	D. Fair	Sing No Evil (1985)	2:16
33.	"Salt & Pepper"		Previously unreleased	1:58
34.	"Guitar Solo"	J. & D. Fair	1/2 Gentlemen/Not Beasts (1980)	0:43
35.	"A Little Bit More"		I Like It When You Smile (Jad Fair solo album) (1992)	1:35
36.	"Mono (“I Don't Want to Have Mono No More”)"	J. & D. Fair	1/2 Gentlemen/Not Beasts (1980)	0:20
37.	"Better Than Before"		I Like It When You Smile (1992)	1:26
38.	"Everything is Right"	Fleming	We Are They Who Ache with Amorous Love (1990)	2:46

== Personnel ==
The people involved in the album are from the band's different line ups:

- Terry Adams – piano
- Pippin Barnett – drums
- Hank Beckmeyer – bass guitar, guitar, producer
- George Cartwright – saxophone
- Eugene Chadbourne – guitar, harmonica, vocals on "Blue Yodel No. 1 (T for Texas)"
- Byron Coley – liner notes
- David Doris – saxophone
- John Dreyfuss – saxophone
- Rick Dreyfuss – drums
- David Fair – guitar, percussion, vocals, liner notes
- Jad Fair – guitar, harmonica, vocals, producer
- Danny Finney – saxophone
- Don Fleming – guitar, vocals
- Tim Foljahn – guitar
- Fred Frith – guitar
- Mick Hobbs – guitar
- Scott Jarvis – drums
- Mark Jickling – guitar
- Steve Johnson – guitar
- Rob Kennedy – bass guitar
- Kramer – organ, bass guitar, guitar, keyboards, producer
- Eppo Krol – producer
- Richard Labrie – drums
- David Licht – conga
- Joe Martinelli – drums
- Lisa Mednick – keyboards
- Gilles V. Rieder – drums, producer
- Rebby Sharp – guitar
- John Sluggett – guitar
- Jay Spiegel – drums
- Maureen Tucker – drums, producer
- Jason Willett – bass guitar
- Gary Windo – saxophone
- Howard Wuelfing – bass guitar
- Lana Zabko – saxophone
- Don Zientara – producer
- John Zorn – saxophone
