= 1990 (Daniel Johnston album) =

1990 album by Daniel Johnston

Studio album by Daniel Johnston
- Released: January 1990
- Recorded: April 8–22, 1988
- Genres: Art rock; avant-folk; lo-fi; outsider; gospel
- Length: 40:03 (1990 LP version)
- Label: Shimmy Disc
- Producer: Kramer

Daniel Johnston chronology
It's Spooky (1989)	1990 (1990)	Artistic Vice (1991)

Professional ratings
Review scores
Source	Rating
AllMusic	4.5/5 stars

1990 is the eleventh album by American singer-songwriter Daniel Johnston. It was released in January 1990, through record label Shimmy Disc. Like Continued Story before it, 1990 was intended to be Johnston's first studio album, but had to be completed using live recordings and home demos.

== Background ==
=== Writing ===
Daniel Johnston wrote the album over four years between 1984 and 1988. The song "True Love Will Find You in the End" is possibly the earliest and had initially appeared on Johnston's December '84 demo tape Retired Boxer. In December 1985, an earlier version of "Funeral Home" appeared on his Continued Story album; later, in 1987, Johnston released an early version of "Don't Play Cards with Satan" on A Texas Trip. Johnston had spent the entirety of 1987 living in West Virginia with his parents; he was heavily medicated after a severe mental breakdown in December 1986 and found himself unable to write new material. The track "Some Things Last a Long Time" was co-written with Jad Fair, who Johnston first met in April 1988. Home demo versions of the songs "Held the Hand", "Don't Play Cards with Satan", and "Lord Give Me Hope" appeared on Johnston's Merry Christmas tape, released in December 1988.

1990 also features a cover of the Paul McCartney composition "Got to Get You into My Life" (credited to Lennon/McCartney.) McCartney stated he had written the song about marijuana, which had been earlier covered in Johnston's song "Pot-Head" on Songs of Pain. Johnston had been regularly smoking marijuana with his then manager before his mental breakdown in 1986.

=== Recording ===
1990 is made up entirely of recordings made during Johnston's April 1988 visit to New York City. During 1987 (his 'lost year'), Johnston's then-manager Jeff Tartakov was busy expanding Johnston's relationships with other contemporary acts, such as Jad Fair and Sonic Youth. Eventually, Johnston was invited by Steve Shelley of Sonic Youth to visit New York and do some recordings. In New York, Johnston first met with Jad Fair who co-wrote the track "Some Things Last a Long Time" and would later record the album It's Spooky with Johnston. While in New York, Johnston recorded at Noise New York Studios during sessions produced by Kramer. Tracks 1–5 and 8 were recorded during these sessions. Whilst at Noise New York, Johnston recorded with Moe Tucker and appeared on two tracks of her second album, Life in Exile After Abdication.

The visit was supposed to last for less than a week, with Johnston performing a handful of concerts to promote himself between the 15th and 18th, but Johnston remained in New York for twice that amount of time. Once he arrived there, he stopped taking his medication, which led to his increasingly erratic behavior.

The start of his unstable behavior was an arrest at the Statue of Liberty, where he was caught drawing Ichthys in the stairwell. Shortly afterward, on April 15, Johnston performed a 20-minute gig at Pier Platters in Hoboken, New Jersey. The show saw Johnston performing largely unreleased material, including "Spirit World Rising," the album version of which was recorded at Noise New York. The final six minutes of the concert, during which Johnston performs "Careless Soul" and "Funeral Home," from his Continued Story album, were included on 1990. Tartakov later said that Johnston was "proselytizing" the audience throughout the concert through religious monologues. The concert had led those around Johnston to believe that things were getting out of control and that he needed to be returned home. Shelley threatened to call Johnston's parents, which caused a fight between the two. Johnston was afraid he would be institutionalized again and so ran away. Along with the rest of Sonic Youth, Shelley eventually found Johnston in a hotel parking lot and attempted to convince him to return home. But Johnston was confident he was on a mission from God and had to stay in New York.

After this, Shelley, who Johnston had been staying with up until that point, asked Kramer to look after him for a few days, but after a few days together, Johnston attempted to return to Shelley. He was found by Kramer a few days later being thrown out of a hotel room. The next day Lee Ranaldo found him at a men's shelter in the Bowery, where Johnston was assaulted and lost some possessions. Eventually, some friends made arrangements to take him to the bus station and bought him a ticket home; where they thought they saw him get onto the bus. Two days later, Johnston was sighted again in New York City. On April 22, he was admitted into a mental hospital in Bellevue but was released that same day due to a clerical error and opened for Firehose at CBGBs that same night. The tracks "Tears Stupid Tears" and "Don't Play Cards with Satan" were recorded at this concert. Following the events of this week Johnston was dropped from Blast First before any release.

Johnston was eventually returned to his parents' home in West Virginia and recorded the album It's Spooky with Jad Fair in Maryland during August of that same year. There he recorded an alternate version of "Tears Stupid Tears" later included on CD versions of It's Spooky. Johnston was institutionalized upon his return to West Virginia after an elderly woman broke both her ankles fleeing Johnston out a window. Johnston had attempted to break into her home amidst a severe mental episode. He was placed into Weston Mental Hospital, where he would remain until after the album's release.

Johnston alludes to the album's troubled production in the film The Angel and Daniel Johnston – Live at the Union Chapel when he mentions that the album had originally intended to be called 1989, but they had not been able to release it that year. The LP was released on Shimmy-Disc in January 1990 to widespread acclaim.

Prior to the album's release, Jad Fair's band Half Japanese released their version of "Some Things Last A Long Time" on The Band That Would Be King. The version featured on that album does not feature Johnston's contributions. The album includes a cover of "I Live For Love" from Yip/Jump Music.

=== Artwork ===
Unlike Johnston's earlier ten albums featuring hand-drawn sketches by Johnston as their covers, 1990 instead features a photograph of Johnston pointing at a painting depicting a once-mighty tree, now reduced to a stump in a barren and desolate field, with a small but bright twig sprouting in front of it. It is one of Johnston's few paintings and represents eternal and undying hope. It is titled Hope. Johnston took inspiration from the piece and kept the painting in his home studio throughout the remainder of his life.

The photograph for the back cover of the LP was taken by Michael Macioce during the Noise New York recording sessions.

== Legacy ==
The album hosts some of Johnston's best-known songs, such as "Devil Town" and "True Love Will Find You In The End", but is considered "The toughest listen of all of Daniel's output."

In April 2021, Sharon Van Etten released an extended cover of "Some Things Last a Long Time", initially recorded for the film Feels Good Man. One month later, the Johnston estate released a music video for the song "True Love Will Find You In The End," made up of different performances by various artists. The Johnston estate then followed the video by announcing a 2xLP box-set titled The End Is Never Really Over, containing the extended CD version of 1990 and its follow-up, Artistic Vice. The set was released on August 29, 2021.

In 2026, the movie "Blue Heron" used Johnston's version of "Some Things Last a Long Time" as the music over the film's final credits.

== Track listing ==
All tracks are written by Daniel Johnston, except as noted.

Side one
No.	Title	Writer(s)	Length
1.	"Devil Town"		1:05
2.	"Spirit World Rising" (Ft. Lee Ranaldo & Steve Shelley)		6:14
3.	"Held the Hand" (Ft. Kramer)		1:42
4.	"Lord Give Me Hope"		6:25
5.	"Some Things Last a Long Time" (Ft. Kramer)	Johnston, Jad Fair	4:54
Total length:			20:20

Side two
No.	Title	Writer(s)	Length
6.	"Tears Stupid Tears" (live at CBGB)		3:27
7.	"Don't Play Cards with Satan" (live at CBGB)		4:23
8.	"True Love Will Find You in the End"		1:51
9.	"Got to Get You into My Life"	John Lennon, Paul McCartney	4:26
10.	"Careless Soul" (live at Hoboken, New Jersey)	James H. Stanley	2:23
11.	"Funeral Home" (live at Pier Platters, Hoboken, New Jersey)	based on "Cadillac Ranch" by Bruce Springsteen	3:13
Total length:			19:43

1990 CD Bonus Track
No.	Title	Writer(s)	Length
12.	"Softly and Tenderly"	Will Lamartine Thompson	4:50
Total length:			44:53

2008 Bonus Tracks
No.	Title	Length
13.	"Devil Town" (Demo)	0:35
14.	"Spirit World Rising" (Demo)	3:08
15.	"Held The Hand" (Merry Christmas version)	1:33
16.	"Tears Stupid Tears" (White Magic version)	4:13
17.	"Don't Play Cards With Satan" (Demo)	3:49
Total length:		58:11

== Personnel ==
- Daniel Johnston – vocals, piano (3, 4, 9), guitar (6–8, 11), front cover painting

Additional personnel

- Lee Ranaldo – guitar on "Spirit World Rising"
- Steve Shelley – drums on "Spirit World Rising"
- Kramer (Mark Kramer) – piano, bass, tape loops, backing vocals & whistling on "Some Things Last a Long Time"

Technical

- Kramer – production, engineering
- Macioce – sleeve photography

== Live at SXSW ==
Live At SXSW

Live album by Daniel Johnston
- Released: 1991
- Recorded: March 14th, 1990
- Length: 28:20
- Label: Stress Records
- Producer: Daniel Johnston

Daniel Johnston chronology
1990 (1990)	Live At SXSW (1991)	Artistic Vice (1991)

Singles from Live at SXSW
- 1. "Do You Really Love Me? / Speeding Motorcycle!" Released: 1990

Live At SXSW is a live mini-album by Johnston, recorded at South By South West on March 14, 1990, two months after his last album, 1990. Stress Records released the album in 1991.

=== Background ===
After a year of institutionalization, Johnston was invited to perform at the Austin Chronicle Music Awards and South By South West 1990 after the promoters heard he was stable and medicated. The performances were highly anticipated thanks to manager Jeff Tartakov's promotion and the releases of Merry Christmas, It's Spooky, and 1990, all put out during his institutionalization. Johnston was flown to Austin by his father, Bill Johnston and made two in-store appearances with hundreds in attendance. On that night, Johnston performed three 8-13 minute sets at The Palmer Auditorium, Waterloo Records, and Sound Exchange Records. The shows consisted primarily of newly written material, with the exceptions being re-worked versions of "Running Water," "Worried Shoes," "Casper The Friendly Ghost" & "Museum of Love" from his 1983 demo tapes. The shows featured no songs from the recently released 1990.

Unknown to anyone but himself, Johnston had been flushing his medication to prepare for the show, believing that it would be better the 'crazier' he was. This led to a delusional episode in his father's plane during the journey home. Johnston was reading a Casper The Friendly Ghost comic book, which featured the titular character skydiving, which fuelled his delusions. Johnston wrestled with his father, turned the engine off, threw the key out the window, and took the controls. Bill took the controls back and crashed the plane into a tree. The two got out safely and were found by their family. Johnston was hospitalized for five months, being released in August 1990.

A few months after the concert, the Palmer Auditorium version of "Do You Really Love Me?" was released as the B-Side to a re-recording of "Speeding Motorcycle" featuring Yo La Tengo.

Shortly afterward, "Do You Really Love Me?" would be retitled "Tell Me Now" and appeared on Johnston's following album, Artistic Vice.

=== Legacy ===
Johnston would re-record "Silly Love" for the album Fun and "A Lonely Song" and "Love Wheel" for his 2006 album Lost & Found.

In 1992, Jad Fair and the Pastels released a cover of "A Lonely Song". In 2005, Kathy McCarty released an abridged cover of "Love Wheel" on the extended version of her Daniel Johnston tribute album Dead Dog's Eyeball. For the 2006 Johnston tribute album I Killed The Monster, Kramer created a remix of 'Love Wheel' based on Emily Zuzik's cover. In 2010, Yeongene, a supergroup, featuring Duglas T Stewart, Francis MacDonald, Norman Blake & David Scott released a cover of "Do You Really Love Me?"

=== Track listing ===
All tracks are written by Daniel Johnston.

Side One (Live at Palmer Auditorium)
No.	Title	Length
1.	"Silly Love"	1:24
2.	"Running Water"	3:31
3.	"Casper"	3:40
4.	"Do You Really Love Me?"	4:02
Total length:		12:37

Side Two
No.	Title	Length
5.	"Worried Shoes" (Live at Waterloo Records)	3:03
6.	"Do You Really Love Me?" (Live at Waterloo Records)	3:45
7.	"Silly Love" (Live at Waterloo Records*)	1:23
8.	"A Lonely Song" (Live at Sound Exchange Records)	2:10
9.	"Love Wheel" (Live at Sound Exchange Records)	2:48
10.	"Museum Of Love" (Live at Sound Exchange Records)	2:35
Total length:		15:44

*Digital versions of the album list "Silly Love" as "Live at Waterloo Records," but it may be from the Sound Exchange set, as it opens with a cut in the tape and the audience applause bleeds into "A Lonely Song".
