= Artistic Vice =

Studio album by Daniel Johnston
- Released: 1991
- Recorded: July 1991; Chuck Picklesimer's house, West Virginia
- Genres: Outsider; avant-pop
- Length: 44:05
- Label: Shimmy Disc
- Producer: Kramer

Daniel Johnston chronology
1990 (1990)	Artistic Vice (1991)	Laurie (1992)

Singles from Artistic Vice
- 1. "Laurie" Released: April 1992

Artistic Vice is the first studio album by singer-songwriter Daniel Johnston, (following "1990") and his twelfth overall, counting his nine widely distributed demo tapes, an earlier aborted attempt at a studio album, (Continued Story), and a collaboration with Jad Fair, It's Spooky. The album is considered more light-hearted than its predecessor, 1990.

Unlike his earlier CD releases, this one features the same track listings as both the LP and cassette.

== Background ==
=== Writing ===
Following his year-long stay at Weston Mental Hospital, Johnston recorded the Laurie EP in December 1989, the title track of which is featured on this album.

A few months later, after the release of Johnston's 1990 album 1990 , he was invited to promote it with three short performances at SXSW. Instead of performing material from the album, Johnston debuted new material and reworked selections from his 1983 demo tapes. Johnston premiered four songs at these shows, "Silly Love", "Do You Really Love Me?", "A Lonely Song", and "Love Wheel". "Do You Really Love Me?" was eventually re-worked into "Tell Me Now", and the rest were shelved for future releases.

Immediately following the performances, Johnston was hospitalized for five months between March and August 1990, after causing his father to crash his plane into a forest amidst a delusional episode. During this period Johnston's popularity continued to rise, partially thanks to Homestead Records' continued re-issues of his earlier tapes, concluding in 1991 with a cassette / LP version of Continued Story, and the 'Continued Story / Hi, How Are You' CD. During this time, Firehose's cover of "Walking the Cow" was released on their album Flyin' the Flannel, and The Pastels released their cover of "Speeding Motorcycle", continuing to boost Johnston's notoriety as a songwriter.

The songwriting style on this album showcases Johnston's commercial ambitions, and slyly nods to his growing fame. The lyrics also refer to Johnston's improving mental state, in particular the song "I Killed The Monster" confidently boasts that Johnston had defeated his personal demons.

=== Recording ===
Although it is considered a "studio" album, the songs were actually recorded by Kramer in a make-shift studio in the garage at Chuck Picklesimer's house in July 1991, in Johnston's home state of West Virginia. For the album, he formed The Eye Band; a backing band made up entirely of Johnston's friends. The sessions were produced by Kramer, who was also responsible for his previous album, 1990. Although the sessions took place in West Virginia, by late 1991, the Johnston family had relocated to Waller, Texas.

The album is dedicated to Laurie Allen, Johnston's muse who he had not seen in over a decade at that point. A copy of the album had been sent to her. Johnston was thrilled to find she enjoyed the album.

== Critical reception ==
Professional ratings
Review scores
Source	Rating
AllMusic	4/5 stars
The Encyclopedia of Popular Music	3/5 stars
MusicHound Rock: The Essential Album Guide	2/5 stars
Spin Alternative Record Guide	3/10

Trouser Press called the album an "ebullient blast of lo-fi electric garage-rock," writing that "the glimmers of deliverance make this cogent album as encouraging as it is enjoyable."

== Legacy ==
Two years after the album was released, Television Personalities released a cover of "Honey I Sure Miss You". That same year, Terry Burrows, under the pseudonym of Yukio Yung, released a cover of "I Feel So High".

Canadian twee pop band Cub released a cover of "Tell Me Now" on their 1993 album Betti-Cola.

In 2004, Jad Fair and Teenage Fanclub collaborated on a cover of "My Life Is Starting Over Again" for the Daniel Johnston tribute album The Late Great Daniel Johnston: Discovered Covered. A few years later, in 2006, the album's producer Kramer performed bass and keyboards on a cover of "Honey I Sure Miss You". That same year, Jad Fair and Teenage Fanclub released a cover of "Happy Soul".

In a 2009 interview, Jeffrey Lewis cited Artistic Vice specifically as an influence on his songwriting.

In 2019, The New York Times included "My Life is Starting Over" in their list of Johnston's 12 essential tracks. The following year the album was reissued on vinyl as part of the box set The End Is Never Really Over. That same year Built To Spill covered "Tell Me Now" and "Honey I Sure Miss You" as part of their Johnston tribute album, and folk supergroup I Was A King, featuring Frøkedal, Norman Blake and Robyn Hitchcock, released their cover of "Honey I Sure Miss You".

== Track listing ==
All tracks are written by Daniel Johnston.

No.	Title	Length
1.	"My Life Is Starting Over"	2:06
2.	"Honey I Sure Miss You"	3:22
3.	"I Feel So High"	3:21
4.	"A Ghostly Story"	2:58
5.	"Tell Me Now"	3:28
6.	"Easy Listening"	2:09
7.	"I Know Caspar"	2:02
8.	"The Startling Facts"	1:54
9.	"Hoping"	0:46
10.	"It's Got To Be Good"	2:17
11.	"Happy Soul"	3:54
12.	"The Dream Is Over"	1:44
13.	"Love Of My Life"	2:36
14.	"I Killed The Monster"	3:57
15.	"Laurie"	2:23
16.	"Fate Will Get Done"	5:08
Total length:		44:05

2008 CD Bonus Tracks
No.	Title	Length
17.	"I Get Depressed When You Undress"
18.	"I Feel So High" (Demo)
19.	"Laurie" (Demo)
20.	"The Monster Inside Of Me"

== Credits ==
- Daniel Johnston: Vocals, Acoustic Guitar

Eye Band

- Brent Conkle & Donny Spencer: Lead Guitar
- Dale Dudgeon & Tom Gruda: Rhythm Guitar
- Mike West: Bass Guitar
- Fred McMahan: Drums

Production

- Kramer: Producer & Engineer
