= Merry Christmas (Daniel Johnston album) =

1988 album by Daniel Johnston

Studio album by Daniel Johnston
- Released: December 1988
- Length: 32:38
- Label: Stress Records

Daniel Johnston chronology
| Continued Story with Texas Instruments (1985) | Merry Christmas (1988) | It's Spooky (1989) |

Merry Christmas is the tenth self-released music cassette album by singer-songwriter Daniel Johnston, recorded in 1988. The back of the cover features a typed message from Daniel: "Thanks to everyone who's helped in the past year, especially those who have bought and played my album. Thanks again."

== Background ==
Merry Christmas was released three years following Johnston's last album, Continued Story. The period between Continued Story and Merry Christmas was one of increasing mental de-stability for Johnston, ultimately leading to his institutionalisation in August 1988.

In early 1986, Johnston won two awards in the Austin Chronicle, 'best songwriter' and 'best folk act.'

Shortly afterwards, in the spring, Jeff Tartakov set up his publishing company. Meanwhile, Johnston had been dating Kathy McCarty, but the two had broken up by June. Stress Records also began re-releasing Johnston's material at this time.

At this same time, Johnston had been spending a lot of time with his manager, Randy Kemper, smoking excessive amounts of marijuana and refusing to perform live; people also began noticing changes in his behaviour but were unsure what to do. Johnston later referred to Kemper as his best friend.

On September 11, 1986, Johnston attended a Butthole Surfers concert and was given acid. By December, Johnston was using the drug regularly and became more violent and delusional, resulting in an attack on Kemper, who was hospitalised after Johnston hit him over the head three times with a lead pipe.

During this time, Johnston began to see himself in the biblical figure Daniel, who Johnston cited as 'a dreamer and interpreter of visions', leading him to believe that his delusions were visions from God. By Christmas 1986, Johnston and his siblings reunited in Texas; whilst together, Johnston began acting strangely, placing a black number 9 and a Beatles LP on the Christmas tree. His brother Dick attempted to take the album down and was attacked by Daniel, who broke Dick's rib. Johnston began speaking in different voices and accused his siblings of teaching their children Satanist practices. Johnston then rushed up to the attic where his sibling's children were playing. Sally Johnston then called the police and had Daniel removed from the house. Shortly afterwards, Louis Black found Johnston at The University of Texas at Austin, where he preached in a river before being forcibly removed by the police. He later said he had been having suicidal thoughts only a few nights before and believed that a military takeover would take place over the holidays.

Following this, Johnston was institutionalised for the first time but was released by Jeff Tartakov, who self-admittedly didn't know why Johnston was there. He then began acting as Johnston's manager. Tartakov got Johnston back to his apartment and noted that everything seemed okay, at least at a borderline level, although Johnston had become more obsessed with The Devil as well as the number 9. Over the next few days, Johnston began to throw away all his possessions, including drawings and master tapes. The last time Tartakov visited Johnston's apartment; he only had his tape deck and guitar. Tartakov began to fear that Johnston would kill himself and called his father, who arrived in Austin within 24 hours. Daniel returned to West Virginia and announced his retirement.

Throughout 1987, Johnston was heavily medicated, finding himself often unable to leave his bed or write songs. He was psychologically examined at The University of Pittsburgh, and it was discovered that Johnston was on the wrong medicine. Johnston was prescribed many different types and reacted differently to all. He referred to 1987 as his 'lost year.'

At the same time, Jeff Tartakov attempted to expand Johnston's relationships with other contemporary musical acts, such as Jad Fair of Half Japanese and Steve Shelly of Sonic Youth. That year an early version of 'Don't Play Cards With Satan' featured on the Butthole Surfers produced album 'A Texas Trip'. It features an entirely different instrumental.

In April 1988, Shelly invited Johnston to meet him in New York City. He recorded at Noise Studios with Shelly and Lee Ranaldo, met producer Kramer and recorded with Moe Tucker. He also met with Jad Fair, and the two wrote the 'Do it Right'. During this trip, Johnston performed a 20-minute set at Pier Platters in Hoboken, New Jersey. Jeff Tartakov called the show bizarre, as it featured Johnston chastising the audience and 'forcing his religious beliefs on them. After the show, Daniel and Shelly had a falling out leading to Shelly threatening to call Daniel's parents. Fearing that his parents wanted to institutionalise him again, Johnston disappeared, leading Sonic Youth, who had been with Johnston, to search for him. They eventually found him in a hotel parking lot, but he was still refusing to go home, insisting he was on a mission from God and needed to stay for two more weeks. He believed that Satan was trying to stop him from leaving the town and ended up staying in the bowery, where he was assaulted and had his suitcase stolen. Eventually, some friends bought him a bus ticket to go back home and thought they saw him leave, but two days later he was seen back in New York.

On April 22, he was admitted into a mental hospital in Bellevue, before being released due to a clerical error and opening for Firehose at CBGB's that same night. Johnston performed 'Don't Play Cards with Satan' at this gig. He was eventually returned home to West Virginia, with a greatly increased reputation due to his New York hijinks. The album 1990 was created using audio recordings from this month, and includes alternate recordings of 'Held The Hand', 'Don't Play Cards With Satan' and 'Lord, Give Me Hope.'

In August, Johnston and Fair re-united in Uniontown, Maryland, to record the album 'It's Spooky'. During this period Johnston was dressed in all white, believing that it was the Christian thing to do. On the CD issue of that album, the track 'Casper The Friendly Ghost' featured is the same recording as that featured on Merry Christmas. At the time Johnston was not taking his medication.

On his way home, he got off the bus too soon. He became delusional and believed everyone around him had been possessed. Whilst he was making noise in the street, an elderly woman came to her window to tell him to be quiet. He began to pound at her door, terrifying the lady and causing her to jump out of her second-story window; leading her to break both of her ankles. Johnston was arrested and institutionalised at Weston Mental Hospital. Whilst being interviewed there, he stated that he believed demons were responsible for the woman's injuries. Merry Christmas was completed by Christmas of 1988.

== Recording ==
The album is largely made up of demos recorded throughout 1988, including some ('Held The Hand', 'Don't Play Cards With Satan' & 'Lord Give Me Hope') created in preparation for the recording sessions that made up his 1990 album, recorded in April 1988. The album also includes a singular studio track, from the then unreleased It's Spooky. The same recording of 'Golly Gee' was later included on the 2023 expanded re-issue of Johnston's 1981 Songs of Pain album, alongside seven otherwise unreleased tracks.

Other tracks were recorded later in the year, with the song 'Christmas In The Loony Bin' directly referring to his institutionalisation following the recording of It's Spooky. The opening track 'A Recorded Message', also refers to this.

The album continues to show Johnston influenced by 1960s pop, as well as religious hymns.

Johnston plays Piano, Chord organ, or Acoustic Guitar on the album. An extended version of Whiz Kid appeared on the Laurie EP in 1992, with a writing credit to Mark Hartenbach. The song, The River of No Return, takes its name from a ride at Six Flags AstroWorld, which Johnston operated during the summer of 1983. The ride closed in 1988 but by that point had been re-themed as The Wetlands.

== Legacy ==
Compared to Johnston's other albums, covers of 'Merry Christmas' material are somewhat of a rarity. In 1994, Kathy McCarty covered 'Golly Gee' for her 'Dead Dog's Eyeball' Johnston tribute album. Between 2006 - 2013, three different artist recorded versions of 'Held The Hand'; Joy Zipper recorded an extended version in 2006, Toby Goodshank recorded a version in 2011 and Adrian Crowley & James Yorkston recorded a version similar in length to the 1990 version.

== Track listing ==
All tracks are written by Daniel Johnston, except where noted.

Side one
| No. | Title | Writer(s) | Length |
|---|---|---|---|
| 1. | "A Recorded Message" | | 1:19 |
| 2. | "Where the Soul Never Dies" | William Matthew Golden (Uncredited) | 3:08 |
| 3. | "Held The Hand" | | 1:24 |
| 4. | "Golly Gee" | | 2:02 |
| 5. | "And Then She Kissed Me" | Phil Spector | 3:00 |
| 6. | "Casper The Friendly Ghost" | | 2:41 |
| 7. | "Christmas In The Loony Bin" | | 2:05 |
| Total length: | | | 15:39 |

Side two
| No. | Title | Writer(s) | Length |
|---|---|---|---|
| 8. | "Fool On The Hill" | Lennon-McCartney | 0:27 |
| 9. | "Don't Play Cards With Satan" | | 3:28 |
| 10. | "Laura Hadley" | | 3:24 |
| 11. | "Lord Give Me Hope" | | 5:41 |
| 12. | "Wiz Kid" | | 2:03 |
| 13. | "The River of No Return" | | 0:38 |
| Total length: | | | 15:41 |

== Personnel ==
Uncredited

- Daniel Johnston: Vocals, Piano on 3, 4, 6, 8, 10, 11, Chord Organ on 5, 12, 13, Acoustic Guitar on 7, 9
- Jad Fair: Drums & Backing Vocals on 'Casper The Friendly Ghost'

== Big Big World ==
Big Big World

EP by Daniel Johnston And The Rhythm Rats
- Released: August 1991
- Recorded: 1986
- Length: 12:49
- Label: Seminal Twang

Daniel Johnston chronology
| 1990 (1990) | Big Big World (1991) | Live at SXSW (1991) |

Big Big World is an EP by Daniel Johnston and The Rhythm Rats, recorded in 1986 between Continued Story and Merry Christmas. Unlike Merry Christmas, 1990, or It's Spooky; Big Big World features Johnston performing with a backing band, the three piece 'Rhythm Rats.'

=== Track listing ===
All tracks are written by Daniel Johnston.

| No. | Title | Length |
|---|---|---|
| 1. | "Big Big World" | 3:19 |
| 2. | "I Stand Horrified" | 1:09 |
| 3. | "December Blues" | 3:56 |
| 4. | "Hard Time" | 4:24 |

=== Credits ===
==== The Rhythm Rats ====
- Will Indian: Guitar
- Loose Reed: Bass
- Rusty Trapps: Drums

==== Technical ====
- Edited by: Eastside Flash
- Illustration by: Daniel Johnston
