= It's Spooky =

Studio album by Jad Fair and Daniel Johnston
- Released: January 1989
- Recorded: August 1988; Uniontown, Maryland
- Genre: Outsider music; indie rock
- Length: 42:41 (1989 LP version)
- Label: 50 Skidillion Watts

Daniel Johnston chronology
Merry Christmas (1988)	It's Spooky (1989)	1990 (1990)

Jad Fair chronology
Roll Out the Barrel (1988)	It's Spooky (1989)	Great Expectations (1989)

Professional ratings
Review scores
Source	Rating
AllMusic	2.5/5 stars
Pitchfork	6.3/10

It's Spooky is a collaborative studio album by American musicians Jad Fair (of the band Half Japanese) and Daniel Johnston. It was first released in 1989 through 50 Skidillion Watts Records, under the title Jad Fair and Daniel Johnston. Although receiving praise from critics and fans alike, the record was commercially overlooked. Both Johnston and Fair play the majority of instruments, including vocals, guitars, piano, keyboards and drums.

== Background ==
Jad Fair was first made aware of Daniel Johnston in 1985 when Johnston's then-manager Jeff Tartakov gave him a copy of Hi, How Are You while Fair was playing in Austin, Texas with Half Japanese. Three years later, in April 1988, Johnston was in New York City recording at Noise New York Studios, there he met with Fair for the first time. During these sessions, Johnston recorded two songs co-written with him and Fair, "Some Things Last a Long Time" and "Do It Right." "Do It Right" was recorded at a session between Johnston and Moe Tucker that Fair had organized. That track was eventually released on Tucker's second studio album, Life in Exile After Abdication. "Some Things Last a Long Time" later appeared on Johnston's 1990 album.

=== Recording ===
The song "The Making of the Album" details how the original plan was to record the album at Daniel's home in West Virginia in July, but it was rescheduled after Fair's car broke down. Johnston and Fair eventually reunited in Uniontown, Maryland in August. Jad Fair later noted that Johnston was dressing in all white during this period and stated that Johnston believed it was "The Christian thing to do". During their visit, Jad and his brother David had an idea to film a movie with Johnston, titled My Dinner with Daniel, which featured casual conversation between the trio, as well as musical performances from Johnston.

The album was completed in a single week. Fair later said it was very intense and that it was hard to keep up with all of Johnston's ideas. He was put in charge of recording the album and had to work around Johnston's reluctance to do more than a few takes. Johnston and Fair recorded most of the album in two takes; for the first take, Fair would focus on mic placement and recording levels, then join in for the second take. Fair had wanted to work on the project for a more extended period to smooth things out, but Johnston insisted that they finish it by the time he left town.

The album contains material co-written by Johnston and Fair as well as solo compositions by both and covers of Rodgers/Hammerstein, The Beatles, Paul McCartney, Phil Ochs, and Glass Eye. The latter act featured Kathy McCarty, who Johnston had previously dated. Johnston previously included an extended "Happy Talk" demo on his 1983 album The Lost Recordings. Shorter versions of the bonus tracks "Caspar [sic] the Friendly Ghost" and "Get Yourself Together" had both also been demoed in 1983, on Johnston's Yip/Jump Music and Hi How Are You tapes, respectively. A second demo of "Casper" appeared on Johnston's 1985 Continued Story album. An excerpt from the Jad Fair assisted version of "Casper" recorded in 1988 earlier appeared on Johnston's Merry Christmas album.

Soon after returning to West Virginia, Johnston was arrested and institutionalized. He had not been taking his medication at the time and, during an episode, caused an old woman to jump out of her second-story window while attempting to "cast out her demons." Johnston was institutionalized at Weston State Hospital.

=== Release ===
The album was released in 1989 by 50 Skidillion Watts as Jad Fair and Daniel Johnston, while Johnston was still institutionalized. Fair and Johnston originally wanted the project to be released as a double album, but it was ultimately cut down to a single LP. It was also released as a CD and a cassette, with four additional bonus tracks, including the full re-recording of "Casper" previously featured on Merry Christmas. In 1993, Paperhouse Records released a CD version in Europe retitled It's Spooky. This version featured six additional bonus tracks including an alternate version of "Tears, Stupid Tears" from Johnston's 1990 album, an extra Glass Eye cover, as well as a Butthole Surfers cover. In 2001, this version was released in the US by Jagjaguwar. For its 30th anniversary, the album was re-released by Joyful Noise Recordings, who put out a vinyl box set version which featured "Ashes on the Ground" as a bonus track, as well as a Flexi-Disc of "I Live My Broken Dreams".

== Legacy ==
Following the 2001 Jagjaguwar reissue, Pitchfork published a review of the album written by founder Ryan Schreiber. He referred to it as "Sometimes brutally irritating" and "unnatural," but it was also "the definitive recording of both artists' solo output." He also commented on the album's length, saying, "Its eternal length is just a testament to the boundless insanity raging within Daniel Johnston's confused mind." On the musical side, he said, "Johnston's irrelevant ramblings are often redeemed by his knack for writing great melodies" and that in their collaborations, Fair refined Johnston's melodies, but on later tracks, attempts to make them too avant-garde. Ultimately Schreiber gave the album a 6.3/10, and said "Beneath the din of disorganization, there are really some excellent songs."

The following year, in 2002, DQE covered "What I've Seen." In 2005, Dionysos included a cover of "I Did Acid with Caroline" as a hidden bonus track on their album Monsters in Love. The following year, Holy Sons released a short cover of "Nothing Left." In 2011, the Missing Leech covered "Frankenstein Conquers the World."

In 2015, the San Antonio Current published an article written by Shannon Sweet to highlight the cover of "Sweet Loafed" featured on the 1993 edition of the album. Sweet described the cover as "A trip through hell." She compared it to the Butthole Surfers' original, praising it for its lack of similarity, saying that its lack of production value and "Bitchin' virtuosic guitar solos" was the beauty of it. She noted that it was a song with no trace of pretension and called it a glimpse into the mind of Johnston. In 2018 two artists covered "Tears Stupid Tears," a song which earlier appeared on Johnston's 1990 album; the artists are Holy Sons and Nick Shoulders.

Following Johnston's death in 2019, several media outlets published retrospectives on Johnston, some briefly mentioning It's Spooky. The Irish Times cited it as an example of his less accessible work. For IndieWire's memorial piece on Johnston, Jeff Feuerzeig described the album, as well as Johnston's back catalog from 1981 to 1990, as "The most intimate, emotional, heartbreaking and brilliantly humorous listening experiences of my life."

== Track listing ==
All tracks are written by Daniel Johnston, except where noted.

=== 1989 LP version ===
Side one
No.	Title	Writer(s)	Length
1.	"It's Spooky"		1:54
2.	"Summertime"	Daniel Johnston, Jad Fair	3:03
3.	"I Met Roky Erickson"		2:30
4.	"Happy Talk"	Rodgers/Hammerstein	4:11
5.	"McDonalds on the Brain"		0:42
6.	"I Did Acid with Caroline"		1:43
7.	"If I'd Only Know"	Fair	1:54
8.	"Tongues Wag in This Town"	Johnston, Fair	1:08
9.	"Tomorrow Never Knows"	Lennon–McCartney	1:53
10.	"Oh Honey"		2:13
11.	"A Vow for Love"	Johnston, Fair	0:52
Total length:			22:04

Side two
No.	Title	Writer(s)	Length
12.	"When Love Calls"	Johnston, Fair	2:20
13.	"Frankenstein Conquers the World"	Johnston, Fair	2:21
14.	"Hands of Love"	Paul McCartney	2:03
15.	"Kicking the Dog"	Beattie, Cameron, McCarty, Lane	2:56
16.	"What I've Seen"		2:50
17.	"Something's Got a Hold of Me"		2:01
18.	"Villian"	Johnston, Fair	2:38
19.	"Chords of Fame"	Phil Ochs	2:55
20.	"Ostrich"	Johnston, Fair	0:32
Total length:			20:37

1989 CD / cassette bonus tracks
No.	Title	Writer(s)	Length
21.	"Caspar the Friendly Ghost"		4:15
22.	"First Day at Work"		3:03
23.	"Fun and Games"	Johnston, Fair	0:47
24.	"Nothing Left"	Johnston, Fair	2:15
25.	"Memphis, Tennessee"		1:15

1993 expanded edition bonus tracks
No.	Title	Writer(s)	Length
26.	"Come Back"	Beattie, Cameron, McCarty, Lane	2:57
27.	"Tears Stupid Tears"		3:01
28.	"The Making of the Album"	Johnston, Fair	1:51
29.	"Get Yourself Together"		1:24
30.	"What the World Needs Now"	Burt Bacharach, Hal David	3:03
31.	"Sweet Loafed"	The Butthole Surfers	2:45

2020 box set bonus tracks
No.	Title	Writer(s)	Length
32.	"Ashes on the Ground"	Daniel Johnston, Jad Fair, David Fair, Mark Jickling
33.	"I Live My Broken Dreams"
