= Charmed Life (Half Japanese album) =

1988 album by Half Japanese

Studio album by Half Japanese
- Released: 1988
- Genre: Indie rock, lo-fi, twee pop
- Length: 51:18
- Label: 50 Skidillion Watts

Half Japanese chronology
Music to Strip By (1987)	Charmed Life (1988)	The Band That Would Be King (1989)

Charmed Life is an album by the punk rock group Half Japanese, released in 1988. It is their second studio album released on their label, 50 Skidillion Watts.

The eighth song, "Bright Lights, Big City," was originally sung and recorded by the American blues musician Jimmy Reed, in 1961.

== Critical reception ==
Professional ratings
Review scores
Source	Rating
AllMusic	4.5/5 stars
Robert Christgau	B+
Pitchfork	8.9/10
Spin Alternative Record Guide	9/10

The Quietus wrote: "Less whiny and needy than Music To Strip By, the lyrics are spouted from a lip with more curl and less pucker ... as accessible as Half Japanese get." Trouser Press called the album "a guileless burst of optimism that mutes the shriller frequencies considerably, replacing them with an unaffected, exuberant guitar/harmonica backdrop played by a band."

== Track listing ==
No.	Title	Length
1.	"Said and Done"	2:53
2.	"Penny in the Fountain"	1:58
3.	"Evidence"	2:04
4.	"Vietnam"	2:00
5.	"Roman Candles"	2:22
6.	"Love at First Sight"	2:43
7.	"Snake Line"	2:08
8.	"Bright Lights, Big City"	2:10
9.	"Face Rake"	0:59
10.	"Later in a Magazine"	1:28
11.	"Red Dress"	2:16
12.	"Charmed Life"	1:47
13.	"Day and Night"	2:53
14.	"1,000,000,000,000 Kisses"	1:55
15.	"Terminator"	1:58
16.	"I'll Change My Style"	2:18
17.	"Charmed Life"	1:59
18.	"Trouble in the Water"	3:00
19.	"Miracles Happen Every Day"	2:20
20.	"Fortunate"	2:05
21.	"Poetic License"	2:08

Bonus tracks
No.	Title	Length
22.	"Day and Night"	3:51
23.	"1,000,000 Kisses"	2:06
24.	"Madonna Nude"	1:35
25.	"I'll Change My Style"	2:35
26.	"George Steele"	1:57
27.	"Real Cool Time"	8:54
28.	"How Many More Years"	2:13
29.	"King Kong Bundy"	1:53
30.	"Something New in the Ring"	1:15
31.	"Terminator"	1:56

== Personnel ==
- Jad Fair – guitar, harmonica, vocals
- David Fair – guitar, harmonica, vocals
- Don Fleming – guitar, vocals
- John Dreyfuss – organ, saxophone
- Rick Dreyfuss – composer
- Mark Jickling – bass guitar, guitar
- John Moremen – guitar
- Jay Spiegel – drums
- Don Zientara – engineer, mixing
