= Laurie (EP) =

- Digital release cover

EP by Daniel Johnston
- Released: April 1992
- Recorded: December 1989
- Genre: Indie
- Length: 10:24
- Label: Seminal Twang (UK)

Daniel Johnston chronology
Artistic Vice (1991)	Laurie (1992)	Fun (1994)

Laurie is an EP by singer-songwriter Daniel Johnston. It was his second release with Seminal Twang in the United Kingdom.

Johnston was gaining popularity and was soon to be picked up by his first major label, Atlantic Records, for the 1994 album Fun. Meanwhile, he had minor releases, including an earlier EP released by Seminal Twang called Big Big World.

== Background ==
=== Writing & Recording ===
The song 'Whiz Kid' dates back to Johnston's 1988 cassette Merry Christmas, on which a shorter version, only featuring the song's chorus, performed on chord organ features.

The EP was recorded in December 1989 in Johnston's bedroom in New Cumberland, West Virginia, just one month before Johnston's 11th album, 1990, was released. Recording sessions for 1990 had concluded over a year earlier, and Johnston had spent most of the time in-between institutionalized at Weston State Hospital. The 'Laurie' sessions were produced by Brett Hartenbach, who plays guitar on all tracks alongside Mark Hartenbach, who plays guitar and harmonica, and is credited as songwriter for 'Whiz Kid.' The tracks were mixed by Brett and Kevin Brown at Brown & Brown Recording Studios.

Three months later, Johnston performed at SXSW 1990. Although he played no tracks he had written for the still unreleased EP, he did debut four new pieces. He would later record one of them, "Tell Me Now", along with the title track from the Laurie EP, on his 12th album, Artistic Vice.

=== Release ===
The EP was released in April 1992 by UK based independent record label Seminal Twang, shortly after the release of Artistic Vice. In 2010 an extended version was released by Eternal Yip Eye Music, featuring 10 minutes worth of bonus tracks, made up of both short unfinished songs and early versions of tracks from Artistic Vice. The physical version features three songs omitted from the digital version, two of which are from the Merry Christmas album. The track "The Monster Inside of Me" also featured on the Spanish anthology album The Ruta 66 Album in 1991.

== Track listing ==
All tracks are written by Daniel Johnston except where noted.

Side one
No.	Title	Length
1.	"Laurie"	2:29
2.	"The Monster Inside of Me"	2:26
Total length:		4:55

Side two
No.	Title	Writer(s)	Length
3.	"Whiz Kid"	Mark Hartenbach	3:57
4.	"The Lennon Song"		1:32
Total length:			5:29

=== 2010 Special Edition ===
Side one
No.	Title	Length
1.	"A Recorded Message"
2.	"Christmas In The Looney Bin"
3.	"Some People Don't Even Know If It's Christmas Time"
4.	"Laurie (With Overdubs)"
5.	"Whiz Kid"

Side two
No.	Title	Length
6.	"The Monster Inside of Me"
7.	"Lennon Song"
8.	"I Feel So High"
9.	"Good God"
10.	"I'm in the Mood"
11.	"I Get Depressed When You Undress"
12.	"Lennon Song"

=== Digital Version ===
No.	Title	Length
1.	"Laurie"	2:32
2.	"Whiz Kid"	4:05
3.	"The Monster Inside of Me"	2:31
4.	"Lennon Song"	1:36
5.	"I Feel So High"	2:54
6.	"Good God"	0:44
7.	"I'm in the Mood"	0:33
8.	"I Get Depressed When You Undress"	1:30
9.	"Lennon Song"	1:46
Total length:		18:15

== Credits ==
=== Musicians ===
- Daniel Johnston: Piano, Guitar & Vocals
- Brett Hartenbach: Guitar
- Mark Hartenbach: Harmonica & Guitar

=== Production ===
- Producer: Brett Hartenbach
- Mixed By: Brett Hartenbach & Kevin Brown
