= Big City Orchestra =

American music group

- Origin: Los Angeles, California, U.S.
- Genre: Experimental noise
- Years active: 1979–present
- Website: https://ubuibi.bandcamp.com/

Big City Orchestra (BCO) is a long-running art/anti-art group and musical project based in California. They have a rotating cast of musician and non-musician members. They were formed in 1979 as the house band for a network of artist residencies in the South Bay area of Los Angeles.

== Releases ==
BCO sailed through the cassette culture movement of the 1980s and 1990s with nearly 130 hour-long releases on over 100 labels.

Other work has included four video collections, five 7″ singles, one 8″ single, one 10″ single, 10+ compact discs, well over 40 CD-Rs, and more than 300 compilation appearances.

=== A partial list of releases ===
- Baobab (Cass) Biotope Art Organization
- Bretagne (Cass, C60) Nihilistic Recordings
- Fresh Prezzies - Exclusive Tracks for Radio and Friends (CDr) ubuibi
- Gaiement (Cass) Le Réseau
- Mind Bent and Fancy Free (Cass) - Industrial Therapy Unit
- My Life in the Bush of Kate (Cass) - UBUIBI Ralph
- Pandora Flutter Tongue (Cass) - Ecto Tapes
- Planet of Giants (Cass) - Peuleschille Tapes
- Progressive Composition (Cass) - ZNS Tapes
- Rites of Wrong (Cass) - UBUIBI
- Seeds of Doom (Cass) - BloedvlagProdukt
- Sound Choice Cassette Culture Selection (Cass) Sound Choice
- Telegraphe (Cass) - New Flesh Tapes
- Untitled (Cass) - Kadef
- Verstimmt (Cass) - Ecto Tapes
- We Like Noize Too (Cass) - UBUIBI
- Tryst Ubiubi 1982
- Massacre of The Innocents (Cass, C90) - Sound Of Pig 1985
- Bob Hope's Fruit Loop Special (Cass, C60) - Audiofile Tapes 1986
- Edge of Destruction (Cass) - Swinging Axe Productions 1986
- Gateway of Fruit Loops (Cass) - The Subelectrick Institute 1986
- Massacre Again (Cass) - Tonspur Tapes 1986
- Parade of Idiots (Cass) - Bog-Art 1986
- Arc of Infinity (Cass) - Harsh Reality Music 1987
- Fury from the Deep (Cass) - Markus Schwill 1987
- Hand of Fear (Cass) - Calypso Now 1987
- Mile After Mile (Cass, C60) - Sound Of Pig 1987
- Mind of Evil (Cass) - The Subelectrick Institute 1987
- Myth Makers (Cass) - Nihilistic Recordings 1987
- Trail of Destruction (Cass, C60) - S.J. Organisation 1987
- A Good Time to Start Something New (Cass) - Epitapes 1988
- Absence Sharpens, Presents Strengthens (Cass) - GGE Records 1988
- Animal Religion (Cass) - Ralph Records 1988
- Everyman Is a Volume (Cass, C60) - Korm Plastics 1988
- In the Near Future (Cass) - Freedom In A Vacuum 1988
- Long Term Stimulation (Cass, Ltd) - SSS Productions 1988
- Magnetic Personality (Cass) - IEP 1988
- Web of Fear (Cass, C60) - S.J. Organisation 1988
- Aime-Morot (Cass) - Harsh Reality Music 1989
- Annual 1988 (Cass) - UBUIBI 1989
- Childhood Remembrances (Cass) - Seiten Sprung Aufnahmen 1989
- Headache Remedy (Cass) - Ecto Tapes 1989
- Oblivion Realized (Cass) - Minus Habens Records 1989
- Painfull Audio Enema (Cass) - Lowlife Audio 1989
- The Man of Steal (Cass, C60) - Audiofile Tapes 1989
- Bell, Book and Candle (Cass) - Tears Compilations 1990
- Prattling Box (Cass) - Tragic Figures 1990
- Resurrection Men (Cass) - Seiten Sprung Aufnahmen 1990
- Sounders; A Herd Of (Cass) - Industrial Therapy Unit 1990
- Tallywags (Cass) - Exo Product 1990
- Annual 1990 (Cass) - UBUIBI 1991
- The Four Cassettes of the Apocalypse (CD) - Subelectrick Institute 1991
- Beatlerape (CD) - Realization Recordings 1993
- Greatest Hits and Test Tones (CD) - Pogus Productions 1993
- Schall & Rauch (Cass) - Tonspur Tapes 1993
- So Much Dancing Then Nothing (Cass) - Old Europa Cafe 1993
- A Child's Garden of Noise (7", Ltd) - Drone Records 1994
- So Much Nearer Than Ubiquitous (Cass) - UBUIBI 1994
- Tryst 7 (Cass) - UBUIBI 1994 With the Legendary Pink Dots
- Grass b/w Grass (7") - Sick Muse Records 1995
- The Consumer (CD) - Commercial Failure 1995
- Tryst 8 (2xCass, Ltd) - UBUIBI 1995
- Anguilliform (Cass, Ltd, C60) - EE Tapes 1996
- Instructions for Use (CD) - Pure (US) 1996
- Aime-Morot (Cass) - HalTapes 1997
- And When We Get Homme, We Find Someone Else's Male (Cass)- FDR Tapes 1997
- And When We Wake Up, There Is Sheep in Our Eyes (Cass) - Doomsday Transmissions 1997
- Arc of Infinity (Cass) - HalTapes 1997
- Eek! (Cass, C60) - EE Tapes 1997
- Split Single (7") - Aquese Recordings 1997
- Untitled (Cass, Single, Ltd) - Doomsday Transmissions 1997
- When We Wake Up... (CDr) - HalTapes 1997
- Virus Radio Vol. I (Cass) - Mutant Cactus Recordings 1998
- Don't Let Him Touch You (Cass, Album, C60) - BLACK ORCHID Productions 1999
- Everyman Is a Volume (CDr) - Korm Plastics 1999
- Arc of Infinity (CDr) - Harsh Reality Music 2000
- Block Cedar Oakandstraw: Would (CDr) - Blade Records 2001
- Eurotour 2001 (CDr) - UBUIBI 2001
- New Beat for Baby (CD, Album) - Negative Foundation 2002
- Scarab (CDr) - EE Tapes 2002
- Can't We Just Have Sex Instead? (File, MP3) - Brokenwave 2003
- In a Persian Market (CDr) - Verato Project 2003
- Moisture (CDr) - Reduktive Musiken 2003
- Trixxy Pixxy (File, MP3) - Comfort Stand Recordings 2004
- Airre (CDr) - Entr'acte 2005
- Big City Orchestra (File, MP3) - Beta:Sound 2005
- Boom Crash Crash (File, MP3) - Comfort Stand Recordings 2005
- Kismet (File, MP3) - Umbrella Noize Collective 2005
- Progressive Composition (File, MP3) - ZNS Tapes 2005
- Things Fall Down (File, MP3) - Lostfrog 2005
- Azimuth (File, MP3) - Umbrella Noize Collective 2006
- Dada Is Dead, Long Live Dada (CDr, Album) - UBUIBI 2006
- Does Art For... (CDr) - Roil Noise Offensive 2006
- DoUBle the TroUBle (File, MP3) - Umbrella Noize Collective 2006
- Love Film Greats (CDr) - Roil Noise Offensive 2006
- Red Dog 9 (CDr, Album, Ltd) - UBUIBI 2006
- Signals and Code (File, MP3) - Umbrella Noize Collective 2006
- Drone Gnomes (10", Ltd, Mar) - Substantia Innominata 2007
