= Overjoyed =

Overjoyed may refer to:

- Overjoyed (Heo Young-saeng album), an album by Heo Young-saeng, 2012
- Overjoyed, album by William Galison
- Overjoyed (Half Japanese album), an album by Half Japanese, 2014
- "Overjoyed" (Bastille song), 2012
- "Overjoyed" (Jars of Clay song), 1998
- "Overjoyed" (Matchbox Twenty song), 2012
- "Overjoyed" (Stevie Wonder song), 1985
