= Horrible (disambiguation) =

Horrible is an EP by Half Japanese.

Horrible may also refer to:

- Mount Horrible, a summit in the Blue Mountains, Washington, United States
- "Horrible", a song by Frente! from the album Shape (album)
- "Horrible", a song by Jack Off Jill from the album Sexless Demons and Scars
