= European Son =

Song by the Velvet Underground

from the album The Velvet Underground & Nico
- Released: March 12, 1967
- Recorded: April 1966
- Studio: Scepter, New York City
- Genre: Experimental rock; psychedelic rock; noise rock
- Length: 7:46
- Label: Verve
- Songwriters: Lou Reed; John Cale; Sterling Morrison; Maureen Tucker
- Producer: Andy Warhol

"European Son", also known as "European Son (to Delmore Schwartz)", is a song by the American rock band the Velvet Underground, which appears as the final track on their 1967 debut album The Velvet Underground & Nico. It is also the album's longest track at more than seven and a half minutes.

With its long improvised outro, the song could be seen as a precursor to "Sister Ray" from the band's subsequent album White Light/White Heat.

== Composition ==
"European Son" is dedicated to poet Delmore Schwartz, who had been Lou Reed's advisor at Syracuse University. Wanting to dedicate a song to Schwartz, "European Son" was chosen because it had the fewest lyrics; Schwartz made his distaste for rock lyrics clear. The first pressing of The Velvet Underground & Nico listed the song as "European Son (to Delmore Schwartz)".

The song was recorded in April 1966; Schwartz died three months later, on July 14. According to musicologist Richard Witts, the song "reads like little more than a song of loathing" to Schwartz, who refused to see Reed towards the end of his life while living in self-imposed seclusion in Midtown Manhattan as his health failed. Witts highlighted obscure personal details in lyrics such as "You made your wallpapers green", and found the "Dylanesque" "hey, hey, bye bye bye" refrain "a malicious farewell" to Schwartz.

== Recording ==
The song begins with two stanzas of lyrics sung by Lou Reed over a D major chord played by Reed and Sterling Morrison and a walking bassline played by John Cale; about one minute later, a loud crashing sound produced by Cale hitting a stack of plates with a metal chair is heard. Six minutes of instrumental improvisation, making extensive use of distortion and feedback, follow.

== Personnel ==
- Lou Reed – vocals, electric guitar, sound effects
- John Cale – bass guitar, sound effects
- Sterling Morrison – electric guitar
- Maureen Tucker – percussion

== Covers ==
- Half Japanese on their 1984 album Our Solar System
- Thurston Moore on the 1988 compilation album The End of Music as We Know It
- Gary Lucas on his 2000 album Street of Lost Brothers
- Iggy Pop and Matt Sweeney on the 2021 Velvet Underground tribute album I'll Be Your Mirror

== Influence ==
"European Son" was an influence on the German krautrock band Can. Its influence can especially be heard on "Father Cannot Yell", the opening track of their 1969 debut album Monster Movie, which features bassist Holger Czukay playing a similar bassline.

A slowed-down version of the song's bassline appears on "Moby Octopad" by Yo La Tengo.

Simple Minds recorded a song entitled "European Son" on a demo tape, which was released on CD on The Early Years: 1977–1978. The band Japan also recorded a song with the title "European Son". Both these bands titled the song in tribute to the Velvet Underground song, and have covered other songs by the band (both covering "All Tomorrow's Parties", for one), but neither "European Son" is a cover of the Velvet Underground song.
