= 1/2 Gentlemen/Not Beasts =

1980 album by Half Japanese

Studio album with live tracks by Half Japanese
- Released: 1980
- Recorded: 1977–1979
- Genre: Punk rock; noise rock; no wave; lo-fi
- Length: 132:42
- Label: Armageddon

Half Japanese chronology
1/2 Gentlemen/Not Beasts (1980)	Loud (1981)

Professional ratings
Review scores
Source	Rating
AllMusic	4.5/5 stars
Christgau's Record Guide	C+
Pitchfork	9.2/10
Record Collector	4/5 stars
Spin Alternative Record Guide	8/10

1/2 Gentlemen/Not Beasts is the debut album by American rock band Half Japanese. Originally released in 1980 by Armageddon Records as a triple record, it was re-released in 1992 on CD on T.E.C. Tones with additional material. Fire Records reissued it again in 2013 on three-CD and four-LP sets on Record Store Day 2013 with further additional material, limited to 1,000 copies in each format.

== Style ==
The music has a sound more raw than garage rock, and has a very low fidelity recording. Most of the songs are originals with covers of a few of the band's influences interspersed. Most tracks are very loud and have an almost no wave sound, though some tracks are very meditative Krautrock-influenced instrumentals.

== Legacy ==
Half Japanese have played with many important artists of the experimental or alternative persuasion, such as Sonic Youth and Nirvana. Daniel Johnston made a record with Half Japanese's vocalist, Jad Fair.

== Track listing ==
All tracks are written by David and Jad Fair, except where noted.

No.	Title	Writer(s)	Length
1.	"No Direct Line from My Brain to My Heart"		2:00
2.	"10th Ave. Freezeout"	Bruce Springsteen	1:49
3.	"Ta Sheri Ta Ta"		4:32
4.	"My Girlfriend Lives Like a Beatnik"		1:04
5.	"Her Parents Came Home"		0:58
6.	"Shhh / Shhh / Shhh"		2:12
7.	"Girls Like That"		2:12
8.	"Rrrrrrrrrrrrrrr"		1:26
9.	"No More Beatle Mania"		1:52
10.	"Tangled Up in Blue"	Bob Dylan	3:44
11.	"Patti Smith"		2:22
12.	"School of Love"		1:07
13.	"Jodi Foster"		2:15
14.	"Shy Around Girls"		1:36
15.	"Grrrrrrrrrrrrrrrr"		2:24
16.	"Bogue Millionaires / Cool Millionaires"		2:10
17.	"Tn Tn Tn Tn Ki"		3:10
18.	"I Can't Stand It Any More"	Lou Reed	2:23
19.	"I Love Oriental Girls"		1:44
20.	"Dream Date"		1:32
21.	"Du Du Du / Du Du Du"		7:22
22.	"Ain't Too Proud to Beg"	Norman Whitfield, Eddie Holland	1:10
23.	"Ann Arbor. MI."		0:32
24.	"I'm Going to the Zoo"		1:13
25.	"Shi Yi Yi"		0:58
26.	"Rave On"	Sonny West, Bill Tilghman, Norman Petty	1:42
27.	"I Ta Nasi Si Na Mi Eee"		1:02
28.	"Till Victory"		2:16
29.	"Rip My Shirt to Shreds"		0:19
30.	"I Don't Want to Have Mono No More"		1:40
31.	"She Cracked"	Jonathan Richman	1:57
32.	"Bbbbbbbb/ Bbbbbbbbb"		1:36
33.	"Funky Broadway Medley"	Dyke Christian, James Brown, Johnny Rivers; incl. "Funky Broadway" by Dyke and the Blazers, "Papa's Got a Brand New Bag" by James Brown and "Got My Mojo Working" by Ann Cole and the Suburbans	4:12
34.	"I'm Sorry"		1:36
35.	"T / T / T / T / T / T"		6:43
36.	"The Worst I'd Ever Do"		0:43
37.	"Live in Baltimore MD" (incl. "Caroline Says" by Lou Reed, "Lisa Says" by Lou Reed, "I Saw Her Standing There" by the Beatles, "10th Ave. Freezeout" by Bruce Springsteen, "You're Gonna Miss Me" by 13th Floor Elevators, "I'm Going to the Zoo", "Femme Fatale" by the Velvet Underground, "John Jacob Jingleheimer Schmidt", "Wake Up Sleepyheads" by the Modern Lovers, "She Cracked" by the Modern Lovers, "Foggy Notion" by the Velvet Underground, "Farmer John, "Funtime" by Iggy Pop, "No Fun" by the Stooges, "Little Doll" by the Stooges, "I'm a Believer" by the Monkees, "Fun, Fun, Fun" by the Beach Boys, "Md. Girls (California Girls)" by the Beach Boys, "Shakin' Street" by MC5, "School of Love," "Patti Smith," "Battle of the Bands," "Mono," "Rip My Shirt to Shreds," "Oriental Girls," "Her Parents Came Home," "Rock & Roll Nurse" by Bo Diddley, "My Generation" by the Who, "Rock & Roll Heart" by Lou Reed)		20:19
38.	"Live in Washington DC" (incl. "Who Do You Love?" by Bo Diddley, "Rocket Reducer No. 62 (Rama Lama Fa Fa Fa)" by MC5, "You're Gonna Miss Me" by 13th Floor Elevators, "Live with Me" by the Rolling Stones, "Bogue Millionaires / Cool Millionaires," "Tangled Up in Blue" by Bob Dylan, "Femme Fatale" by the Velvet Underground, "John Jacob Jingleheimer Schmidt," "Almost Grown" by Chuck Berry, "College Psychology on Love" by Armand Schaubroeck Steals and "Nadine" by Chuck Berry)		18:16

1992 T.E.C. Tones CD reissue
No.	Title	Length
39.	"Battle of the Bands"	1:59
40.	"Worst I'd Ever Do"	0:42
41.	"Ann Arbor, MI"	0:53
42.	"School of Love"	1:31
43.	"Her Parents Came Home"	0:56
44.	"Shy Around Girls"	1:10
45.	"Dream Date"	1:43
46.	"Bogue Millionaires / Cool Millionaires"	3:29
47.	"Knock on Wood"	1:43
48.	"Top Secret"	0:47
49.	"Guitar Solo"	0:41
50.	"Calling All Girls"	1:04

2013 Fire Records reissue
No.	Title	Writer(s)	Length
51.	"Fool's Paradise"		1:22
52.	"Don't You Know That"		1:29
53.	"Foggy Notion"		3:19
54.	"If You're So Smart"		1:16
55.	"Interview"		2:11
56.	"Wildman"		1:24
57.	"Lo and Behold"		2:26
58.	"UFO"		0:48
59.	"Anything I Can Do"		0:59
60.	"Hey Romeo"		1:05
61.	"10th Ave. Freezeout"	Bruce Springsteen	1:48
62.	"Downdududown"		0:34
63.	"Man of Mystery"		1:30
64.	"One More Day"		2:11
65.	"Nobody"		0:53
66.	"Stooges Medley" (incl. "Funtime," "T.V. Eye," "Down On the Street," "Loose," "No Fun," "Not Right" and "Dirt." Written by David Alexander, Ronald Asheton, Scott Asheton, David Robert Jones, James Osterberg)		3:41
67.	"Wild Party"		3:03
68.	"Babylon"		2:38

== Personnel ==
Half Japanese

- Jad Fair – vocals, guitar, drums, illustrations
- David Fair – vocals, guitar, drums
- John Dreyfuss – saxophone
- Rick Dreyfuss – drums
