= Fire in the Sky (disambiguation) =

Fire in the Sky is a 1993 film that dramatizes the alleged UFO abduction of Travis Walton in 1975.

Fire in the Sky may also refer to:

== Music ==
- Fire in the Sky (album), a 1993 album by Half Japanese
- "Fire in the Sky", a song and compilation album by Jordin Kare
- "Fire in the Sky" (song), a 1981 and 1986 single by American country music group Nitty Gritty Dirt Band
- "Fire in the Sky", a song by Coldrain, from the 2015 album Vena
- "Fire in the Sky", a song by Darkest Hour, from the 2007 album Deliver Us
- "Fire in the Sky", a song by Hypocrisy, from the 2000 album Into the Abyss
- "Fire in the Sky", a song by Jukebox the Ghost, from the 2008 album Let Live & Let Ghosts
- "Fire in the Sky", a song by John Butler Trio, from the 2007 album Grand National
- "Fire in the Sky", a song by Kristoph Klover, from the 2004 album To Touch the Stars - A Musical Celebration of Space Exploration
- "Fire in the Sky", a song by Ozzy Osbourne, from the 1988 album No Rest for the Wicked
- "Fire in the Sky", a song by Anderson .Paak, from the 2021 album Shang-Chi and the Legend of the Ten Rings: The Album
- "Fire in the Sky", a song by The Midnight, from the 2020 album Monsters

== Other uses ==
- A Fire in the Sky, a 1978 television film
- "Fire in the Sky" (Transformers), an episode of The Transformers
- "Fire in the Sky", a 2002 episode of the television series Relic Hunter
- Meteors: Fire in the Sky, a 2005 History Channel documentary on meteor impacts narrated by David Ackroyd
- Fire in the Sky (Seekers), the fifth novel in the Seekers series

== See also ==
- Fire from the Sky, a 2012 album by Shadows Fall
