= Our Solar System =

1984 album by Half Japanese

Studio album by Half Japanese
- Released: 1984
- Genre: Indie rock, punk rock, lo-fi
- Length: 40:11
- Label: Iridescence

Half Japanese chronology
Horrible (1982)	Our Solar System (1984)	Sing No Evil (1985)

Our Solar System is an album by the rock group Half Japanese, released in 1984 by Iridescence.

It was reissued by Drag City in 2000.

== Critical reception ==
Professional ratings
Review scores
Source	Rating
AllMusic	2/5 stars
Robert Christgau	B
The Encyclopedia of Popular Music	3/5 stars
Spin Alternative Record Guide	5/10

The album received mixed to fair reviews. The Spin Alternative Record Guide wrote that "the playing is often too drowsy" and that "David's continued fear/objectification of women grows less cute by the minute."

== Track listing ==
No.	Title	Length
1.	"Dance When I Say Dance"	1:48
2.	"Girl Athletes"	2:12
3.	"Because I Love You"	2:15
4.	"Danger Danger Rachel Lang"	0:58
5.	"E.S.P."	3:31
6.	"Classical Music"	0:38
7.	"You're Gonna Miss Me"	4:40
8.	"Little Girls Have to Be Home Early"	1:03
9.	"Too Much Adrenalin"	1:32
10.	"Fire to Burn"	2:34
11.	"Rhonda"	0:30
12.	"Electricity Respect"	2:55
13.	"Knocked Down on the Dancefloor"	1:21
14.	"European Son"	2:53
15.	"There's a Girl"	0:51
16.	"Hall of the Mountain King/Louie Louie"	3:24
17.	"Young Hearts Break"	1:41
18.	"Did You Miss Me"	2:32
19.	"Thing with a Hook"	2:53

== Personnel ==
- David Fair
- Jad Fair
