= Music to Strip By =

1987 album by Half Japanese

Studio album by Half Japanese
- Released: 1987
- Genres: Indie rock, punk rock, lo-fi
- Length: 38:38
- Label: 50 Skidillion Watts
- Producer: Kramer

Half Japanese chronology
Sing No Evil (1985)	Music to Strip By (1987)	Charmed Life (1988)

Music to Strip By is an album by the Maryland rock group Half Japanese. It was the first album released on their label, 50 Skidillion Watts.

== Critical reception ==
Professional ratings
Review scores
Source	Rating
AllMusic	3/5 stars
Robert Christgau	B+
Pitchfork	8.4/10
Spin Alternative Record Guide	7/10

The Quietus wrote that "Music To Strip By [is] a rag bag of musical influences tied to tall tales with a verisimilitude to Jad's own beguiling, charmed life." The Spin Alternative Record Guide singled out the cover of Fats Domino's "Blue Monday" for praise.

== Track listing ==
No.	Title	Length
1.	"Stripping for Cash"	1:20
2.	"Thick and Thin"	1:11
3.	"Diary"	2:45
4.	"Big Mistake"	1:33
5.	"Hot Dog and Hot Damn"	0:44
6.	"The Price Was Right But the Door Was Wrong"	2:05
7.	"Blue Monday"	1:23
8.	"U.S. Teens Are Spoiled Bums"	1:10
9.	"Point/Counterpoint"	1:43
10.	"Sex at Your Parents' House"	1:27
11.	"The Last Straw"	1:20
12.	"Gator Bait"	1:17
13.	"La Bamba"	1:55
14.	"Colleen"	2:32
15.	"Ouija Board Summons Satan"	1:00
16.	"You Must Obey Me"	2:20
17.	"Salt and Pepper"	2:05
18.	"Ancient Life"	1:37
19.	"Silver and Katherine"	3:12
20.	"Money to Burn"	2:03
21.	"Hidden Charms"	1:19
22.	"How"	1:05
23.	"My Sordid Past"	1:32
