= Heaven Sent (Half Japanese album) =

1997 album by Half Japanese

Studio album by Half Japanese
- Released: 1997
- Genre: Lo-fi
- Length: 73:26
- Label: Emperor Jones

Half Japanese chronology
| Bone Head (1997) | Heaven Sent (1997) | Hello (2001) |

Heaven Sent is an album by the post-punk group Half Japanese, released in 1997.

The title track, over sixty minutes long, was a live recording for a radio broadcast on Radio 5 VPRO's De Avonden. The other nine tracks on the album are one-minute tracks.

== Critical reception ==
Professional ratings
Review scores
| Source | Rating |
|---|---|
| AllMusic | 4/5 stars |
| The Austin Chronicle | 3.5/4 stars |
| The Encyclopedia of Popular Music | 2/5 stars |

The A.V. Club gave the album a mixed review, describing the title track as intermittently "kind of cute" but also "impossible to listen to in its entirety." The Austin Chronicle called it "precisely the sort of ambitious, sprawling project that would send all but the most adventurous label honchos into cardiac arrest."

== Track listing ==
| No. | Title | Length |
|---|---|---|
| 1. | "Heaven Sent" | 61:40 |
| 2. | "Good & True & Fine" | 1:07 |
| 3. | "A Fine Line" | 1:22 |
| 4. | "Outer Space" | 1:35 |
| 5. | "Well Worth While" | 1:23 |
| 6. | "Better Than No" | 1:11 |
| 7. | "Dynasty" | 1:25 |
| 8. | "Goldfish & the Trout" | 1:11 |
| 9. | "This Is Our Night" | 1:17 |
| 10. | "The Day We Met" | 1:15 |
