= Bone Head =

1997 album by Half Japanese

Studio album by Half Japanese
- Released: 1997
- Genre: Rock
- Length: 46:09
- Label: Alternative Tentacles

Half Japanese chronology
Hot (1995)	Bone Head (1997)	Heaven Sent (1997)

Bone Head is an album by the rock group Half Japanese, released in 1997.

== Critical reception ==
Professional ratings
Review scores
Source	Rating
AllMusic	3/5 stars
The Encyclopedia of Popular Music	3/5 stars

The Chicago Tribune called the album "one of [the band's] best efforts to date: 21 infectious, sharply-etched rock miniatures scribbled with noise yet layered with hooks."

== Track listing ==
No.	Title	Length
1.	"Monkey Hand"	3:05
2.	"A Night Like This"	3:37
3.	"Sometimes"	1:53
4.	"Zombie Eye"	2:39
5.	"Song of Joy"	2:58
6.	"Oww"	1:48
7.	"Do It"	2:17
8.	"He Walks Among Us"	1:43
9.	"Diamonds And..."	2:55
10.	"Kiss Me Like a Frog"	0:48
11.	"Rhumba"	3:03
12.	"Intergalactic Aliens"	1:39
13.	"Celebration"	2:22
14.	"C'mon Baby"	2:10
15.	"Somehow I Knew"	2:08
16.	"Now I Know"	2:07
17.	"Brand New Sky"	1:58
18.	"Should I?"	2:06
19.	"Song of Joy"	2:36
20.	"Futuristic Lovers"	2:17
