= Hello (Half Japanese album) =

2001 album by Half Japanese

Studio album by Half Japanese
- Released: 2001
- Genre: Noise rock, rock
- Length: 53:16
- Label: Alternative Tentacles

Half Japanese chronology
Heaven Sent (1997)	Hello (2001)	Overjoyed (2014)

Hello is an album by the rock group Half Japanese, released in 2001 on Alternative Tentacles.

== Critical reception ==
Professional ratings
Review scores
Source	Rating
AllMusic	3/5 stars
The Austin Chronicle	3/4 stars
The Encyclopedia of Popular Music	3/5 stars

The Austin Chronicle called it "an excellent introduction to Half Japanese." Cleveland Scene deemed it "easily one of Half Japanese's most forceful and linear albums in years." The Chicago Reader wrote that the album "comes close to something recognizable as organized 'rock,' [but] still has that essential loopy charm."

== Track listing ==
1. "All the Angels Said Go to Her" - 2.47
2. "Patty" - 2.34
3. "Temptation" - 2.18
4. "The Legend of Hillbilly John" - 1.32
5. "Mississippi" - 3.48
6. "No Doubt" - 4.01
7. "10.00 AM" - 2.09
8. "Jump into the Mess" - 3.36
9. "Red Sun" - 2.07
10. "Whatever the Outcome" - 4.03
11. "Best of the Best" - 2.59
12. "Summer Nights" - 3.53
13. "Our Turn" - 4.27
14. "Starlight" - 1.48
15. "The Good Side" - 1.51
16. "Super-Size It" - 4.50
17. "Happyland" - 4.53
