= Fun (Daniel Johnston album) =

Studio album by Daniel Johnston
- Released: September 20, 1994
- Recorded: Summer 1994; Waller, Texas
- Genre: Alternative rock; outsider music
- Length: 45:53
- Label: Atlantic
- Producer: Paul Leary

Daniel Johnston chronology
Laurie (1992)	Fun (1994)	Frankenstein Love (1998)

Professional ratings
Review scores
Source	Rating
AllMusic	4.5/5 stars
Austin American-Statesman	3.5/5 stars
Chicago Tribune	3.5/4 stars
Entertainment Weekly	B+
Spin Alternative Record Guide	6/10

Fun is the second studio album by singer-songwriter Daniel Johnston, and his thirteenth album overall. It was his first major label release, as well as his only album for Atlantic Records. The album was produced by Butthole Surfers member Paul Leary. Two years after the release, Johnston was dropped from the Atlantic Records label.

== Background ==
=== Label courtship ===
By 1991, Johnston was institutionalized at the Austin State Hospital after relocating to Waller, Texas, with his family. During this period, Johnston's popularity continued to grow, with Kurt Cobain wearing a shirt featuring the Hi, How Are You cover in several publicity events, most notably at the 1992 MTV Video Music Awards. The shirt's visibility led to increased publicity for Johnston.

Around that time, Terry Tolkin contacted Johnston's manager, Jeff Tartakov, about signing him to Elektra Records. Tartakov, Tolkin, and Johnston met in the waiting room of Austin State Hospital and had a half-hour business meeting, resulting in a contract taking careful consideration into Johnston's situation. The label would provide Johnston with a physician, not require him to tour, and not drop him for failure to promote a record. Tartakov referred to this as "The most one-sided contract in favor of artists' rights that had ever been drawn up." Elektra intended to sign Johnston for his entire career, with eight records planned.

Over the next few months, Tartakov and Tolkin waited for Johnston's health to improve. Meanwhile, Tartakov was contacted by Yves Beauvais, Vice President of A&R for Atlantic Records, who was interested in signing Johnston. Tartakov told him they were close to signing with Elektra, which launched a bidding war with a $100,000 possibility.

Once Daniel was released from Austin State, he became paranoid about Elektra, worried that they were satanic and that Elektra recording artists Metallica would "beat and kill him." As such, the deal was abandoned. Tartakov eventually discovered he had been replaced as Johnston's manager by Tom Gimbel. Johnston had discovered Gimbel after visiting Austin-based record label Amazing Records. After giving the receptionist a tape, Gimbel recognised Johnston and followed him out to give him his card. Months later, Johnston hired Gimbel as his manager. Gimbel insisted he had no experience as a manager, but Johnston convinced him to try.

Within weeks of Gimbel's hiring, in February 1994, Johnston was signed to Atlantic. The new contract featured no provisions to deal with Johnston's illness, with an emphasis on releasing the album as soon as possible.

=== Writing ===
Johnston had written a majority of tracks at his piano between 1990 and 1994. The earliest traces of 'Fun' material date back to Johnston's March 14, 1990, live performances at SXSW, during which he premiered the songs "Silly Love" and "Love Wheel." This was during the writing of his previous album, Artistic Vice. In late 1992, Johnston performed a trio of live dates across Texas, the last of which, at the University of Houston, was recorded and released as Frankenstein Love in 1998. The setlist was largely made up of songs which would later appear on Fun, including "Mind Contorted", "Life in Vain", "Love Will See You Through", "Happy Time", "Crazy Love", "Rock 'n' Roll/EGA", and "Foxy Girl."

=== Recording ===
Beauvais was aware that Johnston's illness would make the album difficult to record; as such, he hired Paul Leary to produce. Leary later noted that Johnston had trouble playing instruments at the time, leading to Leary providing much of the backing. According to Beauvais, Johnston was suffering with severe lithium tremors, and his hands were too unsteady to play piano. Johnston would showcase the basic chord progression of songs to Leary, who would then work on the instrumentation and guitar tracks in a local studio owned by Willie Nelson. The vocals were overdubbed in Johnston's parents' garage, just outside Houston.

=== Release ===
'Fun' was released on September 20, 1994, selling 5,800 copies. Johnston was dropped by Atlantic in 1996. After this release Johnston would take a hiatus, but would eventually return with Rejected Unknown in 2001. During that period Johnston performed several live shows.

== Track listing ==
No.	Title	Length
1.	"Love Wheel" (Featuring Paul Leary & King Coffey)	2:20
2.	"Life In Vain" (Ft. Sandy Smallens, Paul Leary & Regina Carter)	3:22
3.	"Crazy Love"	1:13
4.	"Catie" (Ft. Paul Leary)	2:30
5.	"Happy Time"	2:54
6.	"Mind Contorted" (Ft. Paul Leary)	2:56
7.	"Jelly Beans"	1:24
8.	"Foxy Girl" (Ft. Paul Leary)	4:24
9.	"Sad Sac + Tarzan" (Ft. Paul Leary)	3:08
10.	"Psycho Nightmare" (Ft. Paul Leary & King Coffey)	2:05
11.	"Silly Love"	1:31
12.	"Circus Man"	1:30
13.	"Love Will See You Through" (Ft. Bobbie Nelson)	2:07
14.	"Lousy Weekend" (Ft. Sandy Smallens, Paul Leary, King Coffey & Regina Carter)	2:07
15.	"Delusion + Confusion"	2:44
16.	"When I Met You"	0:56
17.	"My Little Girl"	4:08
18.	"Rock 'N' Roll/Ega" (Ft. Paul Leary & King Coffey)	4:44
Total length:		45:53

== Credits ==
Adapted from album liner notes

- Daniel Johnston: Vocals, Keyboards on 7, 15, 17, Rhodes Piano on 3, 12, Guitar on 'Silly Love'

Guest Performers

- Paul Leary: Guitar on 2, 4, 6, 8, - 10, 14, 18, Bass on 1, 8, 10, 18, Drums on 1, 10, 18, Tambourine on 'Lousy Weekend', Backing Vocals on 'Rock 'N' Roll/Ega'
- King Coffey: Drums on 1, 10, 18, Tambourine on 'Lousy Weekend'
- Sandy Smallens: Bass on 2, 14
- Regina Carter: Violin on 2, 14
- John Hagen: Cello on 2, 5
- Bobbie Nelson: Piano on 'Love Will See You Through'

Technical

- Paul Leary: Engineer, Mixing, Production
