= Perfect (Half Japanese album) =

Studio album by Half Japanese
- Released: January 22, 2016
- Genre: Art punk, indie rock
- Length: 35:41
- Language: English
- Label: Joyful Noise Recordings
- Producer: Jad Fair, John Sluggett, Jason Willett, Mick Hobbs, Gilles Rieder

Half Japanese chronology
Overjoyed (2014)	Perfect (2016)

Perfect is the fifteenth full-length studio album by the art punk band Half Japanese. It was released by Joyful Noise Recordings on January 22, 2016.

== Track listing ==
No.	Title	Length
1.	"That Is That"	2:12
2.	"We Cannot Miss"	3:00
3.	"You and I"	4:17
4.	"Perfect"	2:50
5.	"Hold On"	3:07
6.	"Man Without a Shadow"	2:40
7.	"Here We Are"	1:42
8.	"Listen to Your Heart"	2:44
9.	"We'll Go Far"	2:51
10.	"That's Called Love"	2:44
11.	"In Your Spell"	2:04
12.	"A New Beginning"	1:38
13.	"That's Right"	3:52
