= Strange but True (album) =

Studio album by Jad Fair & Yo La Tengo
- Released: 1998
- Genre: Indie rock
- Length: 40:57
- Label: Matador Records

Professional ratings
Review scores
Source	Rating
AllMusic	2/5 stars
Christgau's Consumer Guide	(2-star Honorable Mention)
The Encyclopedia of Popular Music	3/5 stars
Entertainment Weekly	B
Pitchfork	4.9/10

Strange but True is a collaborative album by the band Yo La Tengo and Jad Fair. It was released by Matador Records in 1998. The song titles are taken from outrageous newspaper headlines. The lyrics were written by Jad's brother, David.

== Critical reception ==
The Chicago Tribune called the album "a mixed bag of gemlike pop, atmospheric narratives and abrasive textures." Spin deemed it a "supermarket tabloid rock opera."

== Track listing ==
1. "Helpful Monkey Wallpapers Entire Home" – 2:06
2. "Texas Man Abducted by Aliens for Outer Space Joy Ride" – 2:37
3. "National Sports Association Hires Retired English Professor to Name New Wrestling Holds" – 2:33
4. "Dedicated Thespian Has Teeth Pulled to Play Newborn Baby in High School Play" – 1:38
5. "Three-Year-Old Genius Graduates High School at Top of Her Class" – 1:17
6. "Embarrassed Teen Accidentally Uses Valuable Rare Postage Stamp" – 2:49
7. "Principal Punishes Students with Bad Impressions and Tired Jokes" – 1:24
8. "Retired Grocer Constructs Tiny Mount Rushmore Entirely of Cheese" – 1:51
9. "X-ray Reveals Doctor Left Wristwatch Inside Patient" – 0:50
10. "Clumsy Grandmother Serves Delicious Dessert by Mistake #2" – 1:01
11. "Retired Woman Starts New Career in Monkey Fashions" – 1:35
12. "Circus Strongman Runs for PTA President" – 3:19
13. "High School Shop Class Constructs Bicycle Built for 26" – 1:31
14. "Clumsy Grandmother Serves Delicious Dessert by Mistake #1" – 1:22
15. "Ohio Town Saved from Killer Bees by Hungry Vampire Bats" – 2:26
16. "Nevada Man Invents Piano with 21 Extra Keys" – 1:10
17. "Clever Chemist Makes Chewing Gum from Soap" – 2:00
18. "Minnesota Man Claims Monkey Bowled Perfect Game" – 1:34
19. "Ingenious Scientist Invents Car of the Future" – 1:29
20. "Car Gears Stick in Reverse, Daring Driver Crosses Town Backwards" – 1:48
21. "Shocking Fashion Statement Terrorizes Town" – 1:56
22. "Feisty Millionaire Fills Potholes with Hundred-Dollar Bills" – 2:41
