= The Band That Would Be King =

1989 album by Half Japanese

Studio album by Half Japanese
- Released: 1989
- Genre: Indie rock, punk rock, lo-fi
- Length: 46:17
- Label: 50 Skidillion Watts
- Producer: Kramer

Half Japanese chronology
Charmed Life (1988)	The Band That Would Be King (1989)	We Are They Who Ache with Amorous Love (1990)

The Band That Would Be King is an album released by the Maryland rock group Half Japanese. It was also their third and last studio album released on their label, 50 Skidillion Watts.

== Critical reception ==
Professional ratings
Review scores
Source	Rating
AllMusic	4/5 stars
Robert Christgau	B−
The Encyclopedia of Popular Music	3/5 stars
Pitchfork	8.6/10
Spin Alternative Record Guide	5/10

Trouser Press wrote that "a lot of the songs are fragmentary, and the music — a sloppy mess of guitars, harmonica and saxophones — sounds largely improvised, but a few tunes ('Some Things Last a Long Time,' 'Postcard from Far Away,' etc.) are genuinely delightful."

== Track listing ==
All tracks are written by Jad Fair, Don Fleming, J. Rice, Rob Kennedy & Scott Jarvis, except where noted.

No.	Title	Writer(s)	Length
1.	"Open Your Eyes/Close Your Eyes"		1:08
2.	"Daytona Beach" (Ft. Fred Frith)		1:47
3.	"Lucky Star"		2:21
4.	"Some Things Last a Long Time" (Ft. George Cartwright)	Daniel Johnston	2:20
5.	"My Most Embarrassing Moment"		0:49
6.	"Buried Treasure"		1:05
7.	"Open Book"		1:00
8.	"Little Records"	J. Fair, Fleming, Rice, Kennedy, Jarvis, David Fair	1:17
9.	"Deadly Alien Spawn"		2:36
10.	"Postcard from Far Away"		1:38
11.	"Ventriloquism Made Easy"		0:42
12.	"Something in the Wind"		0:38
13.	"Bingo's Not His Nam-o"		1:19
14.	"Put Some Sugar on It"		2:47

Side Two
No.	Title	Writer(s)	Length
15.	"What More Can I Do?" (Ft. Fred Frith)		1:24
16.	"Brand New Moon" (Ft. George Cartwright)		1:36
17.	"Another World"		1:34
18.	"Every Word Is True" (Ft. Fred Frith)		1:20
19.	"I Live for Love"	Daniel Johnston	2:06
20.	"Werewolf"		1:30
21.	"Ride Ride Ride" (Ft. John Zorn)		0:31
22.	"Sugarcane"		2:31
23.	"I Wish I May"		1:32
24.	"Ashes on the Ground"	Mark Jickling, David Fair	2:41
25.	"Curse of the Doll People"		0:33
26.	"Horseshoes"		2:11
27.	"Bluebirds" (Ft.George Cartwright)		1:39
28.	"Frankenstein Meets Billy the Kid"		0:56
29.	"My Bucket's Got a Hole in It"		1:11
30.	"Africans Built the Pyramids"		1:35

(last three only mentioned on label, not on the sleeve)

== Personnel ==
Half Japanese

- Jad Fair – vocals, guitar, harmonica
- Don Fleming – guitar, vocals
- Mr. J. Rice – guitar
- Rob Kennedy – bass
- Scott Jarvis – drums
- Kramer – organ, bass

Guest musicians

- Fred Frith – guitar on 2, 15, 18
- George Cartwright – saxophone on 4, 16, 27
- John Zorn – saxophone on 21

Production

- Kramer – recording, mixing, production
- David Fair – cover
