= Overjoyed (Half Japanese album) =

2014 album by Half Japanese

Studio album by Half Japanese
- Released: September 2, 2014
- Genre: Art punk
- Length: 39:53
- Label: Joyful Noise
- Producer: John Dieterich

Half Japanese chronology
Hello (2001)	Overjoyed (2014)	Perfect (2016)

Overjoyed is an album by the American art punk band Half Japanese, released on September 2, 2014, on Joyful Noise Recordings. It is their first album since Hello, released in 2001. It was produced by John Dieterich of Deerhoof.

== Critical reception ==
Professional ratings
Aggregate scores
Source	Rating
Metacritic	75/100
Review scores
Source	Rating
AllMusic	4/5 stars
Robert Christgau	(3-star Honorable Mention)
Consequence of Sound	C+
NME	8/10
Pitchfork Media	6.8/10
PopMatters	7/10
The Skinny	3/5 stars

According to review aggregator Metacritic, which compiles and averages reviews from well-known music critics, Overjoyed has a score of 74 out of 100, indicating generally favorable reviews. Paul McGuinness, writing in Record Collector, said that "Overjoyed is a brilliant album – quite probably the best new record from a guitar band all year." Mark Deming of AllMusic noted that the album is more cheerful lyrically than is typical for Half Japanese's work. Some critics gave the album mixed reviews; Adam Kivel wrote that the album's "clean production...too frequently redoubles the intentional toothlessness of the lines."

== Track listing ==
1. "In Its Pull"
2. "Meant to Be That Way"
3. "Brave Enough"
4. "Do It Nation"
5. "The Time Is Now"
6. "Our Love"
7. "Shining Star"
8. "Each Other's Arms"
9. "Overjoyed and Thankful"
10. "We Are Sure"
11. "As Good Can Be"
12. "Tiger Eyes"

== Personnel ==
- Craig Bowen - engineer
- John Dieterich - mastering, mixing
- Jad Fair - cover art, group member, layout, vocals
- Half Japanese - composer, primary artist
- Mick Hobbs - group member, guitar, organ (Hammond)
- Jared Paolini - engineer
- Gilles-Vincent Reider - drums, group member, melodica, percussion, synthesizer
- John Sluggett - group member, guitar, synthesizer, composer
- Jason Willett - bass guitar, group member
- David Woodruff - layout
