= Loud (Half Japanese album) =

1981 album by Half Japanese

Studio album by Half Japanese
- Released: 1981
- Genre: Punk rock, experimental rock, indie rock, art punk, lo-fi
- Length: 39:22
- Label: Armageddon

Half Japanese chronology
1/2 Gentlemen/Not Beasts (1980)	Loud (1981)	Horrible (1982)

Loud is an album by the rock group Half Japanese. It was released on the Armageddon label in 1981.

The album was the band's first release since the line-up was expanded with four new members (two saxophone players, a guitarist, and a drummer); it contains elements of free jazz. The album includes a cover version of the Doors' "The Spy."

It was reissued on compact disc in 2004 on Drag City, together with the Horrible EP, as Loud and Horrible.

== Critical reception ==
Professional ratings
Review scores
Source	Rating
AllMusic	3/5 stars
Robert Christgau	B
Spin Alternative Record Guide	9/10

The Spin Alternative Record Guide called it "Half Jap's finest hour, and one of the ultimate recorded documents of inchoate teenage angst."

== Track listing ==
No.	Title	Length
1.	"My Concentration, Oh No"	1:30
2.	"2 Hearts = 1"	1:06
3.	"If My Father Answers, Don't Say Nothing"	1:53
4.	"Scientific Devices"	0:55
5.	"Gift"	1:25
6.	"Dumb Animals"	3:45
7.	"Popular"	0:59
8.	"I Know How It Feels. Bad"	2:35
9.	"Perfume"	1:14
10.	"New Brides of Frankenstein"	1:58
11.	"Forget You"	1:03
12.	"Loud/Louder/Loudest"	1:06
13.	"Spy"	6:39
14.	"No Danger"	1:05
15.	"Love Lasts Forever (Sometimes)"	2:13
16.	"Nurse"	2:03
17.	"Only Dancing"	2:28
18.	"Bad to Your Best Friend"	0:58
19.	"Baby Wants Music" ((original title was “Freaks Wants Music“))	2:18
20.	"High School Tonight"	2:09
