= Fire in the Sky (album) =

1993 album by Half Japanese

Studio album by Half Japanese
- Released: 1993
- Genres: Indie rock; post-punk; punk rock; alternative rock
- Length: 62:06
- Label: Safe House
- Producers: Don Fleming, Maureen Tucker

Half Japanese chronology
We Are They Who Ache with Amorous Love (1990)	Fire in the Sky (1993)	Hot (1995)

Fire in the Sky is a studio album by the rock group Half Japanese, released in 1993. "Tears Stupid Tears" is a cover of the Daniel Johnston song.

== Critical reception ==
Professional ratings
Review scores
Source	Rating
AllMusic	4/5 stars
Robert Christgau	(3-star Honorable Mention)
The Encyclopedia of Popular Music	3/5 stars
Orlando Sentinel	5/5 stars
Spin Alternative Record Guide	7/10

Dean McFarlane of AllMusic called Fire in the Sky "the album that pushed the group from the obscure fringe of the U.S. post-punk underground into a full-blown indie rock legend." Trouser Press wrote that "Jad [Fair] works up a head of punk-rock steam that allows him to zoom manically through hi-energy blasts like 'U.F.O. Expert' and 'Tears Stupid Tears.'”

== Track listing ==
No.	Title	Length
1.	"U.F.O. Expert"	1:10
2.	"Tears Stupid Tears"	2:02
3.	"Always"	12:25
4.	"This Could Be the Night"	4:36
5.	"Possum Head"	2:41
6.	"Frosty"	2:45
7.	"Turn Your Life Around"	2:55
8.	"I Love a Mystery"	2:55
9.	"12 Houses"	1:55
10.	"Hanger 18"	3:06
11.	"Magic Kingdom"	2:27
12.	"It's No Wonder"	3:04
13.	"Fire in the Sky"	2:22
14.	"Good Luck"	0:55
15.	"Gates of Glory"	2:28
16.	"Everyone Knows"	2:30
17.	"I Heard Her Call My Name"	5:41
18.	"Eye of the Hurricane"	3:08
19.	Untitled (hidden track)	3:01

== Personnel ==
- Jad Fair – vocals, megaphone
- Don Fleming – guitar, vocals, organ
- Hank Beckmeyer – guitar, bass, backing vocal
- John Sluggett – drums, guitar, bass, backing vocal
- Maureen Tucker – drums
- Ira Kaplan – guitar
- David Doris – saxophone
