= We Are They Who Ache with Amorous Love =

1990 album by Half Japanese

Studio album by Half Japanese
- Released: 1990
- Genre: Indie rock, punk rock, lo-fi
- Length: 40:51
- Label: Ralph/T.E.C.

Half Japanese chronology
The Band That Would Be King (1988)	We Are They Who Ache with Amorous Love (1990)	Fire In the Sky (1992)

We Are They Who Ache with Amorous Love is an album by the rock group Half Japanese, released in 1990.

== Content ==
There are six cover songs, including "Gloria," a song by the band Them. Two songs were co-written with Daniel Johnston: "Titanic" and "Hand Without a Body."

== Critical reception ==
Professional ratings
Review scores
Source	Rating
AllMusic	3/5 stars

Trouser Press wrote that "with a rotating stack of fellow noisemakers, Jad manages to deliver some quietly cogent (if unexceptional) performances ('The Titanic,' 'All of Me,' 'Three Rings,' 'Secret' and a few others), but a sizable chunk of the record is unlistenably indulgent nonsense, noisy improvs in the musical sandbox." Magnet counted the album as among the band's "most accessible, most listenable."

== Legacy ==
Kurt Cobain of Nirvana ranked it his 37th favorite album on his top 50 favorite albums list, published in Journals.

== Track listing ==
No.	Title	Length
1.	"Every Hour"	2:46
2.	"Elevator Boy"	2:21
3.	"Gloria"	4:10
4.	"Ear"	1:34
5.	"The Titanic"	1:50
6.	"Our Eyes"	3:43
7.	"Spin"	0:42
8.	"Up and Down"	0:51
9.	"Run"	1:53
10.	"All of Me"	1:35
11.	"Hand Without a Body"	1:00
12.	"Going Home"	4:13
13.	"Three Rings"	1:47
14.	"How Did You Know?"	1:33
15.	"Then We Walk"	0:13
16.	"Secret"	2:16
17.	"Best"	2:10
18.	"The House I Live In"	1:01
19.	"Shanty Town"	2:26
20.	"Everything Is Right"	2:47
