= Hot (Half Japanese album) =

1995 album by Half Japanese

Studio album by Half Japanese
- Released: 1995
- Genre: Indie pop, punk
- Length: 40:25
- Label: Safe House (US); Fire (UK)
- Producer: Half Japanese

Half Japanese chronology
Fire in the Sky (1993)	Hot (1995)	Bone Head (1997)

Hot is an album by the rock group Half Japanese, released in 1995 by Safe House.

== Critical reception ==
Professional ratings
Review scores
Source	Rating
AllMusic	2.5/5 stars
Robert Christgau	(neither)
The Encyclopedia of Popular Music	3/5 stars

CMJ New Music Monthly gave the album a mostly positive review, praising "drummer Gilles Reider, who has no qualms about laying on the snare, and letting some speed-metal fills peek through the wall-of-punk." AllMusic called it a "nice mix between in-your-face noise and thoughtful, not too schticky indie pop."

== Track listing ==
=== CD version ===
No.	Title	Length
1.	"Drum Straight"	3:04
2.	"True Believers"	2:03
3.	"Well"	2:46
4.	"Dark Night"	2:48
5.	"Part of My Plan"	1:12
6.	"Vampire"	3:15
7.	"Lucky Ones"	5:36
8.	"Vast Continent"	3:04
9.	"Guess Again"	3:19
10.	"Black Fruit"	2:26
11.	"Sleep Talk"	3:23
12.	"Smile"	4:40
13.	"Lucky Town"	2:49
