= Sing No Evil =

1985 album by Half Japanese

Studio album by Half Japanese
- Released: 1985
- Genre: Indie rock, punk rock, lo-fi
- Length: 37:56
- Label: Iridescence

Half Japanese chronology
Our Solar System (1984)	Sing No Evil (1985)	Music to Strip By (1987)

Sing No Evil is the fourth studio album by the rock group Half Japanese, released in 1985 by Iridescence.

== Critical reception ==
Professional ratings
Review scores
Source	Rating
AllMusic	4/5 stars
Robert Christgau	A−

Craig Marks, in the Spin Alternative Record Guide, wrote that the album "finds Half Jap brushing up against normalcy--traditional song structures, metaphorical lyrics--with uneven, if sometimes booming, results."

== Track listing ==
No.	Title	Length
1.	"Firecracker Firecracker"	2:43
2.	"On the One Hand"	3:28
3.	"Too Bad About Elizabeth"	2:28
4.	"Dearest Darling"	2:53
5.	"Sing No Evil"	2:51
6.	"Double Trouble"	2:07
7.	"Rub Every Muscle"	1:50
8.	"Nicole Told Me"	4:34
9.	"Tell Me I'm Wrong"	2:11
10.	"Acupuncture"	2:17
11.	"I Have a Secret"	2:35
12.	"House of Voodoo"	4:49
13.	"Ball and Chain"	3:10
