= Continued Story with Texas Instruments =

Continued Story

Studio album by Daniel Johnston
- Released: December 1985
- Recorded: December 1985
- Studio: Europa
- Genres: Indie rock; folk
- Length: 37:17
- Labels: Stress (1987 issue); Homestead (1991 issue)
- Producers: Joe Johnson; Pam Peltz; Daniel Johnston

Daniel Johnston chronology
Respect (1985)	Continued Story (1985)	Merry Christmas (1988)

Professional ratings
Review scores
Source	Rating
AllMusic	4/5 stars
NME	5/10 stars
Spin Alternative Record Guide	6/10

Continued Story is the ninth self-released album by Daniel Johnston, released on cassette tape in 1985. The album includes a cover of the Beatles song "I Saw Her Standing There". It was released on CD in 1991 by Homestead Records and re-released in 2003 on a dual-album CD, along with the 1983 album Hi, How Are You, by Johnston's own label, Eternal Yip Eye Music.

== Background ==
In the eleven months between the recording of Retired Boxer and Continued Story, Daniel Johnston had been expanding his reach with local live performances in Austin, Texas. appearing at the Woodshock 85 festival with The Texas Instruments and on the MTV program The Cutting Edge. These appearances featured Johnston performing newly written non-album material such as 'I Live My Broken Dreams' and 'The Marching Guitars'. About a month following his appearance on MTV in August, Johnston stopped playing live shows; a decision referenced in the track 'Running Water Revisited.'

During this period, Johnston was still working at McDonald's. The managers there were aware of Johnston's popularity and were amused by it, so they expanded his weekly hours to 20 or 30. Additionally, Johnston didn't have a phone, and so the only way to contact him was through McDonald's, which eventually became an irritation for management.

=== Recording ===
Thanks to the publicity he was getting, Johnston attracted the attention of producer Kim Fowley, who was interested to hear what he would sound like in a studio environment. Fowley had organized for The Texas Instruments to act as Johnston's backing band and paid for the sessions but was largely uninvolved, only entering the studio on one occasion. Joe Johnson produced ten of the album's tracks at Europa Studios, with four additional tracks recorded elsewhere by either Johnston himself or Pam Peltz. The album also features two other guest performers, Bill Anderson, who co-wrote two of its tracks, and Rick Morgan, who appears only on 'It's Over.'

Johnston was pleased with the initial recordings but was shocked by the creative control Fowley had demanded afterward. According to Johnston, Fowley wanted more of Johnston's earlier material to be re-recorded, this time with additional saxophones.

When Fowley heard the finished album, he was disappointed and said that the songs sounded 'unfinished.' He also wanted Johnston to sign a contract that would have given Fowley full ownership over the masters, songwriting credit, and 50% publishing rights. Johnston refused the deal, and Jeff Tartakov, his manager at the time, obtained ownership of the album on Johnston's behalf, leading to Johnston's self-released version.

Sonically, the album showcases a more rock-oriented sound than that found in Johnston's earlier music, and is particularly stylized in the indie rock or pop-rock styles. Additionally, clear influences on the album include pop from the 1920s - 1930s, as well as the music of Lennon/McCartney.

Also included on the album are re-recorded versions of two tracks featured on two of Johnston's self-produced 1983 tapes, 'Running Water' from 'Hi How Are You' and 'Casper' from 'Yip/Jump Music'; however, neither of the re-recordings took place at Europa Studios.

Continued Story marks the end of an incredibly productive era for Johnston; between 1981 and 1985, Daniel had recorded nine albums but would not make his next until three years later.

=== Artwork ===
The album's artwork depicts a "Fly Eye",' a Johnston invention representing supernatural watchfulness. Johnston's other drawings of the Fly Eyes depict them as either comforting or sinister, watching over the world's every move, with Johnston referring to them as "Good/Evil". In the song "Fly Eye", Johnston attempts to calm one, in order to transform it into a less ominous constant companion.

== Legacy ==
A live recording of 'Funeral Home' would be included on Daniel Johnston's '1990' album. The '1990' version is triple the length of the studio take.

In 1993, The Fellow Travellers recorded a cover of 'It's Over' for 'A Tribute To Daniel Johnston Vol. 2', and the year afterwards, Kathy McCarty included the song as the final track on her 'Dead Dog's Eyeball' album; which is made up entirely of Daniel Johnston covers. In 2004, John Wayne Shot Me recorded a cover of 'Funeral Home' for their EP 'Let Sleeping Monsters Sleep.'

Singer-songwriter Beabadoobee revealed in a 2019 interview that she has a tattoo of the album's artwork, and in 2021, the Johnston estate released an NFT based on Daniel's Hi How Are You artwork featuring an instrumental excerpt from the track 'Fly Eye'.

== Track listing ==
All tracks are written by Daniel Johnston except where noted.

Side one
No.	Title	Writer(s)	Length
1.	"It's Over" (Ft. Rick Morgan)		3:15
2.	"Ain't No Woman Gonna Make a George Jones Outta Me" (Ft. Bill Anderson)	Johnston, Bill Anderson	2:43
3.	"Dead Dog Laughing in the Cloud" (Ft. Texas Instruments)		2:38
4.	"Funeral Home" (Ft. Texas Instruments)		0:52
5.	"Her Blues" (Ft. Texas Instruments)		1:30
6.	"Running Water Revisited"		2:09
7.	"I Saw Her Standing There" (The Beatles cover)	Lennon-McCartney	2:54
8.	"Casper" (Ft. Bill Anderson)		2:18
Total length:			18:19

Side two
No.	Title	Writer(s)	Length
9.	"Ghost of Our Love" (Ft. Texas Instruments)		1:51
10.	"Fly Eye"		1:59
11.	"Etiquette" (Ft. Bill Anderson)	Johnston, Anderson	2:57
12.	"A Walk in the Wind"		2:21
13.	"Dem Blues"		3:20
14.	"Girls" (Ft. Texas Instruments & Bill Anderson)		6:30
Total length:			18:58

== Credits ==
Adapted from CD liner notes

- The Texas Instruments – Guests on 'The Dead Dog Laughing In The Cloud', 'Funeral Home', 'Her Blues', 'Ghost of Our Love' & 'Girls'
- Bill Anderson – Guitar and backup vocals on 'Ain't No Woman Gonna Make A George Jones Outta Me', Guest on 'Casper', 'Etiquette' & 'Girls'
- Rick Morgan – Guest on 'It's Over'
- Randy Ross – Male vocals on 'Ain't No Woman Gonna Make A George Jones Outta Me'
- Pam Peltz – Female vocals on 'Ain't No Woman Gonna Make A George Jones Outta Me'

Production

- Joe Johnson – Producer on all tracks, except 'Ain't No Woman Gonna Make A George Jones Out of Me', 'Running Water Revisited' & 'Casper'
- Pam Peltz – Producer on 'Ain't No Woman Gonna Make A George Jones Outta Me' & 'Casper'
- Daniel Johnston – Producer on 'Running Water Revisited' & 'Etiquette'

== Release history ==
Year	Label	Format	Region	Notes
1985	Self Released	Cassette	USA	
1987	Stress Records	Cassette	USA	
1991	Homestead Records	LP / Cassette / CD	USA	CD includes 'Hi How Are You' as bonus tracks.
1991	Homestead Records	CD	USA	Includes 'Hi How Are You' as bonus tracks.
2006	Eternal Yip Eye Music / High Wire Music	CD	USA	Includes 'Hi How Are You' as bonus tracks.
2009	Eternal Yip Eye Music	CD	USA	Includes 'Hi How Are You' as bonus tracks.
2012	Eternal Yip Eye Music	Cassette	USA	
