= Calypso Now =

Publisher of music on cassette

Calypso Now was part of the cassette culture movement. Calypso Now was founded in 1983 by the Swiss musician and concert promoter Hotcha (alias Rudi Tüscher), located in Biel/Bienne. Up to 1989, about 200 cassette releases were produced, mainly from Switzerland, Germany, UK, USA and Canada. The label was reactivated in autumn 2010, with reissues and new cassette releases.

Calypso Now followed a licensing policy and often copied the cassettes on demand from master tapes of foreign labels, thus keeping the investment low. There were also bigger productions, mainly compilations of Swiss indie bands, targeted at record shops, with printed covers in the LP-sized 12" format Examples are This Is Guitar Town with bands from Geneva, Chart Attack, or a series of cassingles. Calypso Now also compiled tapes with Swiss underground artists for release by another label: Der Politische Katholizismus (1985) was released simultaneously in Japan, Germany and the USA; Sonique Suisse was initiated and released in 1988 by Carl Howard (at - Audiofile Tapes) in the US, and the Starspot Compilation was made in 1989 for Bi-Joopiter in the UK.
