= You're Gonna Miss Me (song) =

1966 single by the 13th Floor Elevators

Single by the 13th Floor Elevators

from the album The Psychedelic Sounds of the 13th Floor Elevators
- B-side: "Tried to Hide"
- Released: January 17, 1966
- Recorded: January 2, 1966
- Studio: Andrus Studios, Houston, Texas
- Genre: Psychedelic rock; garage rock; acid rock; proto-punk
- Length: 2:31
- Label: Contact; International Artists
- Songwriter: Roky Erickson
- Producer: Gordon Bynum

The 13th Floor Elevators singles chronology
"You're Gonna Miss Me" (1966)	"Reverberation" (1966)

"You're Gonna Miss Me" is a song by the American psychedelic rock band the 13th Floor Elevators, written by Roky Erickson, and released as the group's debut single on Contact Records in 1966. It was reissued nationally on International Artists, in May 1966. Musically inspired by traditional jug band and R&B music, combined with the group's own experimentation, "You're Gonna Miss Me" with its Stacy Sutherland and Tommy Hall-penned B-side "Tried to Hide" was influential in developing psychedelic rock and garage rock, and was one of the earlier rock compositions to use the electric jug. Accordingly, critics often cite "You're Gonna Miss Me" as a bona fide garage rock song and a classic of the counterculture era.

"You're Gonna Miss Me" reached number 55 on the Billboard Hot 100, making it the 13th Floor Elevators' only single to chart in the U.S. The failure of the song to achieve a higher chart listing is attributed to poor distribution by a non-established record label. In addition, the band was prevented from consistently touring during their parole for possession of marijuana. The song was also included as a track on their debut album The Psychedelic Sounds of the 13th Floor Elevators in October 1966.

In Canada, the song reached number 54 on the RPM Magazine charts.

== Composition ==
The song's lyrics are, for the most part, about a woman doing the singer wrong, and his boasting that "you're gonna miss me" after the two have separated, which is traditional to the template that many other garage rock bands had followed. An alternative motive to the song's concept was that the lyric, "you're gonna miss me", actually was directed toward songwriter Roky Erickson's extended absences from his family, which began when he was enrolled in junior high school. Erickson acknowledges that three compositions influenced the song's conception such as his musical role model, James Brown's "I Don't Mind", a key line of which is, "you're gonna miss me", as well as Buddy Holly's "Early in the Morning", and Muddy Waters' lesser-known recording, "You're Gonna Miss Me".

After entertaining the idea of embarking on a music career as a country singer, Erickson shifted to emulating the vocalization of rock and roll musical artists he held in high-regard, including James Brown, Little Richard, and Screamin' Jay Hawkins. However, perfecting his wails and screams took a level of considerable difficulty, and required a degree of privacy for Erickson, who wanted to project an impression that he was naturally talented. On occasions when he rehearsed, Erickson worked in seclusion with only a few close friends, and the results manifested itself on "You're Gonna Miss Me". During these practice sessions Erickson, at age 15, composed both "You're Gonna Miss Me" and "We Sell Soul". Both of the songs originally appeared in 1965 on a single released by Erickson and his group the Spades, gathering regional success and intrigue from contemporary musical acts. Among those impressed with Erickson were jug player Tommy Hall and lead guitarist Stacy Sutherland of another local band, the Lingsmen, who swayed Erickson to join their ensemble, which soon became the 13th Floor Elevators.

== Recording ==
The master recording of "You're Gonna Miss Me" was made on January 2, 1966 at Walt Andrus's studio in Houston, with record producer Gordon Bynum arranging the sessions. Prior to entering the studio, Erickson and bass guitarist Benny Thurman initiated last-minute rehearsals of both their old and experimental material, before concluding their safest move was to re-record "You're Gonna Miss Me", coupled with "Tried to Hide". With only a three-track available, the group was collectively recording live, reserving the other tracks for vocals and guitar. Hall's jug instrumental replaced much of Erickson's harmonica to aid in evoking the mind-altering experience of LSD, and attempt to "put the acid" into the song. According to Thurman, the band members were under the influence of the psychedelic drug throughout the recording process. The 13th Floor Elevators managed to record one perfect take of "You're Gonna Miss Me" in the early morning, but the playback was completely wiped from the tapes. Thurman brought an electric fiddle in hopes of utilizing the instrument on "Tried to Hide", left it on the mixing console, and the magnetic pickup consequently interfered with the recording heads.

Writer Austin Powell, in his 2011 book The Austin Chronicle Music Anthology, has noted that the influence of Little Richard's singing style is clearly heard in "You're Gonna Miss Me", with Erickson's primal shrieks and wailing. In addition to the composition's striking lead vocal, the song is also highlighted by Sutherland's precise and driving guitar motif and classic E-D-A-G chord progression. "You're Gonna Miss Me" exhibits the influence of John Coltrane, particularly in the distorted sound quality created by Hall's unique application of the electric jug. Hall was able to amplify the sound of the instrument by holding it near a microphone and through his vocal techniques. In his book The A to X of Alternative Music, music historian Steve Taylor also considers the hearsay from band members that Hall altered the pitch, and musical textures by varying the amounts of marijuana in his jug. The author goes on to conclude that the results garnered interest from listeners, and was expanded upon in the 13th Floor Elevators' later recordings.

== Release ==
"You're Gonna Miss Me" was released on January 17, 1966 on Bynum's newly established Contact Records (the name alluding to the "contact high" the music created), reaching number two in Austin, Texas. Following the single's release, the 13th Floor Elevators were drawing sold-out audiences as advertised psychedelic music artists on a weekly basis, but also attracted the attention of the authorities. This resulted in the band being busted for possession of marijuana, a report which circulated across Texas's music underground. Additionally, the group was barred from traveling outside the state or from performing at their regular venues the Jade Room and the Wig. The 13th Floor Elevators countered by having their debut at the new venue, the New Orleans, which was broadcast live on KAZZ-FM radio, and perversely their outlaw status won them a larger audience.

In May 1966, the group negotiated a contract with International Artists to distribute "You're Gonna Miss Me" in the U.S. The reissue peaked at number 55 on the Billboard Hot 100, on October 9, 1966 and spent two months on the charts. As a consequence of poor distribution, label confusion between International Artists, Contact Records, and Hanna-Barbera Records, and excessive bootlegging, the single failed to achieve a higher positioning nationally. Nonetheless, "You're Gonna Miss Me" managed to reach the Top 10 regionally in Miami, Dallas, Detroit, and San Francisco. At the height of their popularity, the 13th Floor Elevators performed the tune on Dick Clark's American Bandstand on October 29, 1966. Infamously, prior to their act, Clark asked who the head of the group was to which Hall replied, "We're all heads!"

In November 1966, "You're Gonna Miss Me" was featured as the opening track to the 13th Floor Elevators' debut album The Psychedelic Sounds of the 13th Floor Elevators. The song later appeared on the album Live, and the 1988 live album Live: I've Seen Your Face Before. It is also included on Nuggets: Original Artyfacts from the First Psychedelic Era, 1965–1968, The Collection, The Psychedelic World of the 13th Floor Elevators, and The Very Best of the 13th Floor Elevators Going Up. The Spades' original version was released in 1965 on Zero Records.

== Personnel ==
- Roky Erickson – lead vocals, rhythm guitar, harmonica
- Stacy Sutherland – lead guitar
- Tommy Hall – amplified jug, backing vocals
- Benny Thurman – bass guitar, backing vocals
- John Ike Walton – drums, percussion
