= Horrible =

1982 EP by Half Japanese

EP by Half Japanese
- Released: 1982
- Genres: Indie rock, lo-fi
- Label: Press

Half Japanese chronology
Loud (1982)	Horrible (1982)	Our Solar System (1984)

Professional ratings
Review scores
Source	Rating
Robert Christgau	B

Horrible is an EP by the rock group Half Japanese. It was released in 1982.

== Track listing ==
=== Vinyl version ===
Side one

1. "Thing with a Hook"
2. "Don’t Go to Bed"
3. "Rosemary’s Baby"

Side two

1. "Vampire"
2. "Walk Through Walls"
