= Half Japanese =

American punk rock band

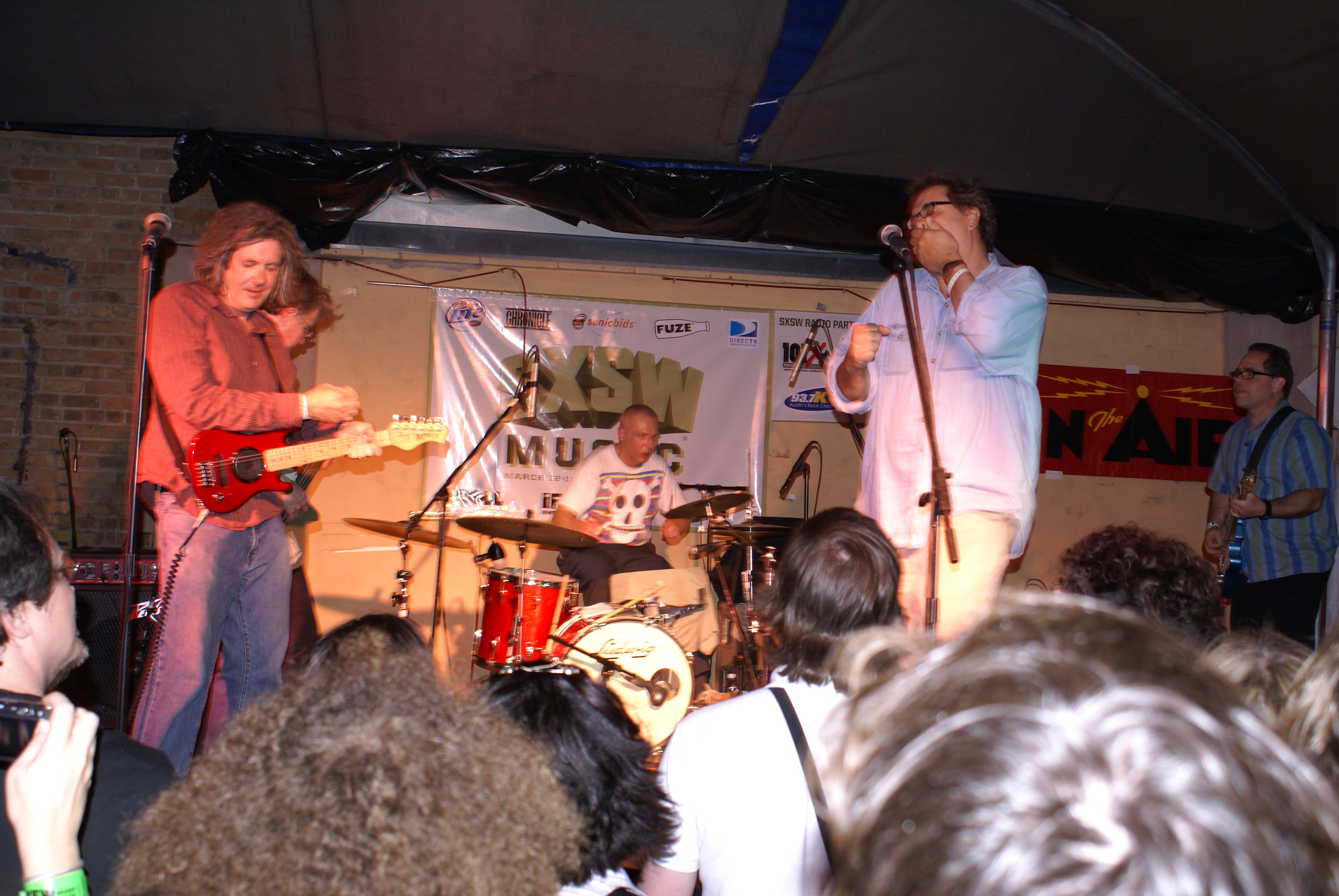
- Half Japanese at the SXSW Festival, March 2008

Background information
- Origin: Uniontown, Maryland, U.S.
- Genres: Art punk; indie rock; experimental rock; lo-fi
- Years active: 1974–present
- Labels: 50 Skidillion Watts; Safe House; Alternative Tentacles; Joyful Noise Recordings; Fire Records (UK); Emperor Jones; T.E.C. Tones; Psycho Acoustic Sounds
- Members: Jad Fair; John Sluggett; Jason Willett; Gilles Reider; Euan Hinshellwood
- Past members: David Fair; Mark Jickling; Howard Wuelfing; Don Fleming; Jay Spiegel; Henry Beckmeyer; Rick Dreyfuss; John Dreyfuss; Moe Tucker; Kramer; Rich Labrie; Mick Hobbs

Half Japanese is an American art punk band formed by brothers Jad and David Fair in 1974, after their family's relocation to Uniontown, Maryland.

Half Japanese's original instrumentation included a small drum set, which they took turns playing; vocals; and an out-of-tune, distorted guitar. Both Fair brothers sang, although over time Jad held the frontman role. As of the band's last several releases since the 1990s, according to the album and CD credits, Half Japanese composes and plays the entirety of the music while Jad, eschewing his role as guitarist from earlier albums, plays almost no guitar but is responsible for the vocals and lyrics, which typically divide into either "love songs or monster songs."

== Band history ==
Their lyrics often deal with monsters and the supernatural (especially as influenced by "creature feature" and sci-fi movies), in addition to more conventional themes, such as young love.

The band was formed in Jad and David Fair's bedroom in the mid-1970s, with sources varying on the exact date. The band released their first single, "Calling All Girls", in August 1977, followed by a triple album, 1/2 Gentlemen/Not Beasts in 1980.

The band played and recorded as a duo until the early 1980s, when they began incorporating additional members into the group: Mark Jickling (guitar and vocals) and brothers Ricky and John Dreyfuss (drums and saxophone). Since that time, dozens of musicians have come and gone under the Half Japanese banner, including Howard Wuelfing, Don Fleming and Jay Spiegel both from the bands B.A.L.L. and Velvet Monkeys, and Shockabilly bass player and Shimmy Disc impresario Mark Kramer among others. Jad is the only member who has been with Half Japanese from the beginning. David temporarily left the band in 1987 in order to take care of his family, and afterwards was involved with the band sporadically until his death in 2026.

The next line-up of Half Japanese came together in the late 1980s, proving to be a long-lasting and stable unit recording several albums and touring frequently throughout the United States, Europe, and Japan. This incarnation featured guitarist/multi-instrumentalist John Sluggett (also a longtime member of Moe Tucker's band), multi-instrumentalist Jason Willett, Mick Hobbs, and drummer Gilles Reider. Since then, the group has worked with Moe Tucker from The Velvet Underground, who produced and performed on Fire in the Sky (1992), as well as The Band That Would Be King (1989), and with Fred Frith, and John Zorn, among others.

In 1993, the band was brought to greater exposure when they opened for Nirvana's 1993 In Utero tour on dates in the US East Coast. Kurt Cobain would later wear a Half Japanese T-shirt when he died. The band's history and influence are chronicled in the 1993 documentary Half Japanese: The Band That Would Be King by Jeff Feuerzeig. In 1997, the band signed with the Alternative Tentacles label and released the album Bone Head. The same year, they self-released the album Heaven Sent on the label of drummer Gilles-Vincent Reider. In 2001, they released their second album on Alternative Tentacles, Hello.

The band was chosen by Jeff Mangum of Neutral Milk Hotel to perform at the All Tomorrow's Parties festival that he curated in March 2012 in Minehead. In September 2014, the band released the album Overjoyed on Joyful Noise Recordings, their first in 13 years, which was followed by the limited edition Bingo Ringo EP the following year. The band subsequently moved to Fire Records released the albums Hear the Lions Roar in 2017, Why Not? in 2018, Invincible in 2019 and Crazy Hearts in 2020. In 2021, I Guess I'm Living: The Charmed Life Tapes, an alternate recording of their 1988 album Charmed Life containing previously unreleased material was released exclusively on Record Store Day. July 2023 saw their twentieth studio album, Jump into Love.

Mick Hobbs died on January 3, 2025, at the age of 69. David Fair died on August 29, 2026 at the age of 74, after a protracted battle with cancer.

== Band members ==
Current lineup

- Jad Fair – vocals, guitar, drums, artwork, occasional saxophone, harmonica, percussion and organ (1974–present)
- John Sluggett – guitar, drums, keyboards, bass, backing vocals (1990–present)
- Jason Willett – bass, keyboards, guitar (1990, 1995–1997, 2001–present)
- Gilles Reider – drums, percussion, keyboards, melodica (1990–present)
- Euan Hinshellwood – guitar, saxophone, harmonica, keyboards (2025–present)

Former members and collaborators

- David Fair – vocals, guitar, drums, occasional artwork and harmonica (1974–1987, occasional appearances until 2026; died 2026)
- John Dreyfuss – saxophone, organ, occasional percussion (1979–1988)
- Rick Dreyfuss – drums (1979–1982)
- Mark Jickling – bass, guitar, backing vocals (1982, 1987–1989)
- Howard Wuelfing – bass (1982–1984)
- Lana Zabko – saxophone (1982)
- Rich Labrie – drums (1984)
- Steve Johnson – guitar (1987)
- Rob Kennedy – bass (1987–1989)
- Scott Jarvis – drums (1987, 1989)
- Don Fleming – guitar, vocals, organ (1988–1989, 1993)
- Jay Spiegel – drums (1988)
- Mark Kramer – organ, bass, producer (1989)
- Henry Beckmeyer – guitar, bass, backing vocals (1990–1993)
- Mick Hobbs – guitar, bass, keyboards (1990, 1995–1997, 2014–2025; died 2025)
- Moe Tucker – guitar, drums, producer (1993)
- Jerome Doudet – bass (1997)
- Steve Petter – guitar (1997)
- Dallas Good – bass, guitar, vocals (1997–2001; died 2022)

Timeline

== Discography ==
=== Studio albums ===
- Half Gentlemen/Not Beasts (Armageddon, 1980)
- Loud (Armageddon, 1981)
- Our Solar System (Iridescence, 1984)
- Sing No Evil (Iridescence, 1985)
- Music To Strip By (50 Skidillion Watts, 1987)
- Charmed Life (50 Skidillion Watts, 1988)
- The Band That Would Be King (50 Skidillion Watts, 1989)
- We Are They Who Ache with Amorous Love (TEC Tones, 1990)
- Fire In The Sky (Paperhouse, 1992)
- Hot (Safe House, 1995)
- Bone Head (Alternative Tentacles, 1997)
- Heaven Sent (Emperor Jones, 1997)
- Hello (Alternative Tentacles, 2001)
- Overjoyed (Joyful Noise, 2014)
- Perfect (Joyful Noise, 2016)
- Hear the Lions Roar (Fire Records, 2017)
- Why Not? (Fire Records, 2018)
- Invincible (Fire Records, 2019)
- Crazy Hearts (Fire Records, 2020)
- I Guess I'm Living: The Charmed Life Tapes (Fire Records, 2021)
- Jump into Love (Fire Records, 2023)
- Adventure (Fire Records, 2025)

=== Live albums ===
- Half Alive (Cassette - live at DC Space and the Red Door, Baltimore - 50 Skidillion Watts, 1977)
- 50 Skidillion Watts Live (Calypso Now, 1984)
- Boo: Live in Europe 1992 (TEC Tones, 1994)

=== Compilation albums ===
- Best Of Half Japanese (Timebomb Japan, 1993)
- Greatest Hits 2 CDs / 3 LPs (Safe House, 1995)
- Best Of Half Japanese Vol. 2 (Timebomb Japan, 1995)

=== EPs ===
- "Calling All Girls" (50 Skidillion Watts, 1977)
- Horrible (Press, 1982)
- Real Cool Time/What Can I Do/Monopoly EP (Overzealous Editions, 1989)
- Everybody Knows, Twang 1 EP (Seminal Twang, 1991)
- 4 Four Kids EP (Ralph, 1991)
- Postcard EP (Earl, 1991)
- Eye of the Hurricane/Said and Done/U.S. Teens are Spoiled Bums/Daytona Beach EP (1991)

=== Singles ===
- "No Direct Line from my Brain to My Heart"/"(I Don't Want to Have) Mono (No More)" 7" (50 Skidillion Watts, 1978)
- "Spy" (Armageddon, 1981)
- "How Will I Know" (Press, 1982)
- "U.S. Teens Are Spoiled Bums" (50 Skidillion Watts, 1988)
- "T For Texas"/"Go Go Go Go" (X.X.O.O. Fan Club, 1990)

=== Film/video ===
- Half Japanese: The Band That Would Be King (Jeff Feuerzeig, Washington Square Films, 1993)

=== Books ===
- All the Doctors in Hot Springs, December 2012
