= 50 Skidillion Watts =

Record label

50 Skidillion Watts, also known as "50,000,000,000,000,000,000,000,000,000,000 Watts Records", was the label used by brothers David and Jad Fair of the punk rock band Half Japanese to release their first albums recorded in the late 1970s.

After a deal with the British independent label Armageddon, the 50 Skidillion Watts label was not used again until the collapse of Half Japanese's Iridescent label sometime in the mid-1980s. The result of Iridescent's fall lead to 50 Skidillion Watts' revival with the help of Penn Jillette. Penn, a passionate Half Japanese fan, claims he used money from his appearance on Miami Vice to bring the label back in business, with the full name "50 Skidillion Watts of Power in the Hands of Babies Records".[3]

There is speculation that the label's short life span is due in part to a hostile distribution deal with Dutch East India Trading causing the Fair brothers to stop releasing and re-issuing albums under the label's name. Reissues of albums from 50 Skidillion Watts label have been released through Drag City and Jagjaguwar.

The number of zeros the label uses to represent a "skidillion" (as in skillion, one of the indefinite and fictitious numbers) varies on different releases.

== Inactive roster ==
- Half Japanese
- Maureen "Moe" Tucker
- Happy Family
- Bongos, Bass & Bob
- Coo Coo Rocking Time
- Jad Fair & Daniel Johnston
