= Jad Fair =

American singer and guitarist (born 1954)

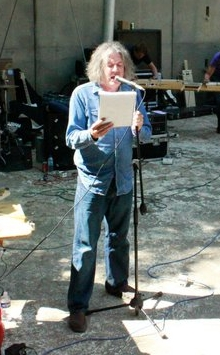
- Jad Fair at Villette Sonique 2011, Parc de la Villette, Paris

Background information
- Born: June 9, 1954 (age 72); Coldwater, Michigan, United States
- Genres: Indie rock, punk rock, experimental rock
- Instruments: Vocals, guitar, drums
- Years active: 1974–present
- Labels: 50 Skidillion Watts, Joyful Noise, Iridescence, Paperhouse, Alternative Tentacles, Thick Syrup, Fire
- Website: www.jadfair.org

Jadwin B. Fair (born June 9, 1954) is an American singer, guitarist, graphic artist, and founding member of lo-fi alternative rock group Half Japanese.

== Biography ==
Fair was born in Coldwater, Michigan. In 1974, he and his brother David formed the lo-fi group Half Japanese. Since then, Half Japanese has released nearly 30 records.

Besides Half Japanese, Fair performs and records as a solo artist, and collaborates with artists such as Terry Adams, Kramer, Norman Blake, Kevin Blechdom, Isobel Campbell, Eugene Chadbourne, DQE, Steve Fisk, Fred Frith, God Is My Co-Pilot, Richard Hell, Daniel Johnston, J. Mascis, Jason Willett, Monster Party, Weird Paul Petroskey, R. Stevie Moore, Thurston Moore, The Pastels, Phono-Comb, Steve Shelley, Strobe Talbot, Teenage Fanclub, The Tinklers, Moe Tucker, Bill Wells, Jason Willett, Adult Rodeo, Lumberob, Yo La Tengo, and John Zorn.

In 1982, Fair released his first solo work, the single "The Zombies of Mora-Tau" followed by the full-length album Everyone Knew ... But Me one year later.

Besides his musical career Fair is also active as a visual artist, drawings, as well as papercuttings. He took up papercutting to alleviate boredom while touring on the road. Many of the album covers are made by Fair. Four books of Fair's art have been published. Exhibitions of Fair's paper cuts and drawings have taken place in New York, Tokyo, Glasgow, Austin, Paris, London, Houston, The Hague at the State-X New Forms festival, and in Nantes at Le Lieu Unique together with Daniel Johnston.

It's Spooky is a 1989 collaboration album by Daniel Johnston and Jad Fair. Strange but True is a collaborative album between the band Yo La Tengo and Jad Fair. It was released by Matador Records in 1998. Song titles on the album were taken from outrageous newspaper headlines. In 2002, Fair recorded an album with R. Stevie Moore, titled FairMoore, described as "a lovely, heartfelt effort that shows both in top form" by Dave Mandl, who stated that it "brings together two fiercely original figures in the American music underground", the album consisting of Fair reciting his poetry over Moore's instrumental backing. Words Of Wisdom And Hope is a collaboration between Glasgow, Scotland's Teenage Fanclub, and Fair, released in 2002.

In 2008, experimental instrument builder Yuri Landman constructed for Fair a special two-string instrument called the Bachelor QS. In 2011, Half Japanese reunited as a live band and toured through Europe. In 2011, Thick Syrup Records released the compilation album '78 LTD. This album features the track "36 Perfect Ways I Ching of Love" Fair made with Ken Stringfellow (Posies, R.E.M.). In 2012, Fair contributed to the Landman album That's Right Go Cats with a 22-minute vocal contribution on side A of the record. The Nantes-based venue Le Lieu Unique organised a large exhibition of graphical work made by Fair and Daniel Johnston in April 2012. In the same month Fair released a lost album called Songs from a Haunted House with Gilles Reider on Interbang Records.

In 2012, Jad Fair released a collaboration with French experimentalist trio Hifiklub and German guitarist/producer kptmichigan on Joyful Noise Recordings. The band was originally assembled to provide the audio component to Jad Fair's art exhibition at Le Dojo – Nice in France, 2011.

== Discography ==
=== Solo ===
==== Albums ====
- Everyone Knew ... But Me (Press, 1981)
- Monarchs (Iridescence, 1984)
- Best Wishes (Iridescence, 1987)
- Great Expectations (Bad Alchemy, 1989)
- I Like It When You Smile (Paperhouse, 1992)
- Short Songs (Smells Like Records, 1993)
- Greater Expectations (Psycho Acoustic Sounds/TEC. Tones, 1995)
- Sunshiney Sunshine (download)
- His Name Itself Is Music (Fire, 2011)

==== Compilation albums ====
- Mr. Snail's Halloween Party (Snail Sounds, 2005)
- Beautiful Songs (The Best Of Jad Fair) (3 CDs) (Fire, 2011)

==== EPs ====
- The Zombies of Mora-Tau (Press, 1982)

==== Singles ====
- "Good Day" – (Arts & Crafts Series Vol. 1, 2004)
- "Three Cycles" (France, 2005)
- "Samantha" (Third Uncles Records, 2009)

=== With David Fair ===
- Jad and David Fair – Best Friends (UK Vesuvius, 1996)
- Jad and David Fair – 26 Monster Songs for Children (Kill Rock Stars, 1998)
- Jad and David Fair – Six Dozen Cookies (2006)
- David and Jad Fair – Halloween Songs (Thick Syrup Records, 2008)
- David and Jad Fair – I'll Be Moe (Thick Syrup Records, 2009)
- David and Jad Fair – Shake Cackle and Squall (Joyful Noise Recordings, 2016)

=== With Daniel Johnston ===
- Jad Fair and Daniel Johnston – It's Spooky (50 Skidillion Watts, 1989)
- The Lucky Sperms – Somewhat Humorous (Jagjaguwar, 2001)

=== With Kramer ===
==== Albums ====
- Jad Fair and Kramer – Roll Out the Barrel (1988, Shimmy-Disc)
- Jad Fair and Kramer – The Sound of Music (An Unfinished Symphony in 12 Parts) (1998, Shimmy-Disc)
- Jad Fair and Kramer – The History of Crying, Revisited (2021, Shimmy-Disc)

=== In Mosquito ===
- Mosquito – Oh No Not Another Mosquito My House Is Full of Them! (Psycho Acoustic Sounds, 1993)
- Mosquito – Time Was (ERL/Smells Like Records, 1993)
- Mosquito – UFO Catcher (Japan. Time Bomb, 1993)
- Mosquito – Cupid's Fist (Hol. Red Note, 1994)

=== With Nao ===
==== Albums ====
- Jad and Nao – Half Robot (Paperhouse, 1993)
- Jad and Nao – Half Alien (Sakura Wrechords Japan, 1997)
- Jad and Nao – Half Monster (Misc. Music, 2008)

=== With The Pastels ===
==== EPs ====
- Jad Fair and The Pastels – This Could Be the Night EP (Paperhouse, 1991)
- Jad Fair and The Pastels – No. 2 EP (Paperhouse, 1992)

=== With The Shapir-O Rama ===
- We Are the Rage – Jad Fair & The Shapir-O'Rama (1996)
- I Like Your Face – Jad Fair & Shapir-O'Rama (1999)

=== With Teenage Fanclub ===
==== Albums ====
- Teenage Fanclub and Jad Fair – Words Of Wisdom And Hope (Domino, 2002)

==== Singles ====
- Teenage Fanclub and Jad Fair – "Near To You" (Geographic, 2002)
- Teenage Fanclub and Jad Fair – "Always in My Heart" (Alternative Tentacles, 2002)
- Teenage Fanclub and Jad Fair – "Like a Monkey in a Zoo" (Pema, 2006)

=== With Jason Willett ===
==== Albums ====
- Jason Willett/Jad Fair/Gilles Rieder (Megaphone Limited) (1992)
- Jason Willett & Jad Fair – It's All Good (Megaphone Limited) (1995)
- Jad Fair & Jason Willett – Honeybee (Dr Jim's) (1996)
- Jad Fair & Jason Willett – The Mighty Super-Heroes (Marginal Talent) (1997)
- Jad Fair & Jason Willett – Wonderful World (Shrimper) triple cassette (1997)
- Jad Fair & Jason Willett – Twister (Dark Beloved Cloud) lp (1997)
- Jason Willett & Jad Fair – We're Going to the Moon (Megaphone Limited) cd (1998)
- Jad Fair & Jason Willett – Wild (Megaphone Limited) cd (1998)
- Jad Fair & Jason Willett – The Mighty Hypnotic Eye (Dr Jim's) cd (1999)
- Jad Fair & Jason Willett – Enjoyable songs (Alternative Tentacles) lp & cd (1999)
- Jad Fair & Jason Willett – The Attack of Everything paperback + cd (2002)
- Jad Fair & Jason Willett – Superfine (Public Eyesore) cd (2005)
- Jad Fair & Jason Willett – The Greatest Power (Dymaxion Groove) (2015)

==== Singles ====
- Jad Fair & Jason Willett – "Punk Rock" (Chlorophyl, 1996)
- Jad Fair & Jason Willett – "The Corpse is Missing" (Slab-O-Concrete, 1996)
- Jad Fair & Jason Willett – "Jackpot - Songs And Art" (Vesuvius/Slab-O-Concrete, 1997)

=== With Yo La Tengo ===
- 1998: Yo La Tengo – Strange but True (an album based on the unusual stories taken from the Strange but True column of newspapers)

=== With Phono-Comb ===
- In A Haunted House 7" (Derivative Records, 1995)
- Monsters, Lullabies...and the Occasional Flying Saucer CD (Shake the Record, 1996)

=== Other projects ===
- Between Meals – Oh No I Just Knocked Over a Cup of Coffee (Iridescence, 1983)
- Coo Coo Rocking Time – Coo Coo Party Time (50 Skidillion Watts, 1990)
- The Making of the Album, 1991, Seminal Twang – TWANG 02 CD Maxi Single w/ Daniel Johnston, Gilles Reider & Tom Recchion
- Workdogs in Hell – Workdogs in Hell (Sympathy for the Record Industry, 1993)
- Strobe Talbot – 20 Pop Songs (Alternative Tentacles, 2001)
- Jad Fair and R. Stevie Moore – FairMoore (Old Gold, 2002)
- Jad Fair & Bill Wells – Whale EP (Friends And Relatives Records, ?)
- Jad Fair And Daisy Cooper – South Pole (Lathe, 8", Ltd, Shape, Cle), People in a Position To Know, 2007
- Human Adult Band / Jad Fair – Samantha (7", Spl) 2009, Third Uncle Records
- Coo Coo Rocking Time – Seven Ways To Sunday (Thick Syrup Records Box Set, 2010)
- Coo Coo Rocking Time – Coo Coo Party Time – Remastered Louder (Thick Syrup Records, 2011)
- Yuri Landman Ensemble feat. Jad Fair & Philippe Petit – That's Right Go Cats, 2012, (CD Thick Syrup Records, LP Siluh Records)
- Monster Party: Jad Fair, Gilles-Vincent Rieder – Songs from A Haunted House CD/LP (Interbang Records, 2012)
- Whistling Joy Jumpers: Jad Fair, Thollem McDonas, & Brian Chase – Surprising Wooden Clocks (Thick Syrup Records, 2013)
- Jad Fair & Strobe Talbot, Let's Born to Rock, Joyful Noise Recordings, 2014
- Jad Fair & Danielson, Solid Gold Heart, Sounds Familyre, 2014
- Jad Fair & R. Stevie Moore, The Great American Songbook, Vol. 1, Joyful Noise Recordings, 2014
- Jad Fair, Tenniscoats, & Norman Blake, How Many Glasgow, Sweet Dreams Press, 2014
- Jad Fair & Norman Blake, Yes, Joyful Noise Recordings, 2015

=== Compilations ===
- Jad Fair / Tom Recchion / Ant Farm – Slowscan Vol. 4 (Cass, Comp, Ltd, C60), 1986 Slowscan
- I Said No Doctors! (2017, Dymaxion Groove)
