= Daniel Johnston discography =

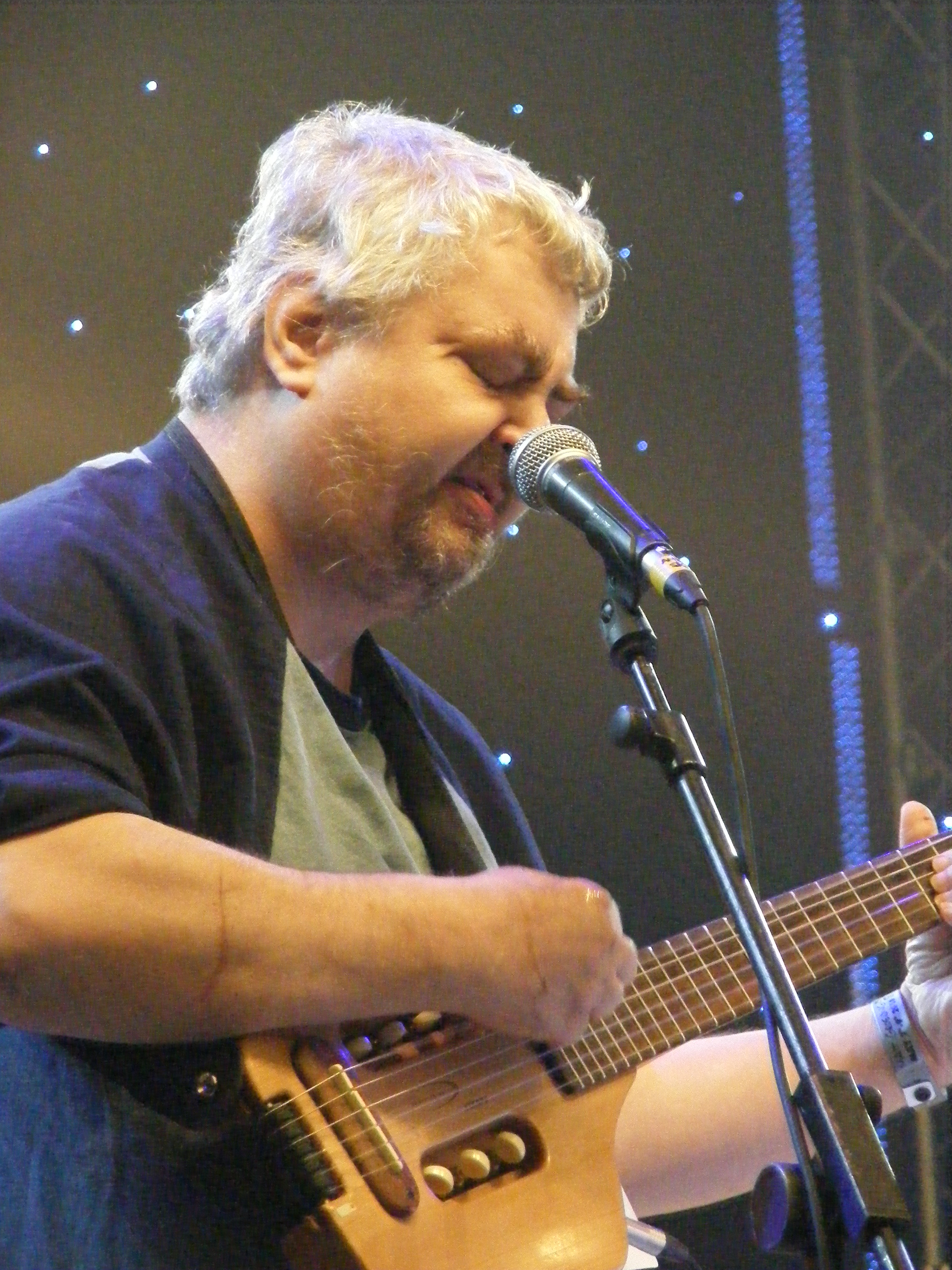
- Johnston in 2010
- Studio albums: 8
- Extended plays: 3
- Live albums: 5
- Compilation albums: 5
- Tribute albums: 7
- Home recorded: 11

This is a list of the discography of Daniel Johnston, who lived in Austin, Texas.

== Handmade cassettes ==
Before the production of Yip/Jump Music in 1983, Johnston did not make copies of his cassette albums, and so each copy would be an entirely unique recording. The standardised copies of these albums were released when Stress Records purchased Johnston's back catalog in 1986.

List of handmade cassettes, with selected details
Title	Album details	Notes
Songs of Pain	Released: 1981; Labels: Self-released (Standardized by Stress Records in 1988); Formats: Cassette, CD, LP, CD-R (See #Release history)	
Don't Be Scared	Released: July 1982; Labels: Self-released (Standardized by Stress Records in 1986); Formats: Cassette, CD-R, CD, LP (See #Release history)	
The What of Whom	Released: August 1982; Labels: Self-released (Standardized by Stress Records in 1987); Formats: Cassette, CD-R, CD, LP (See #Release history)	
Ugly Music	Released: August 1982; Label: Self-released; Formats: Cassette	Handmade alternate version of Songs of Pain
More Songs of Pain	Released: 1983; Labels: Self-released (Standardized by Stress Records in 1988); Formats: Cassette, CD, LP, CD-R (See #Release history)	
Someday You're Gonna Make It, Joe	Released: February 1983; Label: Self-released; Formats: Cassette	Lost alternate version of More Songs of Pain
Yip/Jump Music	Released: August 1983; Label: Stress; Formats: Cassette, CD, LP, CD-R (See #Release history)	
Hi, How Are You	Released: September 1983; Label: Stress; Formats: Cassette, CD, LP, CD-R (See #Release history)	
Retired Boxer	Released: December 1984; Label: Stress; Formats: Cassette, CD (See #Release history)	
Respect	Released: January 1985; Label: Stress; Formats: Cassette, 10" vinyl, CD-R, CD (See #Release history)	
Continued Story	Released: December 1985; Label: Stress; Formats: Cassette, LP, CD (See #Release history); Initially released as a cassette exclusive.	
Merry Christmas	Released: December 1988; Label: Stress; Formats: Cassette	

== Studio albums ==
List of studio albums, with selected details
Title	Album details
1990	Released: January 1990; Label: Shimmy-Disc
Artistic Vice	Released: 1991; Label: Shimmy-Disc; First Johnston album made entirely of studio recordings.
Fun	Released: September 20, 1994; Label: Atlantic
Rejected Unknown	Released: October 9, 2001; Label: Gammon
Fear Yourself	Released: 2003; Label: Gammon
Lost and Found	Released: April 2006; Label: Sketchbook
Is and Always Was	Released: October 6, 2009; Label: Eternal Yip Eye Music
Space Ducks	Released: 2012; Label: Eternal Yip Eye Music

== Live albums ==
List of live albums, with selected details
Title	Album details
Live at South by Southwest	Released: 1991; Label: Stress; Format: Cassette
Frankenstein Love	Released: 1998; Label: Stress; Format: Cassette
Why Me?	Released: 2000; Label: Trikont
Live@Albertstudios	Released: 2010; Label: Albert Music
Normal	Released: 2013; Label: Teen Arena
Chicago 2017	Released: 2020; Label: dBpm

== Extended plays ==
List of extended plays, with selected details
Title	Release details
Laurie	Released: 1992; Label: Seminal Twang
Happy Time	Released: 1994; Label: Seed; Format: 7" vinyl
Sinning Is Easy	Released: 2002; Label: Pickled Egg; Format: 7" vinyl

== Singles ==
List of singles, with selected details
Title	Release details
"Dream Scream"	Released: 1998; Label: Pickled Egg; Format: 7" vinyl
"Impossible Love"	Released: 2001
"Mountain Top"	Released: 2003; Label: Rough Trade; Format: 7"
"Fish"	Released: 2003; Label: Sketchbook; Format: 7"

== Side projects and collaborations ==
=== Danny and the Nightmares ===
Title	Release details
Danny and the Nightmares	Released: 1999; Label: Eternal Yip Eye
The End Is Near Again	Released: 2003; Label: Cool Beans
Freak Brain	Released: 2005; Label: Sympathy
The Death of Satan	Released: 2013; Label: Munster

=== Daniel Johnston and the Rhythm Rats ===
Title	Release details
Big Big World	Released: 1991; Label: Seminal Twang

=== Collaborations ===
==== Jad Fair ====
- It's Spooky (50 Skidillion Watts, 1989; reissued on Jagjaguwar, 2001)
- The Lucky Sperms: Somewhat Humorous (with Chris Bultman; Jagjaguwar, 2001)

==== Yo La Tengo ====
- Speeding Motorcycle single (1990)

==== Hyperjinx Tricycle ====
- Hyperjinx Tricycle (Important Records, 2000)
- "Long Lost Love" single (2002)
- Alien Mind Control 3" CD (Important Records, 2003)

==== Okkervil River ====
- "Happy Hearts" off the album Don't Fall in Love with Everyone You See (Jagjaguwar, 2002)

==== Rule of Thirds ====
- "Rin Tin Soldier" (Eternal Yip Eye Music, 2003)

==== Jack Medicine ====
- The Electric Ghosts (Important Records, 2006)

==== Mark Linkous ====
- Fear Yourself (Coppertree Records UK, Ltd Ed 180g vinyl, 2008)

==== Beam ====
- Beam Me Up! (Hazelwood, 2010)

=== Other appearances ===
- spoken word performance on the track "Love is a fascist invention" on the Alpine Those Myriads album "yr royal jetlag gospel" (Osito Records, 2003)
- with Kraig Mc Govern and on a live track recorded in Dublin July 2008
- with the Swell Season on January 31, 2009, Austin City Limits (previously recorded on September 28, 2008) to perform the song "Life in Vain"

== Compilations and tribute albums ==
- The Lost Recordings (Stress Records, recorded 1983, released 1992) cassette
- The Lost Recordings II (Stress Records, recorded 1983, released 1992) cassette
- A Texas Trip - contributed two songs (Caroline Records, 1987)
- Please Don't Feed The Ego (Eternal Yip Eye Music, 1994)
- Dead Dog's Eyeball: Songs of Daniel Johnston, by Kathy McCarty (1994)
- My So-Called Life - contributed "Come See Me Tonight" (1995)
- Schoolhouse Rock! Rocks - contributed "Unpack Your Adjectives" (1996)
- The Early Recordings of Daniel Johnston Volume 1 (Dualtone, 2003) - Reissue of Songs of Pain and More Songs of Pain
- The Sun Shines Down On Me by Gerry Nobody (2003)
- The Late Great Daniel Johnston: Discovered Covered (Gammon Records, 2004) - Tribute album along with disc of original versions plus one new song
- White Magic: From The Cassette Archives 1979–1989 (Eternal Yip Eye Music, 2004)
- I Killed the Monster: 21 Artists Performing the Songs of Daniel Johnston (2006) - Tribute album featuring contributions from Sufjan Stevens, Mike Watt, Jad Fair and Kimya Dawson
- Apskaft Tribute To Daniel Johnston (The Sound Of Apskaft, 2011)
- 50minutes (EXERCISE1 Recordings, 2006)
- Welcome To My World (Eternal Yip Eye Music, 2006)
- My Yoke Is Heavy: The Songs of Daniel Johnston by Adrian Crowley and James Yorkston (Chemikal Underground, 2013)
- Strange Boy, a remake of Retired Boxer by Kate Davis (Solitaire Recordings, 2021)

== Films ==
- The Devil and Daniel Johnston
- The Angel and Daniel Johnston - Live at the Union Chapel
- Daniel Johnston at Home LIVE recorded live in Waller Texas 1999 (Stephen Tompkins, Digital Download video/mp3 release 2009)
