= The Late Great Daniel Johnston: Discovered Covered =

Compilation album by Daniel Johnston/Various Artists
- Released: September 21, 2004
- Genre: Indie rock
- Length: 133:09
- Label: Gammon

Professional ratings
Review scores
Source	Rating
AllMusic	4/5 stars
Pitchfork	8.3/10

The Late Great Daniel Johnston: Discovered Covered is a 2004 Gammon Records two-disc set. The first disc features covers of Daniel Johnston songs by a variety of different artists. The second disc features the original versions of these eighteen songs, as well as "Rock This Town", a previously unreleased Johnston track. It was curated and produced by Mark Linkous of Sparklehorse. Despite what the title and cover art may suggest, Johnston lived to see the album's release; he died fifteen years later in 2019.

== Track listing ==
All tracks written by Daniel Johnston.

Disc 1:

No.	Title	Artist	Length
1.	"My Life is Starting Over Again"	Teenage Fanclub with Jad Fair	2:10
2.	"Don't Let the Sun Go Down on Your Grievances"	Clem Snide	4:08
3.	"Impossible Love"	Gordon Gano	4:49
4.	"Living Life"	Eels	2:48
5.	"Walking the Cow"	TV on the Radio	4:44
6.	"Good Morning You"	The Rabbit	3:00
7.	"Sorry Entertainer"	Calvin Johnson	3:01
8.	"Devil Town"	Bright Eyes with Nick Zinner	3:06
9.	"Dream Scream"	Death Cab for Cutie	6:58
10.	"True Love Will Find You in the End"	Beck	3:23
11.	"Go"	Sparklehorse with The Flaming Lips	4:31
12.	"Blue Clouds"	Mercury Rev	4:43
13.	"Love Not Dead"	Thistle LLC	3:26
14.	"Like a Monkey in a Zoo"	Vic Chesnutt	5:20
15.	"Dead Lover's Twisted Heart"	Starlight Mints	3:41
16.	"Story of an Artist"	M. Ward	4:20
17.	"The Sun Shines Down on Me"	Guster	3:06
18.	"King Kong"	Tom Waits	5:31
Total length:			72:45

Disc 2:

All tracks on this disc performed by Daniel Johnston.

No.	Title	Album	Length
1.	"My Life is Starting Over Again"	Artistic Vice	2:05
2.	"Don't Let the Sun Go Down on Your Grievances"	Yip/Jump Music	3:18
3.	"Impossible Love"	Rejected Unknown	2:55
4.	"Living Life"	Songs of Pain	3:25
5.	"Walking the Cow"	Hi, How Are You	3:34
6.	"Good Morning You"	Respect	1:12
7.	"Sorry Entertainer"	Yip/Jump Music	2:17
8.	"Devil Town"	1990	1:02
9.	"Dream Scream"	Rejected Unknown	4:49
10.	"True Love Will Find You in the End"	Retired Boxer	1:45
11.	"Go"	Respect	3:47
12.	"Blue Clouds"	The What of Whom	3:21
13.	"Love Not Dead"	Fear Yourself	4:07
14.	"Like a Monkey in a Zoo"	Songs of Pain	2:40
15.	"Dead Lover's Twisted Heart"	Yip/Jump Music	1:13
16.	"Story of an Artist"	Don't Be Scared	4:56
17.	"The Sun Shines Down on Me"	Don't Be Scared	2:00
18.	"King Kong"	Yip/Jump Music	5:42
19.	"Rock This Town"	Previously unreleased	6:16
Total length:			60:24
