= Respect (Daniel Johnston album) =

1985 album by Daniel Johnston

Studio album by Daniel Johnston
- Released: 1985
- Recorded: January 1985
- Length: 30:28
- Label: Stress Records

Daniel Johnston chronology
Retired Boxer (1984)	Respect (1985)	Continued Story with Texas Instruments (1985)

Respect is the 8th self-released music cassette album by singer-songwriter Daniel Johnston, released in 1985. It features covers of the Elvis Presley song "Heartbreak Hotel" and the Bert Berns song "A Little Bit of Soap", made popular by The Jarmels.

== Background ==
Since it was recorded only one month following his last album, the context surrounding Respect is essentially the same as that of Johnston's album Retired Boxer. Johnston recorded both albums whilst living in an apartment leased to him by a local church in Austin, Texas. During recording, Johnston steadily amassed a local following as he gifted copies of his albums to anyone who would take them. Johnston also began playing acoustic guitar during this time, inspired by the Austin-based guitarists.

In the documentary The Devil and Daniel Johnston, tapes dated January 3 – 5 1985 are shown during playback of Johnston describing symptoms of bipolar disorder, suggesting that Johnston had been recently diagnosed at that time, although the lyrics to "Keep Punching Joe" from Hi, How Are You make direct reference to the disorder.

The album also features Johnston turning to a shorter song-writing format; while most songs on "Retired Boxer" had been over three minutes, Respect is primarily made up of shorter tracks averaging around one or two minutes. It also features two covers, a Bert Berns song "A Little Bit Of Soap" and "Heartbreak Hotel", by Elvis Presley, both of which influenced the album's sound.

== Promotion ==
In 1985, Johnston began to perform live in concert, firstly opening for the local band Glass Eye. After this he continued to perform sporadic 2 - 3 song sets in local clubs, including a June 29, performance at Woodshock 85, as well as a televised single song performance on the MTV program The Cutting Edge filmed on August 24.

== Legacy ==
In 2004, two songs from Respect were included on the official tribute album The Late Great Daniel Johnston - "Good Morning You" by The Rabbit, and "Go" by Sparklehorse with The Flaming Lips. In 2020, Built To Spill, who had performed as Johnston's backing band in 2017, included "Good Morning You" on their album Built to Spill Plays the Songs of Daniel Johnston.

== Track listing ==
All tracks are written by Daniel Johnston, except where noted. All tracks produced by Johnston.

Side one
No.	Title	Writer(s)	Length
1.	"No Love in Town"		1:00
2.	"An Angel Cry"		2:11
3.	"Have Respect"		2:46
4.	"Dream"		1:05
5.	"I Know What I Want"		2:09
6.	"Merry-Go-Round"		1:58
7.	"A Little Bit of Soap" (The Jarmels cover)	Bert Berns	2:26
8.	"Loneliness"		1:41
Total length:			15:16

Side two
No.	Title	Writer(s)	Length
9.	"Good Morning You"		1:13
10.	"Go"		4:22
11.	"Fast Go"		1:25
12.	"Car Crash"		0:24
13.	"Just Like a Widow"		1:46
14.	"Heartbreak Hotel" (Elvis Presley cover)	Mae Boren Axton, Tommy Durden, Elvis Presley	2:15
15.	"You Killed My Baby"		1:50
16.	"You Are a Writer"		0:26
17.	"Go Some More"		0:14
18.	"Theme from Respect"		1:17
Total length:			15:12

=== 1993 Abridged Vinyl 'Mini-Album' Version ===
The 10" mini-album version released only in Spain in 1993 cuts the minute-long tape experiment 'Fast Go.' This retraction reduces the already short album to 29:15.

All tracks are written by Daniel Johnston, except where noted. All tracks produced by Johnston.

Side one
No.	Title	Writer(s)	Length
1.	"No Love in Town"		1:00
2.	"An Angel Cry"		2:11
3.	"Have Respect"		2:46
4.	"Dream"		1:05
5.	"I Know What I Want"		2:09
6.	"Merry-Go-Round"		1:58
7.	"A Little Bit of Soap" (The Jarmels cover)	Bert Berns	2:26
8.	"Loneliness"		1:41
Total length:			15:16

Side two
No.	Title	Writer(s)	Length
9.	"Good Morning You"		1:13
10.	"Go"		4:22
11.	"Car Crash"		0:24
12.	"Just Like a Widow"		1:46
13.	"Heartbreak Hotel" (Elvis Presley cover)	Mae Boren Axton, Tommy Durden, Elvis Presley	2:15
14.	"You Killed My Baby"		1:50
15.	"You Are a Writer"		0:26
16.	"Go Some More"		0:14
17.	"Theme from Respect"		1:17
Total length:			13:54

== Release history ==
Year	Label	Format	Region	Notes
1985	Self-Released	Cassette	USA	
1993	Ay Carramba! Rekkids	10" vinyl	Spain	Abridged Mini-Album version.
2005	Eternal Yip Eye Music	CD-R	USA	Bonus tracks on 'Retired Boxer' CD
2006	Eternal Yip Eye Music	CD	USA	Bonus tracks on 'Retired Boxer' CD
2014	Eternal Yip Eye Music	Cassette	USA	
