= More Songs of Pain =

1983 album by Daniel Johnston

Studio album by Daniel Johnston
- Released: 1983
- Recorded: 1982–1983
- Length: 46:25
- Labels: Self-released; Stress Records; Dual Tone
- Producer: Daniel Johnston

Daniel Johnston chronology
The What of Whom (1982)	More Songs of Pain (1983)	Yip/Jump Music (1983)

More Songs of Pain is the fourth self-released music cassette album by singer-songwriter Daniel Johnston, recorded late 1982 and early 1983. The album was re-released on cassette in 1988 by Stress records, made available in downloadable mp3 format by Emusic in 2000. In 2003, it was released on CD by Dual Tone, as the second half of the compilation Early Recordings Volume 1.

== Background ==
More Songs of Pain was Daniel Johnston's final album recorded in his parents' basement in West Virginia. During the sessions, Johnston was 21-22 and would have been studying for his Senior year at Kent State University in East Liverpool, Ohio, if he had not been taken out of education by his parents out of fear of him failing to graduate. The album is placed between The What of Whom (August 1982) and Yip/Jump Music (April 1983).

The album introduces the recurring character of Joe, a stand-in for Johnston, 'an average guy trying to defeat his demons.' Joe would feature heavily in the lyrics to Hi, How Are You, and would appear on the cover of Retired Boxer.

As well as having an improved sound quality than 'Songs of Pain', 'More' also showcases Johnston becoming less self referential in his lyrics, with only 'More Dead Than Alive' referring back to 'Monkey in a Zoo'.

== Legacy ==
In 2003, Jason MacNeil writing for PopMatters described Songs of Pain and More Songs of Pain as "Overall easy on the ears," but said that Johnston's "whiney vocals" could be "challenging at times". He also compared the album to later acts such as They Might Be Giants and Ben Folds.

MacNeil also considers "You Put My Love out the Door" as a highlight of the album, calling it "a melodic and somber mid-tempo tune where Johnston pours his heart out yet again about an old flame", but criticized "Never Get To Heaven" as "ragged and average". In 2006, Kimya Dawson covered "Follow That Dream" for the Daniel Johnston tribute album I Killed The Monster. In 2010, Douglas Wolk writing for Pitchfork described More Songs of Pain as "a accomplished if less bracing take on a lot of the same themes [...as Songs of Pain]".

When Billboard published their "12 essential Daniel Johnston tracks" list in 2019, "Phantom of My Own Opera" was included. NBC News described More Songs of Pain and Johnston's other 1983 albums as having "oblique, yet touching lyrics", as well as "oddly contagious melodies".

== Track listing ==
=== Original Cassette ===
All tracks are written by Daniel Johnston, except where noted. All tracks produced by Johnston.

Side one
No.	Title	Writer(s)	Length
1.	"Phantom of My Own Opera"		3:27
2.	"Man at War"		2:06
3.	"Only Missing You"		1:57
4.	"More Dead Than Alive"		6:34
5.	"I Will" (The Beatles cover)	Lennon-McCartney	1:23
6.	"Poptunes"		2:00
7.	"You Put My Love out the Door"		1:51
8.	"You're Gonna Make It Joe"		3:16
Total length:			22:34

Side two
No.	Title	Writer(s)	Length
9.	"Never Get to Heaven" (Dionne Warwick Cover)	Burt Bacharach, Hal David	2:38
10.	"Follow That Dream"		2:42
11.	"POW"		1:46
12.	"For the Love of Pete"		1:19
13.	"Blue Cloud"		3:45
14.	"Grievances Revisited"		2:22
15.	"True Grief"		3:57
16.	"My Baby Cares for the Dead"		2:01
17.	"Mabel's Grievances"		3:10
Total length:			23:40

=== 2010 The Story Of An Artist box-set ===
All tracks are written by Daniel Johnston, except where noted. All tracks produced by Johnston.

No.	Title	Writer(s)	Length
1.	"Phantom of My Own Opera"
2.	"Man at War"
3.	"Only Missing You"
4.	"More Dead Than Alive"
5.	"I Will" (The Beatles cover)	Lennon-McCartney
6.	"Poptunes"
7.	"You Put My Love out the Door"
8.	"You're Gonna Make It Joe"
9.	"Theme For Grievances"
10.	"Never Get to Heaven" (Dionne Warwick Cover)	Burt Bacharach, Hal David
11.	"Follow That Dream"
12.	"POW"
13.	"For the Love of Pete"
14.	"Blue Cloud"
15.	"Grievances Revisited"
16.	"True Grief"
17.	"My Baby Cares for the Dead"
18.	"Mabel's Grievances"

=== 2019 CD Re-issue ===
All tracks are written by Daniel Johnston, except where noted. All tracks produced by Johnston.

No.	Title	Writer(s)	Length
1.	"Phantom of My Own Opera"
2.	"Man at War"
3.	"Only Missing You"
4.	"More Dead Than Alive"
5.	"I Will" (The Beatles cover)	Lennon-McCartney
6.	"Poptunes"
7.	"You Put My Love out the Door"
8.	"You're Gonna Make It Joe"
9.	"If I Had My Own Way"
10.	"Grievances Again"
11.	"Never Get to Heaven" (Dionne Warwick Cover)	Burt Bacharach, Hal David
12.	"Follow That Dream"
13.	"POW"
14.	"For the Love of Pete"
15.	"Blue Cloud"
16.	"Grievances Revisited"
17.	"True Grief"
18.	"My Baby Cares for the Dead"
19.	"Mabel's Grievances"

== Release history ==
Year	Label	Format	Region	Notes
1988	Stress Records	Cassette	USA	
2003	Dualtone	CD	USA	As part of 'The Early Recordings', a 2xCD box-set also containing the original 'Songs of Pain'.
2010	Munster Records	LP / CD	Spain	As part of 'The Story Of An Artist', a 6 disc box-set containing Johnston's albums recorded in West Virginia between 1980 - 1983.
2014	Eternal Yip Eye Music	Cassette	USA	
2019	Eternal Yip Eye Music	CD-R	USA	

== The Lost Recordings ==
The Lost Recordings

Demo album by Daniel Johnston
- Recorded: 1983
- Label: Stress Records
- Producer: Daniel Johnston

Recorded concurrently with More Songs Of Pain, The Lost Recordings is a two-volume set of albums containing previously unreleased material from 1983. The tapes were re-discovered by Johnston in 1990, when they were found underneath his bed. Both volumes of The Lost Recordings contain "unfinished sketches" and "half-hearted demos".

Additionally, both album covers are dated 1983; yet, Johnston's official digital download website dates it as 1981–1983, whilst his physical media store dates it as 1979–1983. Love Defined would later be re-recorded for 'Yip/Jump Music', and 'Happy Talk' would receive a studio recording on 'It's Spooky.' The album also features a shorter version of 'Blue Cloud' from the More Songs of Pain album.

=== Track listing ===
==== Volume One ====
All tracks are written by Daniel Johnston except where noted.

Side one
No.	Title	Length
1.	"Take A Little Walk"	0:54
2.	"Before It's Too Late"	2:29
3.	"Oh What A Wonderful Feeling"	2:46
4.	"I'd Like To Say Goodbye"	2:05
5.	"That's Silly"	0:54
6.	"There Ain't Much You Can Do"	0:43
7.	"I'm A Song"	1:27
8.	"You Should Have Been My Wife"	2:44
9.	"You Ruined It For Yourself"	2:09
10.	"Once Upon A Dream"	1:27
11.	"I Love You"	3:45
12.	"Scattered Like Birds"	2:17
13.	"More About Wicked Will"	1:20
14.	"Good Luck"	0:41
15.	"Got To Go On"	4:09
Total length:		30:01

Side two
No.	Title	Length
16.	"It's Real"	4:09
17.	"If You Were Here Today"	0:16
18.	"Girlfriend"	2:54
19.	"Void (Space For The Memories)"	0:32
20.	"Sad And Lonely"	1:14
21.	"I'm Nervous"	1:46
22.	"Cosmic Kid"	1:27
23.	"Never Die"	2:42
24.	"Kiss Me Again"	3:30
25.	"I Wish I Could Call You"	3:48
26.	"Love Is Weird"	1:45
27.	"Burn Baby Burn"	2:17
28.	"No Fun"	2:29
29.	"Art Peace"	1:29
30.	"Instrumental"	1:26
Total length:		33:20

==== Volume Two ====
Side one
No.	Title	Writer(s)	Length
1.	"All Around The World"		1:36
2.	"You're Not Laura (After You're Gone)"		3:04
3.	"I'm Gonna Buy Me A Car"		1:45
4.	"Out West"		2:17
5.	"The Undertaker's Assistant"		1:35
6.	"Dream's Come True"		1:55
7.	"Mean To Me"		1:22
8.	"Fly Me To The Moon"		3:37
9.	"Love Defined"		4:12
10.	"How I Love That Organ Music"		3:42
11.	"We Could Be Together Again"		1:00
12.	"Happy Talk"	Oscar Hammerstein & Richard Rodgers	4:30
13.	"The Miracle Of Love"		1:11
Total length:			31:53

Side two
No.	Title	Writer(s)	Length
14.	"Who Killed The Monkey"		0:53
15.	"The Wedding"		3:20
16.	"Unfinished Symphony"		2:29
17.	"Blue Cloud"		3:15
18.	"I Never Meant To Be Spooky"		0:16
19.	"Dream Lover"	Bobby Darin	2:14
20.	"What's A Matter With Me"		1:43
21.	"If I Kissed You Once"		1:31
22.	"I Give Up"		2:53
23.	"Lonely Orphan On The Run"		2:00
24.	"The Goat Show"		7:03
25.	"You've Got A Funny Sense Of Humor"		2:30
26.	"Last Song For You"		0:58
Total length:			31:10
