= Don't Be Scared =

Studio album by Daniel Johnston
- Released: 1982
- Recorded: July 1982
- Studios: The Johnston Residence's Basement, West Virginia
- Genres: Blues, Outsider, Lo-fi
- Length: 60:37
- Labels: Self-released; Stress Records; Eternal Yip Eye Music
- Producer: Daniel Johnston

Daniel Johnston chronology
Songs of Pain (1981)	Don't Be Scared (1982)	The What of Whom (1982)

Professional ratings
Review scores
Source	Rating
AllMusic	2/5 stars
The Encyclopedia of Popular Music	3/5 stars
MusicHound Rock: The Essential Album Guide	2.5/5 stars
Spin Alternative Record Guide	5/10

Don't Be Scared is singer-songwriter Daniel Johnston's second self-released album, released in 1982. It was re-released on cassette in 1989 by Stress Records, a label run by Johnston's friend and manager Jeff Tartakov, on mp3 by emusic.com in 2000, and on CDR by Eternal Yip Eye Music in 2004.

"I Had Lost My Mind" features prominently in the 2005 documentary feature on Johnston's life, The Devil and Daniel Johnston. The song was accompanied in the film by animation created from cels drawn by Johnston in a book that he had intended to submit to a local competition.

== Background ==
The album was recorded in July 1982, during Johnston's summer vacation between his sophomore and junior years studying at Kent State University. He was 21 at the time.

As with the previous album, Songs of Pain, the recordings were made in his parents' basement in West Virginia, where Johnston was living at the time. Initially, Johnston only produced one copy of this tape, until 1986 when Jeff Tartakov of Stress Records began distributing copies.

=== Artwork ===
The artwork is a drawing of Johnston's 'Polka Dot Underwear Guy' character, with the top of his head removed. The exposed insides of his head represent Johnston's inability to hold anything back artistically, 'spilling forth embarrassingly personal expressions of vulnerability.' The character was when Johnston was in high school, representing anybody 'embattled by life', including Johnston. An evolution of the Polka Dot Underwear Guy, Joe The Boxer, later appeared on the cover of Retired Boxer.

== Legacy ==
On Kathy McCarty's 1994 tribute album Dead Dog's Eyeball, she featured two songs on Don't Be Scared, "I Had A Dream" and "Going Down". Sparklehorse recorded "My Yoke Is Heavy" for their 2000 EP Distorted Ghost. In 2004, M. Ward covered "Story of an Artist" and Guster "The Sun Shines Down on Me" on The Late Great Daniel Johnston. Two years later, Chris Harford covered the song "Going Down" on another tribute album titled I Killed The Monster. In 2013, Adrian Crowley and James Yorkston recorded a mini-album of Johnston covers titled after and featuring the song "My Yoke Is Heavy" as well as "The Sun Shines Down on Me".

Retrospectives on the album published decades following its release praised "The Story of an Artist" highly; the Tampa Bay Times called it "heartbreaking", while The New Yorker referred to it as "haunting".

In 2017, a benefit concert by the Canadian Mental Health foundation was held in tribute to Daniel Johnston and was named after the album.

When Douglas Wolk of Pitchfork reviewed Johnston's first six albums as part of the "Story of an Artist" boxset, "Don't Be Scared" was described as "lacking in quality control", with Wolk calling "Stars on Parade" "plain awful" and the rest of the material "rather samey", save for "The Story of An Artist". Similarly, Trouser Press called the album a "disjointed, a muddy transliteration of some fine songs."

In March 2019, No-Comply Skateshop released a limited edition series of Vans shoes featuring Johnston's artwork, including that of "Don't Be Scared".

David Peisner, writing for The New York Times, included the song "The Story of An Artist" in his "12 essential Daniel Johnston tracks" article. Similarly, Willoughby Thom for The Observer had "The Sun Shines Down on Me" in their top five. For The Miscellany News's retrospective on Johnston, Abby Tarwater described this album (as well as Songs of Pain) as 'strikingly lo-fi and achingly honest, balancing sunny, childlike pop songs with unfiltered musings on love and longing so agonizing that they're often uncomfortable to listen to'. In 2021, the American mystery-comedy television show Only Murders in the Building included the album's title track in its first episode. In May 2022, Vans produced a second shoe design featuring the album's artwork in a collage with his other tapes. In May 2023, an exhibit of Johnston's work hosted in Houston's Redbud Gallery was named after the album.

== Track listing ==
All tracks are written by Daniel Johnston.

Side one
No.	Title	Length
1.	"Going Down"	2:57
2.	"Lost Without a Dame"	2:58
3.	"Harley Man"	2:03
4.	"Something More"	3:23
5.	"Evening Stars"	2:04
6.	"Cold Hard World"	3:10
7.	"I Had a Dream"	2:40
8.	"The Story of an Artist"	5:08
9.	"My Yoke Is Heavy"	5:53
Total length:		30:16

Side two
No.	Title	Length
10.	"Stars on Parade"	2:42
11.	"And You Love It"	4:01
12.	"I Had Lost My Mind"	1:46
13.	"The Sun Shines Down on Me"	2:50
14.	"Loner"	4:09
15.	"Don't Be Scared"	3:20
16.	"Lullaby"	3:12
17.	"I Was Alone"	4:44
18.	"Mother Mom Said"	3:37
Total length:		30:21

== Release history ==
Year	Label	Format	Region	Notes
1986	Stress Records	Cassette	USA	
1989	Stress Records	Cassette	USA	
2004	Eternal Yip Eye Music	CD-R	USA	
2010	Eternal Yip Eye Music	Cassette	USA	
2010	Munster Records	CD	Spain	As part of 'The Story Of An Artist', a 6 disc box-set containing Johnston's albums recorded in West Virginia between 1980 - 1983.
2010	Munster Records	LP	Spain	As part of 'The Story Of An Artist', a 6 disc box-set containing Johnston's albums recorded in West Virginia between 1980 - 1983.
2014	Eternal Yip Eye Music	Cassette	USA	

== Personnel ==
- Daniel Johnston – vocals, piano
