= The What of Whom =

1982 album by Daniel Johnston

Studio album by Daniel Johnston
- Released: 1982
- Recorded: August 1982
- Genres: Alternative rock; lo-fi; outsider music
- Length: 59:43
- Labels: Self-released; Stress Records (1987 release)
- Producer: Daniel Johnston

Daniel Johnston chronology
Don't Be Scared (1982)	The What of Whom (1982)	More Songs of Pain (1983)

Professional ratings
Review scores
Source	Rating
Allmusic	2/5 stars

The What of Whom is the third self-released music cassette album by singer-songwriter Daniel Johnston, recorded in 1982.

The album was released on cassette in 1988 by Stress Records, made available in downloadable mp3 format by Emusic in 2000, and re-released on CD-R by Eternal Yip Eye Music in 2004. In between some songs, Daniel has little snippets of himself talking, or small skits of background noise concerning his everyday life.

== Background ==
The album was recorded in August 1982 between Johnston's Junior and Senior years studying at Kent State University, East Liverpool, Ohio. The album, like Songs of Pain and Don't Be Scared before it, was recorded in his parents' basement in West Virginia, where the 21 year old Johnston was living at the time. A guest writer for Atwood Magazine noted influences from Elvis Costello and The Beatles (particularly early John Lennon) on the track 'Man Obsessed.' During this same time, Johnston recorded an unreleased tape known as 'Ugly Music' for his friend John Fair. The tape was largely made up of material written for Songs of Pain, but also included Don't Be Scared and What of Whom songs, as well as 3 unreleased songs.

=== Artwork ===
The cover artwork is a drawing by Johnston of a woman's torso, inspired by Venus de Milo and Venus of Willendorf. The torso represents sex and the objectified, mystified, and dehumanized way women are portrayed in his lyrics and artwork.

== Legacy ==
In 2010, when Douglas Wolk reviewed the album for Pitchfork as part of the 'Story of an Artist' box-set, he described both it and Don't Be Scared as 'lacking in quality control.'

In the months following Johnston's death, several retrospectives on his career were published. New York Times' '12 essential Daniel Johnston tracks' article written by David Peisner features the first two tracks from The What Of Whom . Atwood Magazine's retrospective called Man Obsessed 'A darkly comedic inversion of 60s beat era pop'. When reviewing the album. Alison Alber (writing for Mxdwn) mentioned the song as an example of Johnston's lyrical talent.

A 2023 exhibit of collage artwork by Daniel and his sister Marjory Johnston at the Street Gallery in Austin was titled after the album.

=== Covers ===
Several notable musical acts have covered material from the album, "To Go Home" has been covered by Groovie Ghoulies, M. Ward (on his Post-War album) and The Copyrights. "Blue Clouds" has been covered by Mercury Rev (for The Late Great Daniel Johnston tribute album) and Adam Stafford. "Man Obsessed" has been covered by "Weird Paul" Petroskey, and Built to Spill covered "Heart Mind and Soul" for their Daniel Johnston tribute album.

== Track listing ==
All tracks are written by Daniel Johnston. All tracks produced by Johnston.

Side one
No.	Title	Length
1.	"Man Obsessed"	1:28
2.	"Peek A Boo"	4:50
3.	"Never Before, Never Again"	1:48
4.	"The Goldfish & The Frog"	2:20
5.	"Scuttle-Butt"	2:10
6.	"Heart, Mind and Soul"	5:22
7.	"Blue Clouds"	5:34
8.	"Surely You Don't Work All Night"	4:11
9.	"I Can't Think Anymore"	2:21
Total length:		30:04

Side two
No.	Title	Length
10.	"Excuse Me"	0:17
11.	"Polka Dot Rag"	5:28
12.	"Why, Without You"	3:23
13.	"An Incoherent Speech"	1:02
14.	"Wicked World"	4:16
15.	"To Go Home"	4:30
16.	"Scrambled Eggs"	5:02
17.	"Peace & Tranquility"	2:47
18.	"When You're Pretty"	2:54
Total length:		29:39

== Release history ==
Year	Label	Format	Region	Notes
1982	Self Released	Cassette	USA	
1987	Stress Records	Cassette	USA	
2004	Eternal Yip Eye Music	CD-R	USA	
2010	Munster Records	CD	Spain	As part of 'The Story Of An Artist', a 6 disc box-set containing Johnston's albums recorded in West Virginia between 1980 - 1983.
2010	Munster Records	LP	Spain	As part of 'The Story Of An Artist', a 6 disc box-set containing Johnston's albums recorded in West Virginia between 1980 - 1983.
2012	Eternal Yip Eye Music	Cassette	USA	
