= 1990 Daniel Johnston plane crash =

1990 aircraft incident in Arkansas, U.S.

Accident
- Date: March 17, 1990
- Summary: Forced landing following ignition shutdown by passenger during psychotic episode
- Site: Wooded area near Fordyce, Arkansas, United States

Aircraft
- Aircraft type: Beech A23 Musketeer
- Registration: N3520R
- Flight origin: Abilene, Texas, United States
- Destination: Holly Springs, North Carolina, United States
- Occupants: 2
- Passengers: 1
- Crew: 1
- Fatalities: 0
- Injuries: 2
- Survivors: 2

On March 17, 1990, American musician Daniel Johnston, while experiencing a psychotic episode, caused a two-seater private aircraft owned by his father, Bill Johnston—a former World War II pilot—to crash near Little Rock, Arkansas, United States. Daniel was being flown home from Austin, Texas, following performances at the Austin Music Awards and the South by Southwest festival.

Mid-flight, Daniel removed the plane's ignition key and threw it out the window. The aircraft entered a tailspin, and the two men struggled for the controls until Bill was able to level out the plane's path and crash-land in a wooded area. The plane was destroyed, but Bill and Daniel survived with minor injuries.

Daniel suffered from schizophrenia and bipolar disorder, and had, unbeknownst to his father, stopped taking his prescribed medication. Following the crash, he was involuntarily committed to a psychiatric hospital in West Virginia, and his father took charge of his medication. The crash is recounted in the 2005 documentary The Devil and Daniel Johnston, directed by Jeff Feuerzeig.

== Background ==
Daniel Johnston was an American musician and visual artist who grew up in New Cumberland, West Virginia, and began self-releasing homemade cassette tape albums while living with his family. After relocating to Austin, Texas, in the early 1980s, Johnston gained popularity in Austin's underground music scene and earned national attention following a 1985 appearance on the MTV program The Cutting Edge; however, he began exhibiting symptoms of mental illness, and was eventually diagnosed with schizophrenia and bipolar disorder.

Throughout the late 1980s, Johnston was repeatedly committed to psychiatric hospitals following psychotic episodes. This included attacking and hospitalizing his then-manager Randy Kemper with a lead pipe, believing Kemper was possessed by the devil; being found by police singing hymns in a creek near the University of Texas at Austin after taking LSD, leading to his commitment at the Austin State Hospital; and forcing his way into an elderly woman's apartment to perform an exorcism, causing her to jump from a second-story window and break several bones, prompting Johnston's court-ordered commitment.

Bill Johnston, Daniel's father and a former World War II pilot, had previously flown his son back from Austin to West Virginia after Daniel's release from Austin State Hospital. Daniel returned to Austin in March 1990 to perform at the Austin Music Awards and the South by Southwest festival, with Bill flying him there in his plane. Unbeknownst to Bill, Daniel had once again stopped taking the medication prescribed for his bipolar disorder, having previously done so during an April 1988 trip to New York City.

== Crash ==
Following Daniel's performances in Austin, he and Bill departed in the two-seater plane, a Beech A23 Musketeer with registration N3520R, for their return to West Virginia. South of Little Rock, Arkansas, at an altitude of approximately 6,500 feet, Daniel told his father he was going to be sick and reached over to turn off the engine; Bill turned the key back on. Daniel then threw a soda can out the window and demanded that Bill land on a nearby lake, with Bill responding that the plane could not land on water. Daniel, who had been reading a comic depicting Casper the Friendly Ghost and Spooky in parachutes, believed he himself was Casper, and yelled "Let's bail out!" before turning off the ignition a second time and throwing the keys out the window.

With the engine now dead, Daniel grabbed the controls, as he and Bill wrestled for them while the plane entered a tailspin. Bill called out, "You'll kill us!" and Daniel replied, "I can't die!" At the last moment, Daniel released the controls, allowing Bill to level out above the trees and aim for a clearing. The aircraft came up about 100 yards short, crashing into the treetops, where it lodged roughly 60 feet above the ground before falling straight down. Both men survived with only minor injuries.

The aircraft was destroyed in the crash. After they climbed out of the wreckage, a farmer ran up to help them; Daniel threatened him, prompting Bill to say, "Leave him alone. He's out of his mind." Walking out of the forest, the pair passed a rural church whose billboard read, "God promises a safe landing, but not a calm voyage." Convinced that he had saved his father from Satan, Daniel took their survival as proof that God was winning a battle with Satan over his soul.

== Aftermath and legacy ==
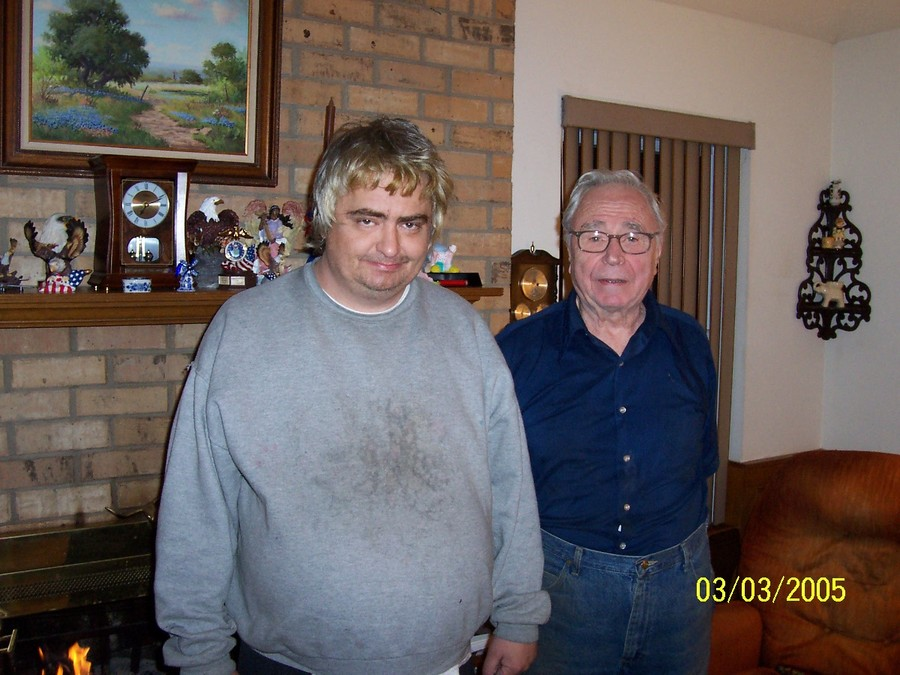
Daniel Johnston with his father Bill, the pilot of the aircraft, in 2005

Following the crash, Johnston was involuntarily committed to a psychiatric hospital in West Virginia. Bill, having discovered that Daniel had stopped taking his medication, took charge of it himself. Daniel's mother, Mabel, recalled that Bill at first resolved they would no longer have Daniel live with them, but later arranged to bring his son home; in 1991 the family moved to Waller, Texas, where Daniel lived when he was not hospitalized.

Director Jeff Feuerzeig had been drawn to Daniel after the musician performed a one-hour radio special by telephone around the time of his 1990 hospitalization; Feuerzeig was among those who called in, and he resolved to make a documentary about Daniel afterwards. He later featured the crash as director of the 2005 documentary The Devil and Daniel Johnston, in which Bill recounts the events of the crash.
