= Frankenstein Love =

Live album by Daniel Johnston
- Released: 1998
- Recorded: 1992
- Length: 56:39
- Label: Stress Records

Daniel Johnston chronology
Fun (1994)	Frankenstein Love (1998)	Why me? (2000)

Frankenstein Love is a live album recorded in 1992 at the Houston Room by Daniel Johnston. It was also released in digital format through eMusic in 2000.

== Track listing ==
All tracks are written by Daniel Johnston.

Side one
No.	Title	Length
1.	"Mind Contorted"	2:40
2.	"Life In Vain"	3:49
3.	"A Lonely Song"	1:47
4.	"Love Will See You Through"	2:28
5.	"Happy Time"	2:40
6.	"Come To Me Tonight"	1:53
7.	"Love Wheel"	2:40
8.	"Running Water"	2:55
9.	"Casper The Friendly Ghost"	1:47
10.	"Casper The Holy Ghost"	2:45
11.	"Frankenstein Love"	1:45
Total length:		27:16

Side two
No.	Title	Length
12.	"I Had A Dream"	2:45
13.	"Crazy Love"	1:28
14.	"Hey Joe"	2:08
15.	"Walking the Cow"	1:34
16.	"Laurie"	2:32
17.	"Honey I Sure Miss You"	2:14
18.	"Memphis"	1:21
19.	"Rock & Roll/EGA"	4:37
20.	"I Will Be Free"	4:26
21.	"True Love Will Find You In The End"	1:48
22.	"Foxy Girl"	3:58
Total length:		28:59
