= Angst Is Not a Weltanschauung =

Studio album by B. Fleischmann
- Released: 14 November 2008
- Recorded: June 2008 – July 2008
- Studio: Amann Studios
- Genre: Electronic
- Length: 54:51
- Label: Morr Music

B. Fleischmann chronology
Melancholie (2007)	Angst Is Not a Weltanschauung (2008)	I'm Not Ready for the Grave Yet (2012)

Angst Is Not a Weltanschauung is a solo studio album by B. Fleischmann. It was released on Morr Music on 14 November 2008.

== Critical reception ==
Professional ratings
Review scores
Source	Rating
AllMusic	4/5 stars
Pitchfork	6.9/10
PopMatters	6/10 stars

Jennifer Kelly of PopMatters gave the album 6 stars out of 10, stating: "There are a handful of all-electronics cuts that showcase Fleischmann's skill with rhythm (he's trained as a drummer) and playful mood." Roque Strew of Pitchfork gave the album a 6.9 out of 10, writing: "All the way up to this most recent release, recorded in the wake of a friend's death, Fleischmann's subtly uplifting tunes have never lost the through-line of melancholy that winds back to his Morr Music debut, Pop Loops for Breakfast." He added, "Angst continues that upward curve of building complexity and nuance, owing no small debt to the chorus of new, colorful, delicate voices that, to take a phrase from his closing song, fill up Fleischmann's castles of memory." Ned Raggett of AllMusic gave the album 4 stars out of 5, commenting that "possibly one of his best qualities is simply how he uses his guest singers, especially Sweet William Van Ghost."

== Track listing ==
All lyrics are written by B. Fleischmann, except where noted; all music is composed by Fleischmann, except where noted

No.	Title	Lyrics	Music	Length
1.	"Hello"	Sweet William Van Ghost		2:52
2.	"24.12."			3:47
3.	"Last Time We Met at a T&TT Concert"			6:11
4.	"In Trains"			3:53
5.	"Still See You Smile"			3:41
6.	"Phones, Machines and King Kong"	Daniel Johnston	Daniel Johnston; Fleischmann	3:53
7.	"The Market"			5:31
8.	"Playtime"			8:32
9.	"Even Your Glasses Miss Your Eyes"			14:37
Total length:				54:51

== Personnel ==
Credits adapted from liner notes.

- B. Fleischmann – vocals (5, 9), re-arrangement (6), performance, recording, mixing, mastering
- Sweet William Van Ghost – vocals (1, 2, 4)
- Marilies Jagsch – vocals (2, 4)
- Christian Dolezal – additional guitar (3, 4)
- Daniel Johnston – vocals (6)
- Christoph Kurzmann – re-arrangement (6)
- Christoph Amann – recording, mixing, mastering
- Jan Kruse – artwork
