= Is and Always Was =

Studio album by Daniel Johnston
- Released: October 6, 2009
- Length: 35:00
- Label: Eternal Yip Eye Music
- Producer: Jason Falkner

Daniel Johnston chronology
Lost and Found (2006)	Is and Always Was (2009)	Beam Me Up! (2010)

Professional ratings
Review scores
Source	Rating
The Guardian	4/5 stars
Pitchfork Media	(7.1/10)
Spin	3.5/5 stars

Is And Always Was is the seventeenth album by Daniel Johnston released in 2009. The album is noted for its upbeat sound in comparison to previous albums.

== Track listing ==
All tracks are written by Daniel Johnston.

No.	Title	Length
1.	"Mind Movies"	3:01
2.	"Fake Records of Rock and Roll"	3:34
3.	"Queenie the Doggie"	3:34
4.	"High Horse"	2:33
5.	"Without You"	3:13
6.	"I Had Lost My Mind"	1:20
7.	"Freedom"	1:45
8.	"Tears"	3:22
9.	"Is and Always Was"	3:02
10.	"Lost in My Infinite Memory"	3:03
11.	"Light of Day"	6:34
