= Freak Brain =

Studio album by Danny & The Nightmares
- Released: August 2005
- Label: Sympathy Records
- Producer: Jason

Danny & The Nightmares chronology
Fear Yourself (2003)	Freak Brain (2005)	Lost and Found (2006)

Freak Brain is a 2005 album released by Danny & The Nightmares. It is their second full-length album.

== Track listing ==
All songs written by Danny & the Nightmares.

1. "Haunted House" – 3:01
2. "The Lord Loves You" – 3:34
3. "Twilight Zone Love" – 3:34
4. "Freak Brain" – 2:33
5. "Jesus Boy" – 3:13
6. "See Satan Die" – 1:20
7. "Lucifer Tonite" – 1:45
8. "Happy Valentines Day" – 3:22
9. "Souvenir" – 3:02
10. "Soldier" – 3:03
11. "Pretend You're Dead" – 6:34
12. "Hell Chick Of Rock N Roll" – 6:34

== Credits ==
=== Danny and The Nightmares ===
Daniel Johnston - vocals, piano (5, 10), guitar (4, 6–8), bass guitar (2, 3, 12), drums (11)

Jason Damron - guitar (1–3, 9, 11, 12), Farfisa (1, 5, 8), bass guitar (5–10), keyboard (12)

Bridget Gallo - drums (1–3, 5, 6, 8–10, 12), flute (7)

John Troy - bass guitar (1)

Rodney Elliot - Farfisa (2)

Mark Richardson - bass guitar (7)
