= Yip/Jump Music =

1983 album by Daniel Johnston

Studio album by Daniel Johnston
- Released: 1983
- Recorded: April – Summer 1983
- Genre: Lo-fi
- Length: 61:45
- Labels: Self-released; Stress Records; Homestead Records; Eternal Yip Eye Music
- Producer: Daniel Johnston

Daniel Johnston chronology
More Songs of Pain (1983)	Yip/Jump Music (1983)	Hi, How Are You (1983)

Professional ratings
Review scores
Source	Rating
AllMusic	4/5 stars
NME	8/10 stars

Yip/Jump Music is the fifth self-released music cassette album by singer-songwriter Daniel Johnston, recorded over the summer of 1983. The album was re-released on cassette in 1986 by Stress records, and in 1988 released on CD and double LP by Homestead Records. The album has been re-released twice by Eternal Yip Eye Music: once in 2003 on CD and CD-R, and once in 2007 as a double vinyl LP.

Yip/Jump Music is the first album to feature Johnston on the chord organ. It was recorded in his brother's garage in Texas.

== Background ==
In early 1983, Johnston's family became increasingly concerned about his mental and emotional health. His brother Dick offered to have Daniel stay with him over the summer in his home in Houston, Texas while he worked at Astroworld. Until that point, Daniel had been living and recording in his parents' home in West Virginia, and following the relocation, no longer had access to this piano heard throughout his earlier tapes. Johnston instead purchased a chord organ and converted his brother's garage into a recording studio. Along with the chord organ, Johnston also performed tracks on a detuned ukulele, most noticeably on "Sorry Entertainer", which concludes with Johnston strumming the instrument's four strings. Yip/Jump Music was recorded throughout 1983, with sessions beginning in April and concluding before Hi, How Are You was recorded in September.

According to the album's liner notes, most of the material was written in May 1983, but a handful of songs originated a month prior in April. The latter songs include "Dead Lover's Twisted Heart", "Love Defined (The Bible)", "Museum Of Love" and "I Remember Painfully". An earlier version of "Love Defined" featuring piano can be found on the Lost Recordings collection.

The album makes several references to Johnston's relocation. Most notably in "Worried Shoes" and "Chord Organ Blues". The latter opens with the line "Everything's Big In Texas, you know it is / I think I might have made a big mistake". Yip/Jump also features several pop culture references, with songs dedicated to The Beatles, Casper The Friendly Ghost, Danny Rapp, and King Kong, the latter of which Johnston used as a metaphor for heartache.

Stylistically, the album uses typical progressions from rock and roll, doo-wop and religious hymns, with a definitive and notable influence from The Beatles.

== Legacy ==
Johnston would later re-record 'Casper' for three separate albums, Continued Story (1985), Merry Christmas (1988), and It's Spooky (1989), the latter of which is a studio take and appeared only as a bonus track on the CD edition. On Johnston's online store, Yip/Jump is referred to as 'The most popular Daniel Johnston album of all.'

In 1987, The Dead Milkmen would include a cover of "Rocket Ship" on their album Bucky Fellini. The following year, Johnston collaborators Jad Fair and Kramer recorded a version of "King Kong" for their album Roll Out The Barrel, featuring Kim Gordon and Thurston Moore. In 1989, Half Japanese, a group that featured both Fair and Kramer, recorded "I Live For Love" for their album The Band That Would Be King. In 1990, Yo La Tengo recorded a version of "Speeding Motorcycle" on their album Fakebook, and a year later, The Pastels recorded their version.

By 1993, Kurt Cobain had included Yip/Jump Music at number 35 in his top 50 albums list, and The Bartlebees recorded a cover of "Casper The Friendly Ghost". The following year Kathy McCarty released her Daniel Johnston tribute album, Dead Dog's Eyeball, which featured four songs from Yip/Jump Music - "Rocket Ship", "Sorry Entertainer", "Museum of Love" and "The Creature". That same year, Half Japanese included a cover of "King Kong" on their album BOO! Live In Europe 1992. In 1995, "Casper The Friendly Ghost" was featured in the cult film Kids, and Mary Lou Lord covered "Speeding Motorcycle" for her self-titled EP.

Groovie Ghoulies covered "Love Defined" on a split 10 inch EP, released in 1999.

On the 2004 album The Late Great Daniel Johnston, four selections from Yip/Jump Music were included: Clem Snide's version of "Don't Let the Sun Go Down on Your Grievances", Calvin Johnson's "Sorry Entertainer", Starlight Mints' "Dead Lover's Twisted Heart" and Tom Waits' "King Kong". Waits also included the latter on his 2006 album Orphans: Brawlers, Bawlers & Bastards. In 2005, Kathy McCarty released an extended version of "Dead Dogs Eyeball", featuring an abridged version of "Worried Shoes". In 2006, Robert Deeble covered "Speeding Motorcycle" and the tribute album I Killed The Monster was released, featuring Dot Allison performing "Don't Let The Sun Go Down On Your Grievances" and Sufjan Stevens' "Worried Shoes". In 2008, B. Fleischmann covered "King Kong" on his album Angst Is Not A Weltanschauung!.

When NME reviewed the album in 2009, they awarded it 8/10 stars, simply saying, "Despite – possibly because – of their simple renderings, the songs shine". The song "Worried Shoes" was also featured in the movie Where The Wild Things Are, performed by Karen O. Her version of "Worried Shoes" also featured in the 2009 film Tell Them Anything You Want: A Portrait of Maurice Sendak. Mike Doughty covered "Casper the Friendly Ghost" on his album Sad Man Happy Man. In 2012, M. Ward covered "Sweetheart" on his album A Wasteland Companion. The following year, Adrian Crowley and James Yorkston recorded a cover of "Don't Let The Sun Go Down On Your Grievances" for their Johnston tribute mini-album, My Yoke Is Heavy. In 2014 The Unicorns released their cover of "Rocket Ship" as a bonus track from their 2003 album Who Will Cut Our Hair When We're Gone?.

Shortly following Johnston's death, The Irish Times published a retrospective on the artist; the article described his music as "The Beatles as being sung with sincerity and intensity [...] that the cliches take on a real emotional power". In November 2019, Ben Lee released his cover of "Speeding Motorcycle" on his album Quarter Century Classix.

In June 2021, the album was reviewed by Fruzsina Vida for The New Yorker; Vida described it as "a unique and often bizarre spin on these old themes [loneliness and unrequited love], reducing them to an almost childlike interpretation, rendering his songs rare and untouched by clichés". She also commented on the production style, saying that on first listen it was distracting, "as Johnston seemingly milks his trademark DIY aesthetic for all it's worth". The following month, American singer-songwriter Sasami released a cover of "Sorry Entertainer", similar in length to Calvin Johnson's version, and in style to Kathy McCarty's rock version.

== Track listing ==
All tracks are written by Daniel Johnston, except where noted. All tracks produced by Johnston.

Side one
No.	Title	Length
1.	"Chord Organ Blues"	4:03
2.	"The Beatles"	2:25
3.	"Sorry Entertainer"	2:19
4.	"Speeding Motorcycle"	3:21
5.	"Casper The Friendly Ghost"	2:58
6.	"Don't Let The Sun Go Down On Your Grievances"	3:19
7.	"Danny Don't Rapp"	2:53
8.	"Sweetheart"	1:56
9.	"King Kong"	5:43
10.	"The Creature / Third Chair"	1:27
Total length:		30:24

Side two
No.	Title	Writer(s)	Length
11.	"I Live For Love"		3:21
12.	"Almost Got Hit By A Truck"		3:58
13.	"Worried Shoes"		6:32
14.	"Dead Lover's Twisted Heart"		1:12
15.	"Rocket Ship"		5:01
16.	"God"		2:30
17.	"Love Defined"	The Bible	0:55
18.	"Museum Of Love"		4:18
19.	"Rarely"		0:50
20.	"I Remember Painfully"		2:44
Total length:			31:21

== Release history ==
Year	Label	Format	Region	Notes
1983	Self-released	Cassette	USA	
1986	Stress Records	Cassette	USA	
1989	Homestead Records	Cassette	USA	
1989	Homestead Records	CD	USA	
1989	Homestead Records	LP	USA	
1989	Boudisque	LP	Holland	
2003	Eternal Yip Eye Music	CD-R	USA	
2006	Eternal Yip Eye Music	CD	USA	
2007	Eternal Yip Eye Music	LP	USA	
2009	Eternal Yip Eye Music	CD	USA/Europe	
2014	Eternal Yip Eye Music	Cassette	USA	
2018	Feraltone	LP	USA	3xLP box set also containing 'Hi How Are You'

== Credits ==
- Daniel Johnston - Vocals, Chord Organ, Ukulele (3), Trumpet (10)
