= The Humbucking Coil =

Studio album by B. Fleischmann
- Released: 10 February 2006
- Recorded: September 2005
- Studio: Amann Studios
- Genre: Electronic
- Length: 43:31
- Label: Morr Music
- Producer: B. Fleischmann; Christoph Amann; Christof Kurzmann

B. Fleischmann chronology
Welcome Tourist (2003)	The Humbucking Coil (2006)	Melancholie (2007)

The Humbucking Coil is a solo studio album by B. Fleischmann. It was released on Morr Music on 10 February 2006.

== Critical reception ==
Professional ratings
Aggregate scores
Source	Rating
Metacritic	74/100
Review scores
Source	Rating
PopMatters	7/10 stars
Prefix	7.0/10
Stylus Magazine	B
Tiny Mix Tapes	3/5 stars

At Metacritic, which assigns a weighted average score out of 100 to reviews from mainstream critics, the album received an average score of 74, based on 8 reviews, indicating "generally favorable reviews".

Derek Miller of Stylus Magazine gave the album a grade of B, stating: "With The Humbucking Coil, Fleischmann retreats into more organic territory, flushing out guitar textures and marrowed synth lines with the natural flesh of human drumming given cosmetic whiskering." Split Foster of Tiny Mix Tapes gave the album 3 stars out of 5, writing: "A languid mood piece with discreet variations, Coil is a pleasant, if homogeneous, listening experience."

== Track listing ==
All lyrics are written by B. Fleischmann, except where noted; all music is composed by Fleischmann

No.	Title	Lyrics	Length
1.	"Broken Monitors"		7:08
2.	"Gain"	Christof Kurzmann	4:44
3.	"Composure"		5:34
4.	"First Times"		5:10
5.	"Phones and Machines"		5:04
6.	"Static Grate"		4:24
7.	"From To"	Christof Kurzmann	5:49
8.	"Aldebaran Waltz"		5:38
Total length:			43:31

== Personnel ==
Credits adapted from liner notes.

- B. Fleischmann – performance, production, mixing
- Christoph Amann – production, recording, mixing
- Christof Kurzmann – vocals (2, 7), clarinet (6), production, mixing
- Human Empire – artwork
