= The Electric Ghosts =

Studio album by Daniel Johnston & Jack Medicine
- Released: 2006
- Label: Important Records
- Producer: Kramer; Mad Francis; Paul Rubenstein

The Electric Ghosts is a collaboration between Daniel Johnston and Jack Medicine (aka Don Goede), released in 2006 on Important Records.

Don Goede (one of the original founders of Soft Skull Press) became tour manager/caretaker for Daniel Johnston in 1999, for at least 100 shows. The album is a result of songs recorded by the pair in hotel rooms before and after performances. The cover illustration is by Ron English.

== Track listing ==
1. "Sweetheart (Frito Lay)" (Johnston)
2. "Goodbye to That Girl" (Johnston & Medicine)
3. "Pain in My Heart" (Johnston & Medicine)
4. "Summer Jazz" (Medicine/Katz)
5. "Another Fucking Song About the Rain" (Medicine)
6. "Row Boat (Fruit Loops)" (Johnston)
7. "Blue Skies Will Haunt You From Now On" (Johnston & Medicine)
8. "Scary Monsters" (Bowie)
9. Hidden track

== Credits ==
- Daniel Johnston - vocals, guitar
- Jack Medicine - vocals, guitar
- Jade Nuss - lead guitar
- Mad Francis - vocals, drums, bass, piano
- Chris Bullock - Moss organ, piano
- Paul Rubenstein - guitar, ubertar, mechanical monk, drums, percussion, electric saron
- Tess (track 7), Kids of PS 124, Brooklyn (track 8) - backing vocals
