= Why Me? (album) =

Live album by Daniel Johnston
- Released: June 2000
- Recorded: June 6, 1999
- Label: Trikont

Daniel Johnston chronology
Frankenstein Love (1998)	Why Me? (2000)	Rejected Unknown (2001)

Why Me? is a live album recorded in Germany by Daniel Johnston.

== Track listing ==
All tracks are written by Daniel Johnston except where noted.

No.	Title	Writer(s)	Length
1.	"Encore"		0:45
2.	"I Had A Dream"		2:23
3.	"I Hate Myself"		1:45
4.	"History Of Our Love (Broken)"		3:05
5.	"Kool-Aid"		2:46
6.	"Live And Let Die"	Paul McCartney	3:23
7.	"Folly"		3:31
8.	"Frustrated Artist"		2:57
9.	"Spook"	Brian Beattie	1:51
10.	"Silly Love"		1:20
11.	"Bloody Rainbow"		2:58
12.	"Everlasting Love"		4:14
13.	"Try To Love"		3:42
14.	"Wishing You Well"		2:32
15.	"Wedding Ring Bell Blues"		2:58
16.	"Like A Dream"		4:12
17.	"Tuesday Waltz"		3:26
18.	"Sublime Groove"		2:36
19.	"Without Love"		2:46
20.	"Love Is Like A Toy"		3:55
21.	"Death"		4:24
22.	"Nothing"		5:18
