= Walking the Cow =

Song by Daniel Johnston

Song by Daniel Johnston

from the album Hi, How Are You
- Released: 1983
- Genre: lo-fi; outsider
- Length: 3:35
- Label: Stress
- Songwriter: Daniel Johnston

"Walking the Cow" is a song written and recorded by singer-songwriter Daniel Johnston from his 1983 album Hi, How Are You. The title was inspired by an illustration on a wrapper for Blue Bell ice cream depicting a young girl attempting to lead a reluctant cow by its reins.

Johnston recorded an updated version of the song on his 2010 album Beam Me Up!

== Covers ==
Austin band The Reivers included their version of the song as a bonus track on the 1988 CD release of Translate Slowly, their 1984 debut album.

During Johnston's wave of popularity in the early 1990s, several musicians released covers of "Walking the Cow". Mike Watt's group Firehose included a version on Flyin' the Flannel (1991). Kathy McCarty of Glass Eye included it on her 1994 Daniel Johnston tribute album Dead Dog's Eyeball. Also in 1994, the Austin surf-rock band Whirled Peas released a version on their second and final album, War and Peas. In October of that year, Pearl Jam covered the song in a performance at Neil Young's Bridge School Benefit concert, and this subsequently became available on the bootleg album In Rock We Trust.

Watt performed the song on a 1995 solo tour; a recording opens his live album Ring Spiel Tour '95, released in 2016. Pearl Jam's Eddie Vedder used the song to open every show of his 2008 solo tour.

It was covered by A Camp on their 2001 album A Camp.

On the 2004 tribute album The Late Great Daniel Johnston: Discovered Covered, TV on the Radio contributed their cover of the song.

On September 11, 2020 — the one-year anniversary of Johnston's death — Electric Lady Studios released a video tribute album, Honey I Sure Miss You, via YouTube. It included a cover of "Walking the Cow" by the indie-pop band Lucius.
