= Hi, How Are You (video game) =

2009 video game

- Developers: Dr Fun Fun, LLC; Smashing Studios, LLC
- Platforms: iPhone, iPod Touch
- Release: NA: September 24, 2009
- Genre: Platform
- Mode: Single-player

Hi, How Are You is a third-person platform game that is based on the art and music of Daniel Johnston. It was developed by Peter Franco and Stephen Broumley of Dr Fun Fun and Smashing Studios for the iPhone and iPod Touch. Players control Jeremiah the frog and navigate platform mazes in order to win back his true love from Satan.

== Gameplay ==
In Hi, How Are You, the player takes the control over Jeremiah the Innocent. He is based on a character from the Johnston's mural on the University of Texas campus. At first, he starts off as a human but is changed into a frog by Satan.

The main goal is to direct Jeremiah along the path by tilting the device without falling off. To complete a level, all green blocks must be touched before proceeding to the exit. In order to earn a silver trophy, the player must touch all the green blocks and red blocks or all the green blocks and beat the clock. In order to earn a gold trophy, the player must touch all green blocks, all red blocks and beat the clock. There are numerous obstacles and enemies that challenge the player in each level. The game also makes use of the device's accelerometer to control the characters.

== Reception ==
Reception

Review scores
Publication	Score
Pocket Gamer	3.5/5
TouchArcade	3.5/5
Slide to Play	3/4
The A.V. Club	B

Hi, How Are You was featured in The New York Times on September 28, 2009 and was described as "a psycho-religious version of Frogger". Pocket Gamer stated that "Hi, How Are You sets a new iPhone benchmark aesthetically". The soundtrack, consisting of several songs by Johnston, was praised by Slide to Play, noting that it adds to the game's tone.
