= Three-minute pop song =

Song lasting no more than three minutes

A three-minute pop song is a cliché that describes the archetype of popular music, based on the average running-length of a typical single. The root of the "three-minute" length is likely derived from the original format of 78 rpm-speed phonograph records: at about 3 to 5 minutes per side, it is just long enough for the recording of a complete song.

The rules of the Eurovision Song Contest do not permit studio versions entries to be longer than three minutes. The longest song of the 2025 edition of the Eurovision Song Contest was 3:08. (Lucio Corsi's "Volevo Essere Un Duro")

== See also ==
- Single (music), section "Early history"
- Phonograph record, section "78 rpm recording time"
- Phonograph cylinder, section "Early development"
