= Dead Dog's Eyeball: Songs of Daniel Johnston =

Studio album by Kathy McCarty
- Released: 1994
- Label: Bar/None
- Producer: Brian Beattie, Kathy McCarty

Kathy McCarty chronology
Dead Dog's Eyeball: Songs of Daniel Johnston (1994)	Sorry Entertainer (1995)

Dead Dog's Eyeball: Songs of Daniel Johnston is an album by the American musician Kathy McCarty, released in 1994. It contains 19 renditions of songs written by Daniel Johnston. McCarty became aware of Johnston when he opened for her former band, Glass Eye, in 1985. McCarty supported the album with a North American tour. An EP of additional Johnston material, Sorry Entertainer, was released in 1995. Dead Dog's Eyeball was reissued in 2005, with bonus tracks and videos. Johnston and his parents were fans of the album.

== Production ==
The album was produced by Brian Beattie and McCarty; the recording sessions, mostly at a friend's home studio, cost around $5,000 and began in July 1993. McCarty was initially attracted to Johnston's gift for melody. She thought that many of the early-1990s Johnston covers by other musicians did not capture the essence of his songs, an assessment shared by the Spin Alternative Record Guide. Although the album's release coincided with Johnston's Fun, McCarty started the project at a time when Johnston's career seemed uncertain due to a hospitalization. Most of the songs came from tapes Johnston recorded in the mid-1980s. McCarty kept Johnston's pronoun choices and pronunciation errors. "Living Life" was McCarty's favorite song; it was used over the closing credits of Before Sunrise. "Running Water" was recorded in a University of Texas philosophy department bathroom.

== Critical reception ==
Professional ratings
Review scores
Source	Rating
AllMusic	4.5/5 stars
Calgary Herald	B+
Entertainment Weekly	A−
Houston Press	4/5 stars
Melody Maker	Recommended
MusicHound Rock: The Essential Album Guide	4.5/5 stars

Entertainment Weekly wrote: "A sympathetic interpreter, she fleshes out Johnston’s stark recordings, unearthing veins of compassion and sadness not heard on the originals." Greil Marcus, in Artforum, determined that "often the oddity of the tunes falls short of their length," but praised "Walking the Cow". Newsday concluded that the musicians "turn the bare bones of his recordings into rich, imaginative small-scale treatments that bolster the bizarre lyrics and winning melodies to create a dynamic compound of rare charm." The Dallas Morning News called the album "the best LP to come out of Texas this year [and] a far more satisfying representation of Mr. Johnston's talent than his own album, Fun."

The Calgary Herald noted that "it is as impossible to pinpoint this album as it is to not be charmed by its whimsy, wit and wondrous way of looking at the world." The Los Angeles Times opined that McCarty "handles the diverse material with a flexible alto that has the sweetness and guilelessness to capture Johnston's innocence, the theatricality to underscore his wit and emotional extremes and the strangeness to do justice to his weirdness." The Philadelphia Inquirer deemed the album "one of the finer obscure pleasures of 1994."

AllMusic wrote: "McCarty fleshes out Johnston's music without covering up its original charm. She seems to grasp both the inherent darkness and irresistible poppiness in his songs." The Austin American-Statesman listed Dead Dog's Eyeball as the third best Austin album of the 1990s. The Austin Chronicle, in 2005, stated that the album "remains the premier articulation of Johnston's songwriting prowess more than a decade after its initial release," writing that "no serious Austin music collection should be without it."

== Track listing ==
No.	Title	Length
1.	"Intro"
2.	"Walking the Cow"
3.	"Rocket Ship"
4.	"Living Life"
5.	"I Had a Dream"
6.	"I Am a Baby (In My Universe)"
7.	"Hey Joe"
8.	"Like a Monkey in a Zoo"
9.	"Sorry Entertainer"
10.	"Desperate Man Blues"
11.	"Oh No!"
12.	"Hate Song"
13.	"Golly Gee"
14.	"Going Down"
15.	"Museum of Love"
16.	"Wild West Virginia"
17.	"Running Water"
18.	"Grievances"
19.	"The Creature"
