= Rejected Unknown =

Studio album by Daniel Johnston
- Released: October 9, 2001
- Recorded: 1998–1999; Waller, Texas
- Genre: Outsider; rock
- Length: 58:49
- Label: Gammon
- Producer: Brian Beattie

Daniel Johnston chronology
Why me? (2001)	Rejected Unknown (2001)	Fear Yourself (2003)

Singles from Rejected Unknown
- 1. "Dream Scream" / "Funeral Girl" Released: 1999; 2. "Impossible Love" Released: 2001

Professional ratings
Review scores
Source	Rating
AllMusic	3/5 stars
Pitchfork	(7.5/10)

Rejected Unknown is a 2001 album by acclaimed outsider musician Daniel Johnston. The title references the decision by Atlantic Records to drop him from the label after the commercial failure of his only major-label album, 1994's Fun. Rejected Unknown was produced by Austin producer and former Glass Eye member Brian Beattie. A 7-inch limited edition EP called Dream Scream, featuring that song and "Funeral Girl", was released in 1998 on Pickled Egg Records.

== Background ==
Following the release of his 1994 Atlantic Records album Fun, Johnston waited for contact from the label on producing a follow-up, but, despite insistence from the label that Johnston had not been dropped, he was never contacted, and a lack of activity and medication caused Johnston to become overweight. In 1995, Johnston worked with producer Brian Beattie on the song "Casper" for the Larry Clark film Kids, which began a prosperous working relationship. Beattie and Johnston submitted a number of tracks to Atlantic Records as material for a potential album, but were dropped by the label instead. Beattie had convinced Johnston that leaving Atlantic was good, as they were 'unsatisfiable' and 'didn't understand.'

During this period, Johnston began to make several live appearances, including five live dates in 1997, six in 1998, five in 1999 and eleven in 2000; with each year featuring performances at SXSW. A June 1999 performance at Radio Fritz, Germany, became Johnston's first professionally recorded live album, Why Me?.

In April 1999, Johnston recorded and self-released the Danny And The Nightmares album, co-written with Jason Lee Damron.

=== Promotion ===
In March 1999, it was announced that Johnston had been signed to Tim/Kerr Records and that they would release 'Rejected/Unknown' but that illness within the label's management team was preventing its release - and ultimately the album was released in October 2001 by Gammon Records; although limited copies of the album released by Newimprovedmusic, Which Records, and Pickled Egg Records were available as early as 1999.

This was Johnston's first album to be supported by a tour, which took place between December 2001 and July 2002.

=== Reviews ===
Upon the album's October 2001 release, it was positively reviewed by Pitchfork. In their 2019 Daniel Johnston obituary, NME called Rejected Unknown a 'stunning career best.'

== Track listing ==
All tracks are written by Daniel Johnston except where noted.

No.	Title	Writer(s)	Length
1.	"Impossible Love"		2:56
2.	"Funeral Girl"		4:37
3.	"Dream Scream"		5:39
4.	"Love Forever"		4:09
5.	"Cathy Cline"		4:04
6.	"Davinare"		3:05
7.	"Party"		5:16
8.	"The Spook"	Johnston / Brian Beattie	2:52
9.	"Girl of My Dreams"		4:31
10.	"Billions / Rock"	Johnston / Beattie / Craig Ross / Dave Jungen / Peter LaFond	7:11
11.	"Thrill"		3:22
12.	"Favorite Darling Girl"		2:14
13.	"Some Time Spent in Heaven"	Johnston / Ross	2:38
14.	"Wedding Ring Bells Blues"		2:56
15.	"I Lose"		3:12
Total length:			58:49

== Credits ==
- Daniel Johnston — Vocals, piano, whirly piano on 3, acoustic guitar, soda and toilet noises on 6, party on 7, drums on 13
- Brian Beattie — Bass, organ on 2, 5, 6, 7, 9, 14, guitar on 2, 6, 8, 9, 11, acoustic guitar on 1, 13, backing vocals on 1, 14, drums on 2, acoustic bass and accordion on 5, electric guitar on 6, chair noises and party on 7, electric piano on 9, handclaps on 11, tambourine on 12

=== Guests ===
- John Paul Keenan — Drums on 1, 3, 8, 9, 14
- Craig Ross — Guitar on 4, 10, 14, electric guitar on 13
- Dave Cameron — Drums on 7, 11, 15, party on 7
- Peter LaFond — Guitar on 1, 4, 10
- David Jungen — Drums on 4, 10
- Bill Anderson — Guitar on 7, 15, party on 7
- Cricket — Legs on 2, 3
- Barbara Marino — Baritone Saxophone on 2
- Collette Haney — Cello on 5
- Wammo — Backing Vocals, Bored Party on 7
- John Hagen — Cello on 12
- Rusty Traps — Drums on 12
- Will Indian — Guitar on 12
- Cindy Lee & Shane Madden — Violin on 5
- Spot — Viola on 6
- Susannah Erler — Violin on 6

Technical

- Brian Beatitie — Producer, Engineer
- Roger Seibel — Mastered by
