= Beam Me Up! =

Studio album by Daniel Johnston
- Released: June 17, 2010
- Length: 40:16
- Label: Hazelwood Records

Daniel Johnston chronology
Is and Always Was (2009)	Beam Me Up! (2010)	Space Ducks (2012)

Beam Me Up! is the eighteenth and final album by Daniel Johnston released on June 17, 2010. The album was recorded with the 11-piece BEAM orchestra, and features reworked versions of Johnston's older songs along with three new songs: "Sarah Drove Around In Her Car", "Mask", and "Last Song".

== Track listing ==
All songs written by Daniel Johnston.

1. "Sarah Drove Around In Her Car"
2. "Syrup Of Tears"
3. "Must"
4. "True Love Will Find You In The End"
5. "Wicked World"
6. "Mask"
7. "Try To Love"
8. "Devil Town"
9. "Love Enchanted"
10. "Walking the Cow"
11. "Last Song"
12. "The Beatles"

== Personnel ==
- Daniel Johnston – vocals, guitar

BEAM Orchestra

- Michiel Stekelenburg – acoustic guitar, electric guitar
- Bruno Nelissen – electric guitar
- Andreas van Zoelen - bass saxophone, baritone saxophone
- Guido Nijs – soprano saxophone, tenor saxophone, alto saxophone
- Hans Sparla – trombone, accordion
- Yvonne van de Pol – violin
- Jacqueline Hamelink – cello
- Eric van der Westen – double bass
- Bart van Dongen – keyboards
- Richard Van Kruijsdijk – keyboards, electronic drums
- Yonga Sun – drums
