= Glass Eye =

American art rock band

Glass Eye were an influential art rock group based in Austin, Texas, and were primarily active from 1983 to 1993. Popular in Austin, and on the college radio and tour circuit, the band's unusual and unique musical style, blending melodic hooks with dissonance and occasional tendencies for the avant-garde, delighted critics. Considered "one of Austin's most popular and influential bands", their commercial success never matched their critical acclaim. Through self-release, and being signed to Wrestler and Bar/None Records, they released four LPs, two EPs and one single, and when the band regrouped in 2006, they released their previously lost final LP, Every Woman's Fantasy, on their own label, Glass Eye Records.

== History ==
Glass Eye formed in 1983, and became regulars in the post-punk Texas music circuit. An episode of the MTV show Cutting Edge from 1985 featured Glass Eye (and other bands like The Reivers, Timbuk 3, and the seminal singer-songwriter Daniel Johnston) as examples of the New Sincerity musical movement. Johnston played his first public performance opening for Glass Eye. He had given his self-recorded tape Hi, How Are You to Glass Eye frontwoman Kathy McCarty, who didn't listen to it until after Johnston asked her what she thought of the record (she reportedly praised it, then went home and listened to it immediately afterwards). McCarty and Johnston later dated briefly; their relationship is documented in the 2006 Jeff Feuerzeig film The Devil and Daniel Johnston, as well as the Glass Eye song "Kicking the Dog".

The original line-up of Glass Eye consisted of:

- Kathy McCarty - vocals, guitar
- Brian Beattie - vocals, bass
- Scott Marcus - drums, vocals
- Stella Weir - keyboard, vocals

This lineup was featured on their first two records, Marlo (1985) (which a Texas Monthly reviewer called "one of the most gripping independent releases from Texas in recent memory") and Huge (1986) which was dropped by the label shortly after release. In 1987, Marcus and Weir left the band. Sheri Lane played keyboards and guitar and Dave Cameron, now Lisa Cameron following a name change, played drums on the 1988 album Bent By Nature. Marcus and Weir rejoined the band in 1989 and the band released Hello Young Lovers that year and the "Satellite of Love/Rock of Hand" single in 1991.

Glass Eye's albums were produced primarily by Beattie and engineered by various contributors, including Mike Stewart, Stuart Sullivan, and Roy Taylor. Beattie had previously played bass in several bands including the Stamford, CT based punk bands Tapeworm and Safety Patrol, as well as the initial line-up of the Californian punk band Fang. McCarty played with the Austin all-woman band Buffalo Gals as well as a Berkeley, California based band Sinequan with former Safety Patrol member Scott Fletcher before joining Glass Eye. Scott Marcus also was in Safety Patrol. Marcus, Weir and McCarty all had cameo roles in the 1991 Richard Linklater film Slacker, and the Glass Eye song "White Walls" was featured on the film's soundtrack.

== Breakup and solo careers ==
The band broke up in 1993 following some friction relating to their attempts at signing to a major label. Kathy McCarty went on to make several solo records, including the acclaimed Dead Dog's Eyeball, a cover album of Daniel Johnston songs that was re-released in 2005, and its subsequent EP, Sorry Entertainer. In 2005, she released her own record of original songs called Another Day In The Sun. In 1987, Stella Weir and Scott Marcus played in the band Prohibition for one album, Flophouse. Marcus has also played with The Asylum Street Spankers and Starfish. Brian Beattie has continued his career as a record producer, working with The Dead Milkmen, Ed Hall, Daniel Johnston, and Okkervil River among others. In 2014 Beattie released his first solo record, Ivy and the Wicker Suitcase, a musical audiodrama on disc that comes in a fully illustrated book, featuring art by his wife Valerie Fowler.

The band reformed briefly in 2006 to celebrate the release of their final album, Every Woman's Fantasy. They played several shows, including at SXSW, to publicize the album.

== Discography ==
LPs

- Huge (Wrestler Records, 1986)
- Bent By Nature (Bar/None Records, 1988)
- Hello Young Lovers (Bar/None Records, 1989)
- Every Woman's Fantasy (Glass Eye Records, 2006)

EPs/Singles

- Marlo EP (Self-released, 1985)
- Christine EP (Bar/None Records, 1989)
- "Satellite Of Love"/"Rock Of Hand" single (1991) (Bar/None Records, 1991)

== Timeline ==
Details taken from album liner credits
