= Lost and Found (Daniel Johnston album) =

Studio album by Daniel Johnston
- Released: April 2006
- Genre: Alternative rock; indie rock
- Label: Sketchbook Records
- Producer: Brian Beattie

Daniel Johnston chronology
Freak Brain (2005)	Lost and Found (2006)	Is and Always Was (2009)

Professional ratings
Review scores
Source	Rating
The Guardian	4/5 stars

Lost and Found is a 2006 album by Daniel Johnston, his 16th release since 1981.

== Track listing ==
All tracks are written by Daniel Johnston.

No.	Title	Length
1.	"Rock This Town"
2.	"Try To Love"
3.	"Beatles"
4.	"Lonely Song"
5.	"Foolin'"
6.	"Haunt"
7.	"Squiggly Lines"
8.	"Country Song"
9.	"Mrs Daniel Johnston"
10.	"History Of Our Love"
11.	"Rock Around The Christmas Tree"
12.	"It's Impossible"
13.	"Wishing You Well"
14.	"Everlasting Love"
