= B. Fleischmann =

Austrian musician

Bernhard Fleischmann
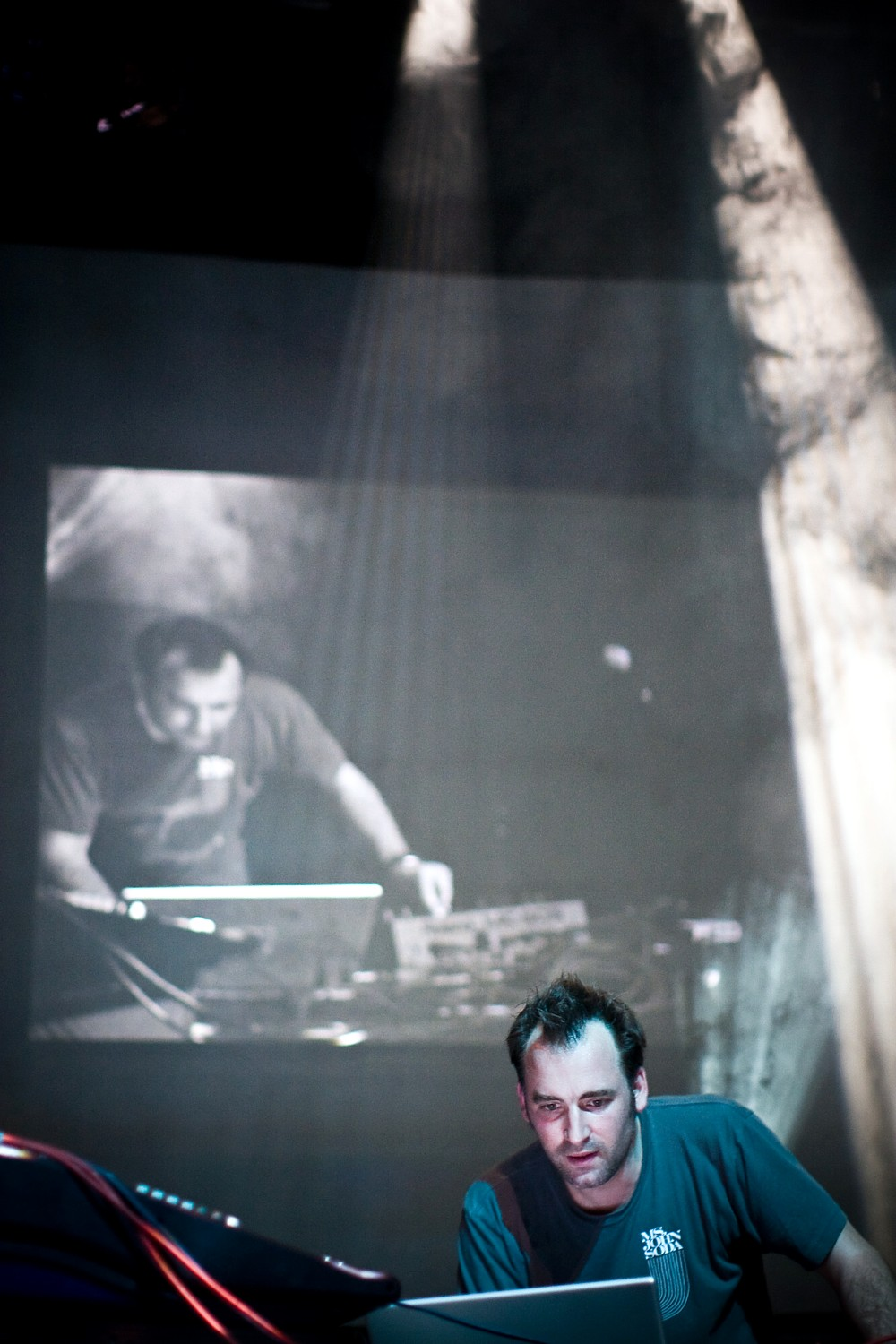

Background information
- Also known as: B. Fleischmann
- Born: 1975 (age 50–51)
- Genres: Electronic, Intelligent dance music (IDM)
- Occupation: Musician
- Labels: Morr Music, Charhizma
- Website: www.bfleischmann.com

Bernhard Fleischmann, born 1975 in Vienna, is an Austrian musician, usually known as B. Fleischmann.

Fleischmann started his musical life as a drummer, although he is better known for electronic music. He has released several albums on Morr Music and other labels.

== Discography ==
=== Solo albums ===
- Pop Loops for Breakfast (1999)
- Sidonie (1999)
- A Choir of Empty Beds (2000)
- TMP (2001)
- Welcome Tourist (2003)
- The Humbucking Coil (2006)
- Melancholie (2007)
- Angst is not a Weltanschauung (2008)
- I'm Not Ready for the Grave Yet (November 2012)
- Stop Making Fans (February 2018)
- Music for Shared Rooms (2022)

=== Groups and collaborations ===
- Duo 505 (Fleischmann & Weixelbaum), Late (2004)
- The Year Of, Slow Days (2006)
- Duo 505 (Fleischmann & Weixelbaum), Another Illusion (2008)
- Duo 505 (Fleischmann & Weixelbaum), Walzer Oder Nicht (2011)
