= Songs of Pain =

1981 album by Daniel Johnston

- A 1988 Stress Records copy

Studio album by Daniel Johnston
- Released: 1981
- Recorded: 1980–1981
- Studios: The Johnston Residence's Basement, West Virginia
- Length: 56:29
- Label: Stress Records (1988)
- Producer: Daniel Johnston

Daniel Johnston chronology
Songs of Pain (1981)	Don't Be Scared (1982)

CD-R
- Eternal Yip Eye Music CD-R cover, 2019

Professional ratings
Review scores
Source	Rating
Allmusic	2/5 stars
Pitchfork Media	8.0/10

Songs of Pain is the first album by folk singer-songwriter Daniel Johnston, recorded on a simple tape recorder and released on Compact Cassette. Johnston recorded these songs in the basement of his parents' house in West Virginia. Johnston recorded the tape between 1980 and 1981, and it was later mass produced on cassette by Stress Records in 1988, and on Compact Disc in 2003 by the label Dual Tone, together with More Songs of Pain as Early Recordings Volume 1.

== Background ==
Songs of Pain was recorded between 1980 and 1981 during Daniel Johnston's Freshman, Sophomore and Junior years studying at Kent State University in East Liverpool, Ohio. During this period, Johnston lived in his parents' basement in West Virginia, where he would make recordings to share with friends and fellow students.

In late 1979, Johnston wrote the song "Lazy", the only song he wrote during that period after dropping out of Abilene Christian University in West Texas. In 1980, he enrolled in Kent State University in East Liverpool, Ohio, where he met Laurie Allen, who would become something of a muse for Johnston. Johnston had a crush on Allen and equated her with true love and all that was good with the world. He became romantically obsessed with her, and after being complimented on his piano playing by Allen, was inspired to take up piano playing as a daily routine alongside recording his work and compiling it onto cassettes to share with his peers. The material was recorded on a $59 Sanyo cassette recorder with Radio Shack tape stock. Johnston performed most of the instrumentation and overdubbed the vocals himself.

Shortly after this, Allen relocated to Florida after her boyfriend, who was studying in Florida, graduated and became a mortician there. The departure left Johnston emotionally distraught. He saw Allen shortly afterward when he accompanied a friend to a funeral hosted at the home where she was employed. The awkward encounter which ensued inspired the song "Grievances," written in early 1980 – which in November, he jokingly described as a "fluke." In the Summer of 1980, Johnston wrote "Wicked World," which he described as giving him more confidence in his songwriting. He was 'lost in limbo land,' writing music '24 hours' with lyrics devised by his friends.

By the time the album was finished in 1981, Johnston was already in his Junior year of University. As he had no way of copying tapes at the time, each version featured a recording unique to the person to whom it was gifted. The later mass-copied version was given to musician/painter Kathy McCarty, who met Johnston circa 1985. This version was released in 1988 by Jeff Tartakov's Stress Records.

=== Sound ===
All songs feature Johnston on vocals and piano, except for "Premarital Sex", where he plays the organ. The opening track, "Grievances", introduces themes that reoccur throughout Johnston's career. He sings about his unrequited love for "the librarian", which refers to a girl named Laurie Allen who has functioned as a muse in many of Johnston's songs; this has been described as the quintessential Daniel Johnston song, including by Johnston himself. The lyrical and the musical themes of the song have been alluded to in later works, some examples include 'Museum of Love' which features an identical chord progression in its verses, as well as 'Love Defined', (From both The Lost Recordings and Yip/Jump Music) which features part of the same progression during the line 'Love does not insist on its own way'. The word "grievances" has also been reused in the song title "Don't Let the Sun Go Down on Your Grievances".

Other themes on the album are premarital sex ("Joy Without Pleasure" and "Premarital Sex"), Christianity ("A Little Story") and cannabis ("Pot Head") – the latter of which was directed at a friend of Johnston's.

As a way to fuel his art, Johnston began to record every conversation he had, re-using phrases from these recordings as lyrics and, most notably, sampling confrontations between himself and his mother on the tapes.

Bob Dylan was an influence on the album; Johnston described "Grievances" as his "Like a Rolling Stone," took inspiration from the 'Budokan' version of "I Want You" for the 'high-piercing sound' of "Urge," and wrote "Hate Song" after being inspired by lyrics in the song "Dirge." Another influence was Slim Whitman, who inspired "Wild West Virginia."

David Raposa for Pitchfork also noted an influence from The Kinks' "Lola" on the track "Wicked Will", and Billboard Magazine compared 'Urge' to material by Plastic Ono Band, as well as "Joy Without Pleasure" to the 'prim' song-writing of Paul McCartney.

== Legacy ==
In a 2003 review of the Songs of Pain CD compilation (which collects both this album and its 1983 sequel 'More Songs of Pain'), David Raposa for Pitchfork discussed the album's tracks positively, describing the material as "chilling", "jaunty" and "happy-go-lucky".

In Pitchfork's 2010 review of The Story of an Artist (a six-disc collection of Johnston's early material), Douglas Wolk described "Never Relaxed" as "The funniest thing that Johnston ever recorded", and "Living Life" as "A bloodied but unbowed power-pop tune." Wolk also compared the album to More Songs of Pain, which he called "A more accomplished if less bracing take on a lot of the same themes." On Billboard's "12 essential Daniel Johnston Tracks" article, both "Urge" and "Joy Without Pleasure" were included. Willoughby Thom, writing for The Observer's retrospective on Daniel Johnston, describes Songs of Pain favorably, calling it "Emotional and intensely beautiful", praising its sincerity, truth, and simplistic lyrics.

In July 2021, the RO2 Gallery in Dallas, Texas, hosted an exhibition of Johnston's art named after the album, Story of an Artist & Songs of Pain. In 2023, a 2xLP version of the album was released, featuring eight bonus tracks.

=== Influence ===
In Hi How Are You, a book written on Johnston's career, Songs of Pain was listed as one of Kathy McCarty's most favored albums by the artist and she included five songs from the album on her 1994 tribute to Johnston, Dead Dog's Eyeball. In 1995, her cover of "Living Life" was featured in the romantic drama film, Before Sunrise.

== Track listing ==
All tracks are written by Daniel Johnston. All tracks produced by Johnston.

Side one
No.	Title	Length
1.	"Grievances"	2:49
2.	"A Little Story"	3:30
3.	"Joy Without Pleasure"	1:55
4.	"Never Relaxed"	3:28
5.	"Brainwash"	2:40
6.	"Pot Head"	3:23
7.	"Wicked World"	2:35
8.	"Lazy"	2:41
9.	"I Save Cigarette Butts"	5:26
Total length:		28:27

Side two
No.	Title	Length
10.	"Like a Monkey in a Zoo"	3:28
11.	"Wicked Will"	1:45
12.	"An Idiot's End"	4:36
13.	"Wild West Virginia"	2:39
14.	"Since I Lost My Tooth"	1:21
15.	"Urge"	2:36
16.	"Living Life"	4:08
17.	"Tuna Ketchup"	2:06
18.	"Premarital Sex"	3:05
19.	"Don't Act Nice"	0:37
20.	"Hate Song"	2:07
Total length:		28:28

2023 vinyl re-issue bonus tracks
No.	Title	Length
21.	"Lead Belly Was An Outlaw"
22.	"I Love You (I'd Like To Read You Some Poetry)"
23.	"Why Don't You Love Me True?"
24.	"I'm A Rambling Kinda Guy"
25.	"Sleepy Lagoon"
26.	"Natalie Queen Of Weirton"
27.	"Golly Gee"
28.	"You Need A Reason" (With Tom Gruda. Sr)

== Release history ==
Year	Label	Format	Region	Notes
1988	Stress Records	Cassette	USA	
2003	Dualtone	CD	USA	As part of The Early Recordings, a 2-CD box set also containing 'More Songs of Pain'
2009	Stress Records	Cassette	USA	
2010	Munster Records	CD	Spain	As part of The Story Of An Artist, a 6-disc box set containing Johnston's albums recorded while living with his parents between 1980–1983.
2010	Munster Records	LP	Spain	As part of The Story Of An Artist, a 6-disc box set containing Johnston's albums recorded while living with his parents between 1980–1983.
2010	Eternal Yip Eye Music	Cassette	USA	
2014	Eternal Yip Eye Music	Cassette	USA	
2019	Eternal Yip Eye Music	CD-R	USA	
2023	Eternal Yip Eye Music / BMG	LP	USA	With eight outtakes as bonus tracks.
