= Space Ducks: Soundtrack =

Compilation album by Daniel Johnston
- Released: 2012
- Length: 42:12
- Label: Eternal Yip Eye Music

Daniel Johnston chronology
Beam Me Up! (2010)	Space Ducks: Soundtrack (2012)

Professional ratings
Aggregate scores
Source	Rating
Metacritic	70/100
Review scores
Source	Rating
Consequence of Sound	C+

Space Ducks: Soundtrack is a compilation album by American recording artist Daniel Johnston. It was released on Daniel Johnston's Eternal Yip Eye Label in 2012, with a later, longer version released on Feraltone in 2013. It was inspired by Johnston's comic Space Ducks: An Infinite Comic Book of Musical Greatness. It also features songs from Unknown Mortal Orchestra, Eleanor Friedberger, Deer Tick, Fruit Bats, and Lavender Diamond.

== Track listing ==
1. "Space Ducks"—Daniel Johnston
2. "American Dream"—Daniel Johnston
3. "Sense of Humor"—Daniel Johnston
4. "Come Down"—Eleanor Friedberger
5. "Evil Magic"—Fruit Bats
6. "Mean Girls Give Pleasure"—Daniel Johnston
7. "Moment of Laughter"—Lavender Diamond
8. "Satanic Planet"—Unknown Mortal Orchestra
9. "Wanting You"—Daniel Johnston
10. "Mask"—Daniel Johnston
11. "Mountain"—Daniel Johnston
12. "Space Ducks"—Deer Tick
