= The Angel and Daniel Johnston: Live at the Union Chapel =

Video by Daniel Johnston
- Released: 2008
- Recorded: 2007
- Label: Adjustable Productions
- Producer: Robert Wheeler

Professional ratings
Review scores
Source	Rating
Record Collector	5/5 stars
Magic RPM	5/5 stars
DVD Monthly	7/10 stars
Mojo Magazine	3/5 stars

The Angel and Daniel Johnston: Live at the Union Chapel is a 2008 film of Daniel Johnston's concert performance at the Union Chapel, Islington on 12 July 2007. It is directed by Antony Crofts and released by Adjustable Productions. The film also features Adem Ilhan and James Yorkston in supporting roles.

The film is the first released example of the video scuffing technique developed by producer Robert Wheeler and director Antony Crofts in response to glossy high budget productions. Many months were spent applying the process to each shot.
