= Hi, How Are You =

1983 album by Daniel Johnston

Studio album by Daniel Johnston
- Released: September 1983
- Recorded: September 1983
- Genres: Lo-fi; avant-pop; folk; blues
- Length: 30:38
- Labels: Self-released; Stress; Homestead
- Producer: Daniel Johnston

Daniel Johnston chronology
Yip/Jump Music (1983)	Hi, How Are You (1983)	Retired Boxer (1984)

Professional ratings
Review scores
Source	Rating
AllMusic	4.5/5 stars

Hi, How Are You: The Unfinished Album is the sixth self-released music cassette album by American singer-songwriter Daniel Johnston, recorded in September 1983. The subtitle refers to the length of the album; Johnston had intended to fill out the hour long cassette, as a majority of his earlier tapes had. In 1988, it was the first of Johnston’s albums to be released on vinyl, and reached a wider audience.

== Background ==
=== Recording ===
On September 1, 1983, Daniel Johnston was evicted from his brother Dick's home in Houston, Texas. Daniel had been living with Dick throughout the summer and recorded his previous album Yip/Jump Music in the garage. Following his eviction, Margie Johnston, his sister, let Daniel live with her in her San Marcos home, where he worked in pizza delivery. Margie did not have any extra furniture for Daniel, so they bought a mattress which was placed on a floor for him to sleep on. Margie notes that Daniel thrived in this environment because he was allowed to make a mess.

The backing music to the song "Desperate Man Blues" comes from a song by Johnny Dankworth titled "Desperate Dan" from the album England's Ambassador of Jazz, which Johnston owned. The track resonated heavily with Johnston, leading to its inclusion on the album.

The album is one of the most sonically varied of Johnston's early output. While earlier records found him focusing on piano or chord organ songs almost exclusively, this album blends both approaches along with experiments in tape and noise collage, and some tentative playing on a stringed instrument, referred to as a guitar, a toy guitar, or a ukulele.

=== Artwork/title ===
The album's artwork is a sketch of "Jeremiah the Frog of Innosense [sic]", a character created by Johnston inspired by an old rubber stamp box he discovered while working at AstroWorld that previous summer. The box featured a picture of a frog along with the text "Hi, How Are You?". Johnston became inspired by the phrase and remembered that he had previously used it in his song "Grievances", from Songs of Pain.

And I saw you at the funeral, you were standing there like a temple
I said, "Hi, how are you? Hello"
And I pulled up a casket and crawled in

Since he had already called back to "Grievances" countless times throughout his previous tapes, he felt it was only appropriate to continue to use the phrase as yet another call-back. "Jeremiah", the frog's name, was taken from the song "Joy to the World" by Three Dog Night, which opens with the lyric, "Jeremiah was a bullfrog".

=== Promotion ===
Daniel would promote the album through handing out copies to people he met. One individual given a copy of the album was Kathy McCarty, who said, "That weird kid is probably the only genius I've met in my life!"

This was the first Daniel Johnston album to be given a widely distributed release as a vinyl LP; it was released on Homestead Records in 1988.

== Legacy ==
In the 1988 Richard Linklater film It's Impossible to Learn to Plow by Reading Books, the unnamed main character is handed a tape by another unnamed character, played by Johnston. In the next scene, the main character listens to snippets of the album in his apartment.

In 1988, when the album was pressed on LP by Homestead Records, Mark Lerario for the Reading Eagle said that it sounded like "A basement tape haphazardly put together by deaf hippies."

The song "Big Business Monkey" appeared in the soundtrack of the 1990 film Slacker.

By 1992, Kurt Cobain began wearing a T-shirt of the album's cover, launching Johnston into mainstream popularity. Two years later, in 1994, Kathy McCarty released her Johnston tribute album, which featured five tracks from Hi How Are You.

In 1993, a mural of the album cover was painted next to the Drag near the University of Texas at Austin. In 2024, the surrounding building was demolished but the mural was preserved.

In 2006, Ty Burr Globe for the Record-Journal described "Walking the Cow" as "demented and heartbreakingly fragile".

In 2009, the song "Desperate Man Blues" was included in the play Punk Rock.

A 2015 documentary about Johnston, titled Hi, How Are You Daniel Johnston?, was named after the record.

In 2018, the Mayor of Austin, Texas, declared January 22 (Johnston's birthday) to be "Hi, How Are You Day", a day dedicated to mental health awareness funded by the non-profit organisation of the same name.

In 2019, American post-disco duo De Lux released a cover of "Get Yourself Together".

On April 9, 2021, the Johnston estate announced an NFT based on the album's cover.

== Track listing ==
All tracks are written by Daniel Johnston. All tracks produced by Johnston.

Side one
No.	Title	Length
1.	"Poor You"	2:03
2.	"Big Business Monkey"	2:02
3.	"Walking the Cow"	3:34
4.	"I Picture Myself with a Guitar"	0:45
5.	"Despair Came Knocking"	2:44
6.	"I Am a Baby (In My Universe)"	1:37
7.	"Nervous Love"	0:18
8.	"I'll Never Marry"	0:21
9.	"Get Yourself Together"	0:32
10.	"Running Water"	1:32
Total length:		15:28

Side two
No.	Title	Length
11.	"Desperate Man Blues"	3:40
12.	"Hey Joe"	2:44
13.	"She Called Pest Control"	0:53
14.	"Keep Punching Joe"	3:11
15.	"No More Pushing Joe Around"	4:42
Total length:		15:10

== Release history ==
Year	Label	Format	Region	Notes
1983	Self Released	Cassette	USA	
1986	Stress Records	Cassette	USA	
1988	Homestead Records	Cassette	USA	
1988	Homestead Records	LP / Cassette	USA	
1991	Homestead Records	CD	USA	Bonus tracks on Continued Story CD issue
2006	Eternal Yip Eye Music / High Wire Music	CD	USA	Bonus tracks on Continued Story CD issue
2007	Eternal Yip Eye Music	LP	USA	
2009	Eternal Yip Eye Music	CD	USA/Europe	Bonus tracks on Continued Story CD issue
2010	Eye Music	Cassette	USA	
2011	Eternal Yip Eye Music	Memory Stick	USA	
2012	Eye Music	Cassette	USA	
2017	Eternal Yip Eye Music	Cassette	USA	
2018	Feraltone	LP	USA	3xLP box set containing Hi How Are You and Yip/Jump Music
2019	Eternal Yip Eye Music	Cassette	USA	
