= Fear Yourself =

Studio album by Daniel Johnston
- Released: 2003
- Label: Gammon
- Producer: Mark Linkous

Daniel Johnston chronology
Rejected Unknown (2001)	Fear Yourself (2003)	Freak Brain (2005)

Fear Yourself is an album by the American musician Daniel Johnston, released in 2003. It was produced by Mark Linkous. The album included an 8-page booklet with exclusive Daniel Johnston drawings.

== Critical reception ==
The Independent wrote that the "fancy production ... works to a point, but, by the end, you find yourself preferring Johnston's usual eerie starkness." The Washington Post determined that "Johnston's pained, humble songs are eerie and sensuous, emotionally textured in a way that demands only amplification, and Linkous's vintage box of tricks suits the songs beautifully." The New York Times concluded that Linkous's contribution to the music "reveals the cracked, epic romances hidden within Mr. Johnston's singsong."

== Track listing ==
All tracks are written by Daniel Johnston.

No.	Title	Length
1.	"Now"	2:26
2.	"Syrup of Tears"	4:11
3.	"Mountain Top"	2:04
4.	"Love Enchanted"	3:45
5.	"Must"	4:08
6.	"Fish"	3:11
7.	"The Power of Love"	5:23
8.	"Forever Your Love"	4:50
9.	"Love Not Dead"	4:10
10.	"You Hurt Me"	4:24
11.	"Wish"	3:26
12.	"Living It for the Moment"	4:15

== Personnel ==
- Daniel Johnston - vocals, piano, acoustic guitar
- Mark Linkous - backing vocals, guitar, baritone guitar, synthesizer, Mellotron, Optigan, Orchestron, Theremin, laptop, glockenspiel, vibraphone, string arrangements, harp, timpani, cymbals, English horn, choir

Additional personnel

- Alan Weatherhead - recording engineer, guitar, baritone guitar, bass guitar, lap steel guitar, pedal steel guitar, Mellotron, Chamberlin, Orchestron, synthesizer, electric piano, celeste, vibraphone, French horn, string arrangements
- Miguel Urbiztondo - drums
- Melissa Moore - violin, bass guitar,
- Bob Rupe - bass guitar
- Jess Hofia - saw
