= Retired Boxer =

1984 album by Daniel Johnston

Studio album by Daniel Johnston
- Released: December 1984
- Recorded: December 1984
- Genre: Lo-fi
- Length: 30:05
- Label: Stress Records

Daniel Johnston chronology
Hi, How Are You (1983)	Retired Boxer (1984)	Respect (1985)

Retired Boxer is the seventh self-released music cassette album by singer-songwriter Daniel Johnston, recorded in 1984. The album's nine songs are performed in Johnston's usual confessional piano ballad style. This album, like those before it, was recorded with a consumer grade tape player. Evidence of this is found in the warbling tape hiss and distortion.

== Background ==
Retired Boxer was Johnston's first album recorded in Austin, Texas, a location where he found much success. During the recording of Hi, How Are You the previous year, Johnston was living with his sister Margie but disappeared in April 1984 after his mother suggested institutionalizing him. He only told his parents where he was on Fathers Day of that year. He had purchased a moped and rode it to the local carnival, where he began working at the Corn Dog Stand. Six months later, when the carnival arrived in Austin, Johnston had upset someone with how long he was taking on the porta-potty, which resulted in Johnston being punched. The assault left Johnston badly hurt, and he began searching for a nearby Church for help, before eventually arriving at the Austin University Church of Christ. The staff there took Johnston to a doctor and leased him an apartment. Whilst in Austin, Johnston also began working at McDonalds. His assault is referenced in the song "Bye-Bye Barbie", with the lyric "A knock in the skull sure changes a man".

Most of the album features Johnston playing the piano, save for the final track, "True Love Will Find You In The End", where he plays acoustic guitar. Johnston was influenced to start playing the guitar by the legacy of Austin-based guitar players.

=== Artwork / Title ===
The album's artwork features Johnston's character of Joe The Boxer, who was featured heavily in the lyrics to Hi, How Are You. The title came after Johnston got a concussion in a fight at the carnival. He had considered himself tough beforehand but realized he was not. As a result, he decided to name the album Retired Boxer.

== Promotion ==
As he had done with Hi, How Are You, Johnston began to give away copies of Retired Boxer to anyone he could. Since he was now living in Austin, these often ended up in the hands of influential figures in the local music scene, such as Louis Black of The Austin Chronicle, to whom Johnston also gave copies of Hi, How Are You and Yip/Jump Music. Black began playing the material for other music writers as well as musicians, whilst Johnston himself continued to hand out copies, inciting a local interest.

== Legacy ==
"True Love Will Find You in the End" has been covered by several artists, including Headless Heroes, Wilco, Beck, Richard Walters, Spectrum, Mates of State, Spiritualised, Steve Harley, The Legendary Tigerman with Cibelle, Elizabeth & the Catapult, A Whisper in the Noise, Svavar Knútur, Fritz Ostermayer, Kevin Blechdom, Noël Akchoté & Brad Jones, Milky Wimpshake & Tape Deck Mountain and Shakey Graves & Jess Williamson. Whilst some covers, like Jad Fair & Kramer's, Mathew Good's, Adrian Crowley & James Yorkston's and Kate Davis', retain the original two-minute structure of the song, it's more common for artists to expand upon the original either through a slower tempo or repeated sections.

Johnston's original "True Love Will Find You in the End" was used in a 2012 commercial for Axe men's hair care product.

As a benefit for the mental health charity Hi How Are You Project, American singer-bassist Kate Davis released her own re-recording of the album, titled Strange Boy, which was released on January 29, 2021, with "Oh No" acting as the album's lead single, released to SoundCloud in November 2020. Davis' appreciation for the album comes from the DIY aspects of it as well as its lyrical themes, saying Johnston's music was "complete, while leaving room for you to take it wherever you want it to go". Johnston's death, which took place during production of the album, was influential on her performance of it, in particular for the song "Too Young To Die", which was also dedicated to her deceased father.

== Track listing ==
All tracks are written by Daniel Johnston. All tracks produced by Johnston.

Side one
No.	Title	Length
1.	"I'll Do Anything but Break Dance for Ya, Darling"	6:02
2.	"Bye Bye Barbie"	1:18
3.	"Fighting with Myself"	2:28
4.	"Too Young to Die"	3:47
5.	"This Song"	1:19
Total length:		14:54

Side two
No.	Title	Length
6.	"Feels Good"	4:18
7.	"Oh No"	3:58
8.	"Strange Boy"	5:01
9.	"True Love Will Find You in the End"	1:54
Total length:		15:11

== Release history ==
Year	Label	Format	Notes
1984	Self Released	Cassette	
1987	Stress Records	Cassette	
2005	Eternal Yip Eye Music	CD	Also contains 'Respect'
2007	Eternal Yip Eye Music	CD	Also contains 'Respect'
2010	Eternal Yip Eye Music	Cassette	
