= Kathy McCarty =

Musician and painter

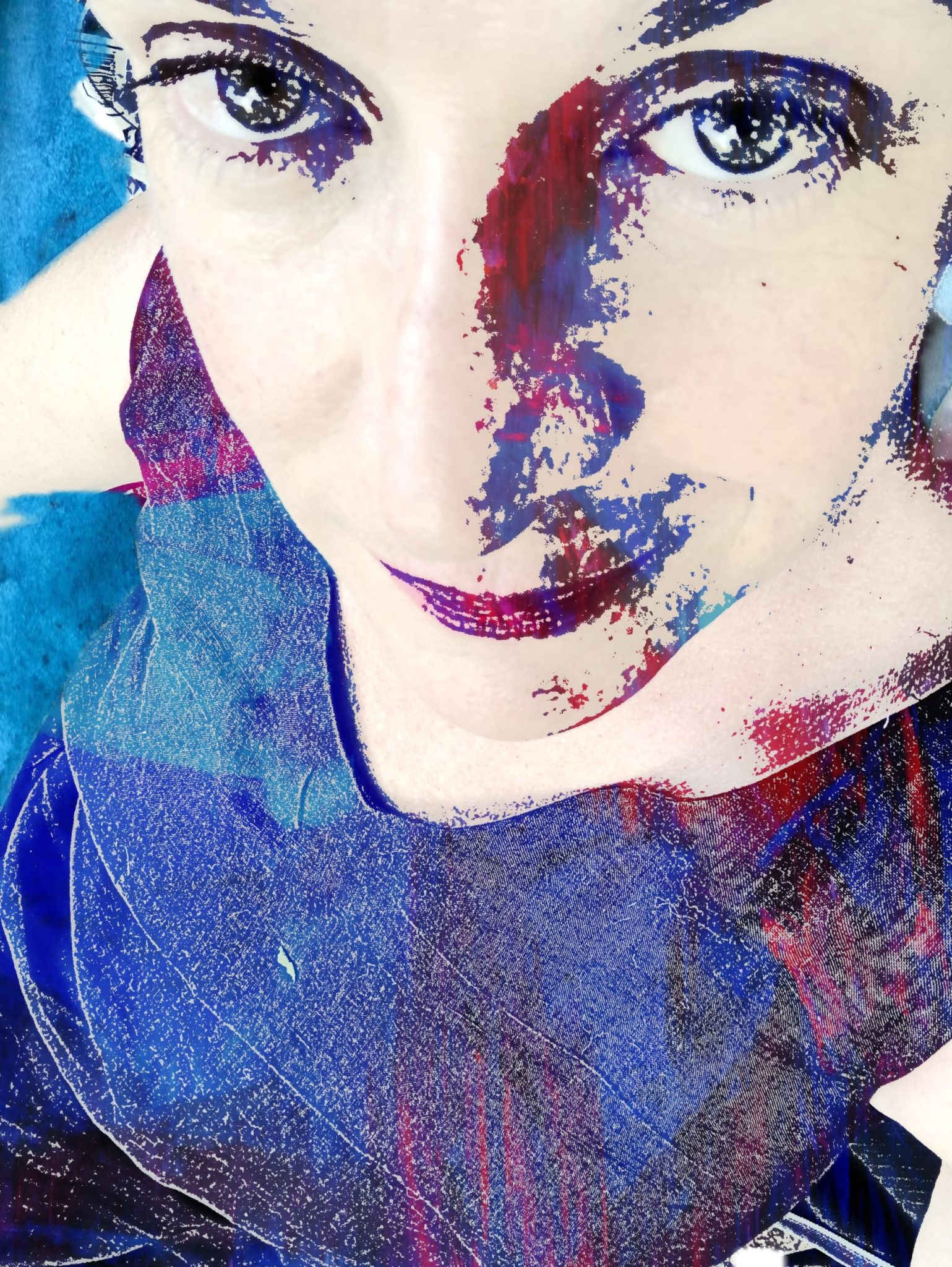

Background information
- Origin: Austin, Texas, U.S.
- Genres: Art rock
- Occupation: Singer
- Years active: 1981–present
- Website: thekathymccarty.com

Kathy McCarty is an Austin, Texas-based musician and painter.

== Career ==
After getting her start with the band Buffalo Gals (1981–1983), McCarty was a founding member and co-leader of the band Glass Eye. After Glass Eye disbanded in 1993, she turned her attention to recording an album of covers by songwriter Daniel Johnston. Dead Dog's Eyeball: Songs of Daniel Johnston was produced by former Glass Eye bandmate Brian Beattie. Trouser Press noted that "no songwriter ever had a more imaginative or beneficial interpreter than Daniel Johnston enjoys in Kathy McCarty". One of the songs of the album, Living Life, was included on the soundtrack of the movie Before Sunrise (1995).

Another Day in the Sun was a full-length follow-up to Dead Dog's Eyeball. It was also produced by Beattie. Texas Monthly wrote: "Some songs recall Glass Eye's art-rock explosives... and McCarty's lyrical acuity remains intact... But there's an open, folkish quality too... that lends her work uncommon depth and staying power".

In 2020, McCarty played a variety of curated shows including the occasional Johnston tribute and recorded new material. In February 2020, she traveled to Los Angeles to sing "Younger Generation" for a tribute/benefit show at the reunion of the Lovin' Spoonful.

McCarty's cover of Johnston's song "Rocketship" was featured in the animated TV show Futurama and in the 2022 Richard Linklater film Apollo 10 1/2: A Space Age Childhood.

== Discography ==
=== With Glass Eye ===
Albums

- Huge (Wrestler Records, 1986)
- Bent by Nature (Bar/None Records, 1988)
- Hello Young Lovers (Bar/None Records, 1989)
- Every Woman's Fantasy (Glass Eye Records, 2006)

EPs/singles

- Marlo EP (Self-released, 1985)
- Christine EP (Bar/None Records, 1989)
- "Satellite of Love"/"Rock of Hand" single (1991) (Bar/None Records, 1991)

=== As a solo artist ===
Albums

- Dead Dog's Eyeball: Songs of Daniel Johnston (Bar/None Records, 1994)
- Another Day in the Sun (RexyRex Records, 2005)

Videos

- "Rocketship" (1995) - Daniel Johnston cover
