= Kent State University at East Liverpool =

Satellite campus of Kent State University, Ohio, U.S.

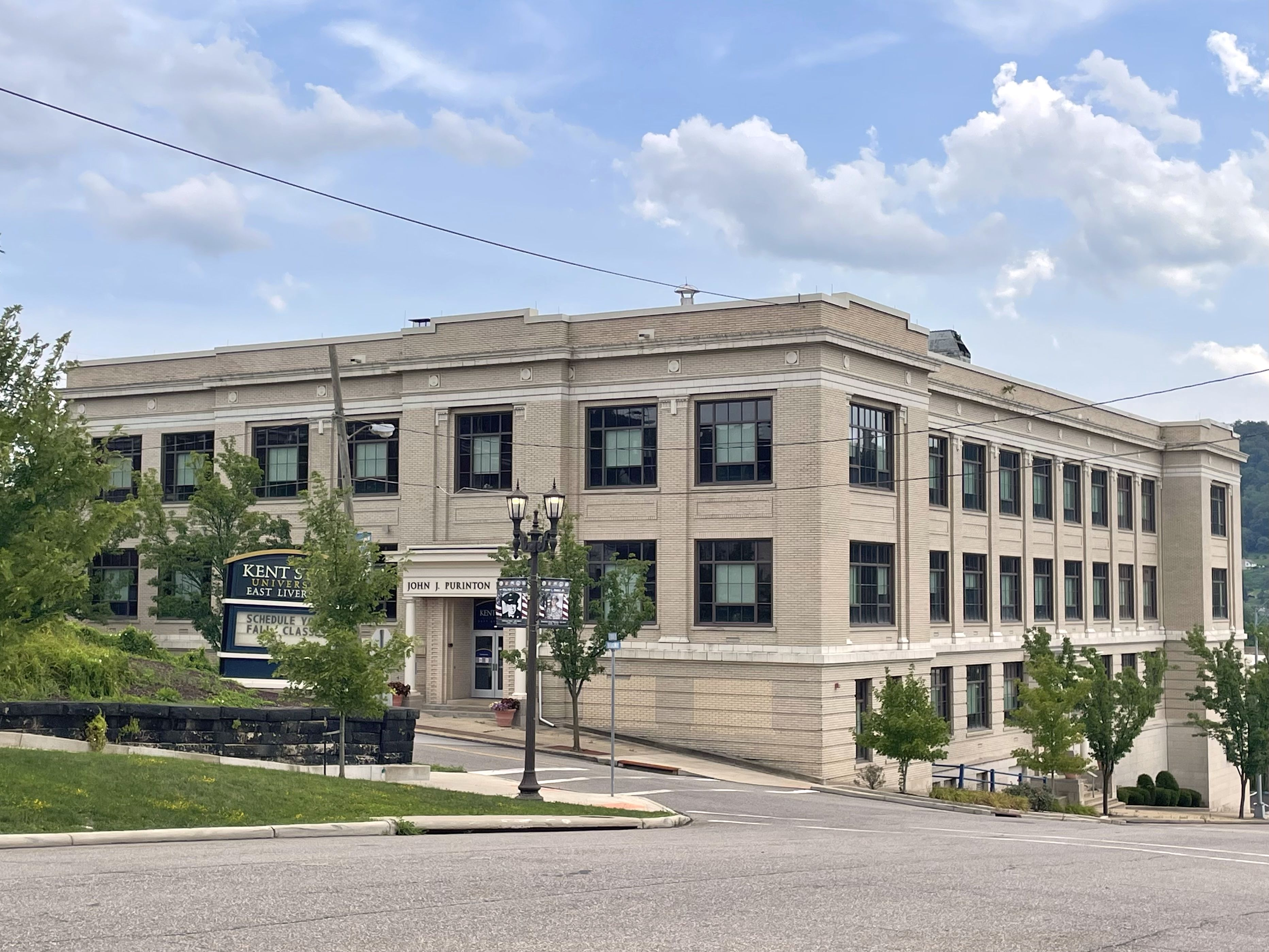
- Type: Public satellite campus
- Established: 1965; 61 years ago
- Parent institution: Kent State University
- Dean: Bradley A. Bielski
- Faculty: 25
- Administrative staff: 37
- Students: 462 (fall 2021)
- Location: East Liverpool, Ohio, United States; 40°37′01″N 80°34′35″W
- Campus: Suburban
- Website: www.kent.edu/columbiana

Kent State University at East Liverpool (Kent State East Liverpool) is a satellite campus of Kent State University in East Liverpool, Ohio, United States. Administered with Kent State University at Salem, Kent State East Liverpool offers bachelor's and associate degrees. The campus consists of two buildings in downtown East Liverpool; John J. Purinton Hall and the Mary Patterson Building. As of 2021, enrollment at Kent State East Liverpool was 462 with total enrollment for the Columbiana Campuses at over 1,400.

== History ==
Kent State East Liverpool was established in 1965 as an academic outreach of Kent State located in the International Brotherhood of Operative Potters building. It moved to its present location in 1968, purchasing the former East Liverpool High School downtown campus from the East Liverpool City School District. In the same year, the school was officially established as a Kent State University regional branch. In 2009, East Liverpool Campus and Kent State's Salem Campus merged administrators and faculty to become Kent State University Columbiana Campus, with both branches remaining in their respective locations.

== Academics ==
Like other Kent State regional campuses, students at Kent State Kent State East Liverpool can begin coursework for any of the undergraduate majors available at Kent State. Between the downtown campus and the Salem campus, more than 20 degrees are offered, including 12 bachelor's degrees. Tuition is also lower than at the main campus in Kent for in-state, lower division classes. Out-of-state tuition for residents in select counties in West Virginia and Pennsylvania was reduced in the spring of 2010. Residents must reside in either Brooke, Hancock or Ohio counties in West Virginia, or, Allegheny, Beaver, Butler, Crawford, Erie, Lawrence or Mercer county in Western Pennsylvania.

== Notable alumni ==
- Daniel Johnston – artist, singer and songwriter
