= The Devil and Daniel Johnston =

2005 American documentary film

- A promotional poster for the film
- Directed by: Jeff Feuerzeig
- Produced by: Henry S. Rosenthal
- Starring: Daniel Johnston
- Cinematography: Fortunato Procopio
- Edited by: Tyler Hubby
- Music by: Daniel Johnston
- Distributed by: Sony Pictures Classics
- Release dates: January 2005 (Sundance); March 31, 2006 (United States)
- Running time: 110 minutes
- Country: United States
- Language: English
- Box office: $453,337

The Devil and Daniel Johnston is a 2005 documentary film about American musician Daniel Johnston (1961–2019).

== Summary ==
The film chronicles Johnston's life from childhood up to age 45, with an emphasis on his experiences with bipolar disorder, and how it manifested itself in demonic self-obsession. The film was directed by Jeff Feuerzeig and produced by Henry S. Rosenthal.

== Reception ==
=== Critical reception ===
On Rotten Tomatoes the film has an approval rating of 88% based on 110 reviews. The website's critics consensus reads, "Whether you think this mentally ill cult musician is worthy of being called a 'genius,' this document of his life is crafted with sincere respect and is fascinating to watch." On Metacritic the film has a score of 77 out of 100, based on reviews from 33 critics.

=== Awards ===
The film won the Documentary Directing Award at the 2005 Sundance Film Festival.

== Home media ==
It is available on DVD from Sony Pictures Home Entertainment, which includes a supplemental feature documenting the reunion between Johnston and his long-time obsession and muse, Laurie Allen. A manufacture on demand Blu-ray was released through Sony's Choice Collection on October 19, 2016.
