= Daniel Johnston =

American musician (1961–2019)

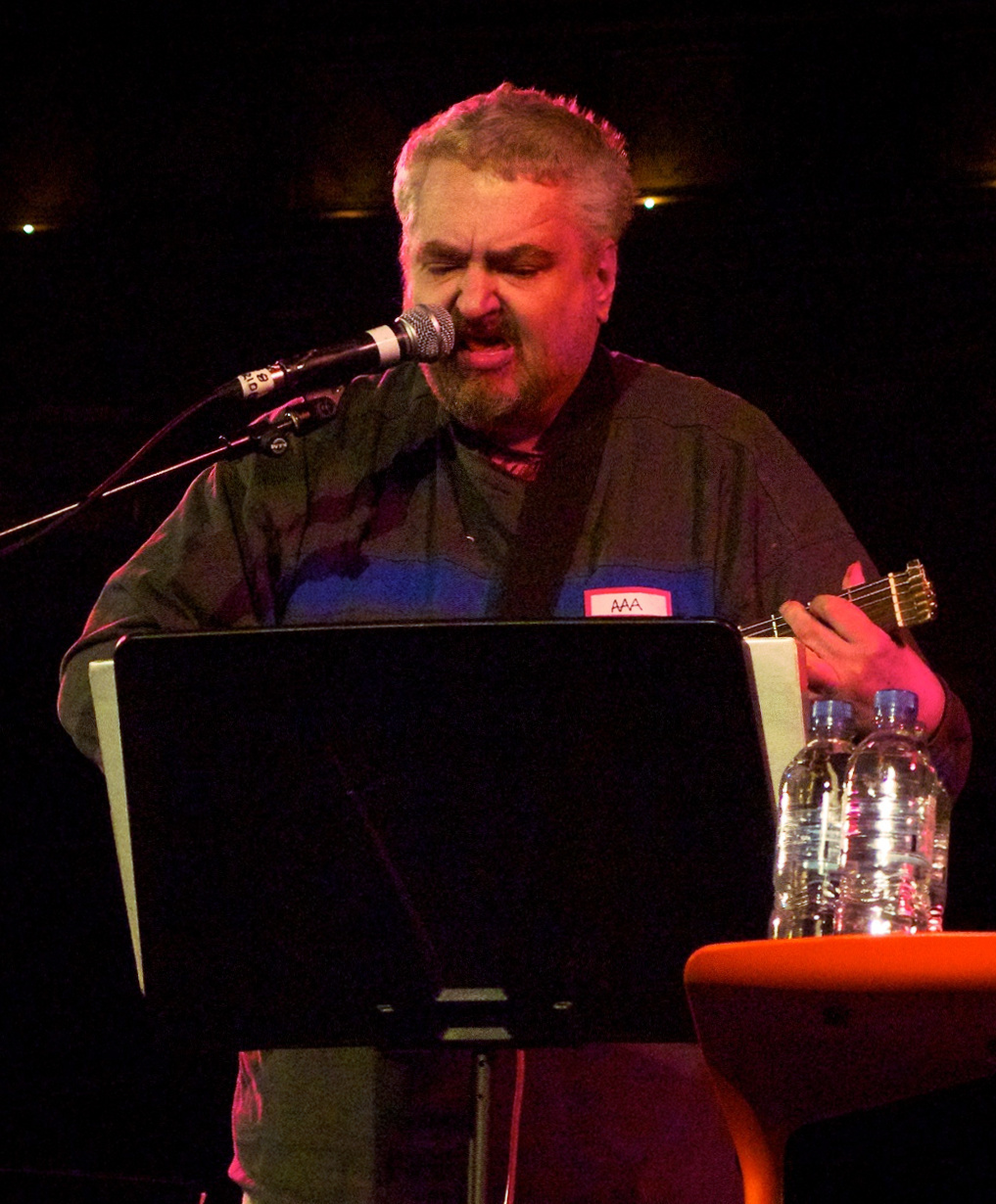
- Johnston performing in 2012

Background information
- Born: Daniel Dale Johnston; January 22, 1961; Sacramento, California, U.S.
- Died: c. September 11, 2019 (aged 58) Waller, Texas, U.S.
- Genres: Outsider; lo-fi; indie folk; avant-pop
- Occupations: Musician; singer-songwriter; visual artist
- Instruments: Vocals; piano; keyboards; chord organ; guitar; drums
- Years active: 1978–2019
- Labels: Yip Eye Music; Atlantic; Stress Records
- Website: hihowareyou.com

Daniel Dale Johnston (January 22, 1961 – c. September 11, 2019) was an American singer, musician and artist regarded as a significant figure in outsider, lo-fi, and alternative music scenes. Most of his work consisted of cassettes recorded alone in his home, and his music was frequently cited for its "pure" and "childlike" qualities.

Johnston spent extended periods in psychiatric institutions and was diagnosed with bipolar disorder. He garnered a local following in the 1980s by passing out tapes of his music while working at a McDonald's in the Dobie Center in Austin, Texas. His cult status was propelled when Nirvana's Kurt Cobain was seen wearing a T-shirt that featured the artpiece "Jeremiah the Innocent" from Johnston's 1983 cassette album Hi, How Are You.

Johnston also created visual art, and his illustrations were exhibited at galleries around the world. His struggles with mental illness were the subject of the 2005 documentary The Devil and Daniel Johnston. He died in 2019 of a suspected heart attack.

== Early life ==
Johnston was born in Sacramento, California, and grew up in New Cumberland, West Virginia. He was the youngest of five children of William Dale "Bill" Johnston (1922–2017) and Mabel Ruth Voyles Johnston (1923–2010). He began recording music in the late 1970s on a $59 Sanyo monaural boombox, singing and playing piano as well as the chord organ.

As a teenager, Johnston suffered from clinical depression, and at 20 years old was diagnosed with bipolar disorder with psychotic features. During manic or psychotic episodes, he would have delusions that he or others were possessed by Satan, and that The Beast was after him.

Following graduation from Oak Glen High School, Johnston spent a few weeks at Abilene Christian University in West Texas before dropping out. He later attended the art program at Kent State University, East Liverpool, during which he recorded Songs of Pain and More Songs of Pain. At the latter school, he befriended classmate Laurie Allen, and he wrote nearly 100 love songs about her; he considered her his muse, even though she did not return his romantic feelings. When she got engaged and moved to Houston, Texas in 1982, Johnston fell into a deep depression, dropped out of school, and moved in with his brother, Dick.

While living in his brother's garage, he recorded another tape, Yip/Jump Music. Dick evicted his brother after he had an argument with Dick's wife. Johnston moved to San Marcos, Texas to live with his sister, Margie, and recorded Hi, How Are You.

== Career ==
=== 1980s–1990s ===
In 1984, Johnston took a job at McDonald's and passed out tapes in the store. Later, Johnston moved to Austin, Texas with a traveling carnival, working at a corn dog stand. He began to attract the attention of the local press and gained a following by handing out tapes to people he met. Live performances were well-attended and hotly anticipated.

His local standing led to him being featured in a 1985 episode of the MTV program The Cutting Edge featuring performers from Austin's "new sincerity" music scene.

In 1988, Johnston visited New York City and recorded 1990 with producer Mark Kramer at his Noise New York studio. It was Johnston's first professional recording following a decade of releasing home-made cassette recordings. His mental health deteriorated during the making of 1990. In 1989, he released the album It's Spooky in collaboration with singer Jad Fair of the band Half Japanese.

In 1990, Johnston played at a music festival in Austin, Texas. On the way back to West Virginia on a private two-seater plane piloted by his father Bill, Johnston had a manic psychotic episode; believing he was Casper the Friendly Ghost, Johnston removed the key from the plane's ignition and threw it outside. His father, a former U.S. Air Force pilot, managed to successfully crash-land the plane, even though "there was nothing down there but trees". Although the plane was destroyed, Johnston and his father emerged with only minor injuries. As a result of this episode, Johnston was involuntarily committed to a mental hospital.

Interest in Johnston increased when Kurt Cobain of Nirvana was frequently photographed wearing a T-shirt featuring the cover image of Johnston's album Hi, How Are You that music journalist Everett True had given to him. Cobain listed Yip/Jump Music as one of his favorite albums in his journal, in 1993.

Johnston's profile was further raised by Kathy McCarty's 1994 album Dead Dog's Eyeball: Songs of Daniel Johnston. It contained 19 renditions of songs written by Johnston. McCarty became aware of Johnston when he gave her one of his cassette tapes after a performance of her band, Glass Eye, in 1985; this led to him later opening for the band. McCarty supported the album with a North American tour, and also issued an EP of additional Johnston material, Sorry Entertainer in 1995.

Despite Johnston having been a resident in a mental hospital at the time, there was a bidding war to sign him. He refused to sign a multi-album deal with Elektra Records because Metallica was on the label's roster and he was convinced that they were Satanic and would hurt him, also dropping his longtime manager, Jeff Tartakov, in the process. Ultimately he signed with new manager Tom Gimbel, who subsequently negotiated a deal with Atlantic Records in February 1994 and that September released Fun, produced by Paul Leary of Butthole Surfers. That same year, Danny Goldberg, who had championed the signing of Johnston, left Atlantic; in June 1996, with Goldberg no longer making A&R decisions, Atlantic dropped Johnston from the label.

In 1993, the Sound Exchange record store in Austin, Texas commissioned Johnston to paint a mural of the Hi, How Are You? frog (also known as "Jeremiah the Innocent") from the album's cover. After the record store closed in 2003, the building remained unoccupied until 2004, when the Mexican grill franchise Baja Fresh took ownership and decided they would remove the wall that held the mural. A group of people who lived in the neighborhood convinced the managers and contractors to keep the mural intact. In 2018, the building housed a Thai restaurant called Thai, How Are You; the restaurant closed permanently in January 2020. In April 2023 the building was razed, but the wall with the mural was left standing. The owner said there were no current plans for development, but that the wall would be integrated into any future designs.

=== 2000s ===
In 2004, Johnston released The Late Great Daniel Johnston: Discovered Covered, a two-disc compilation. The first disc featured covers of his songs by artists including Tom Waits, Beck, TV on the Radio, Jad Fair, Eels, Bright Eyes, Calvin Johnson, Death Cab for Cutie, Sparklehorse, Mercury Rev, The Flaming Lips and Starlight Mints, with the second disc featuring Johnston's original recordings of the songs. In 2005, Texas-based theater company Infernal Bridegroom Productions received a Multi-Arts Production/MAP Fund grant to work with Johnston to create a rock opera based on his music, titled Speeding Motorcycle.

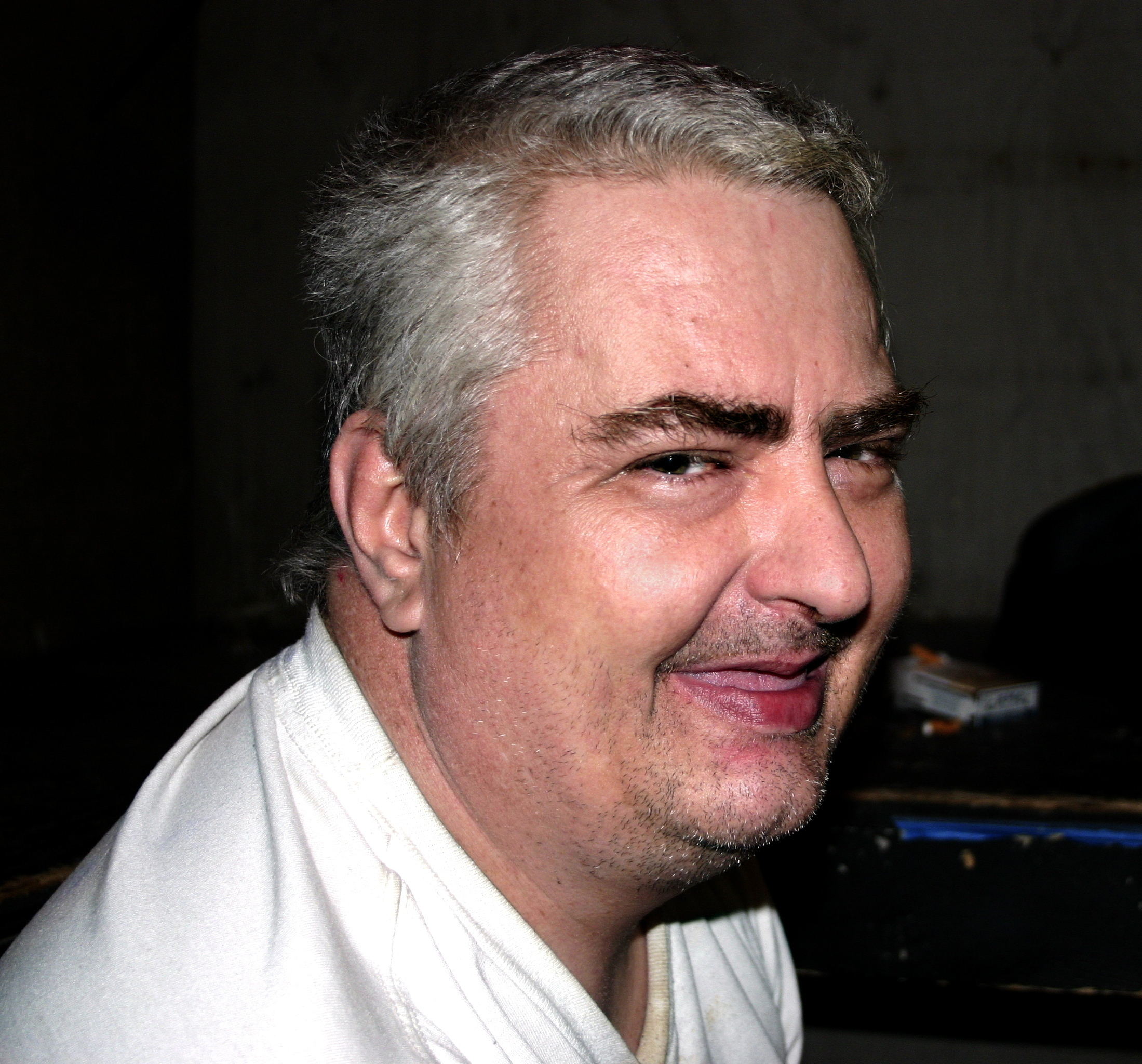
Johnston in 2006

In 2006, Jeff Feuerzeig released a documentary about Johnston, The Devil and Daniel Johnston; the film, four years in the making, collated some of the vast amount of recorded material Johnston (and in some case, others) had produced over the years to portray his life and music. The film won high praise, receiving the Director's Award at the 2005 Sundance Film Festival. The film also inspired more interest in Johnston's work, and increased his prestige as a touring artist. In 2006, Johnston's label, Eternal Yip Eye Music, released his first greatest-hits compilation, Welcome to My World.

Through the next few years, Johnston toured extensively across the world and continued to attract press attention. His artwork was shown in galleries such as in London's Aquarium Gallery, New York City's Clementine Gallery and at the Liverpool Biennial in 2006 and 2008, and in 2009, his work was exhibited at "The Museum of Love" at Verge Gallery in Sacramento, California. In 2008, Dick Johnston, Johnston's brother and manager, revealed that "a movie deal based on the artist's life and music had been finalized with a tentative 2011 release". He also said that a deal had been struck with Converse for a "signature series" Daniel Johnston shoe. Later, it was revealed by Dick Johnston that Converse had dropped the plan. In early 2008, a Jeremiah the Innocent collectible figurine was released in limited runs of four different colors. Later in the year, Adjustable Productions released Johnston's first concert DVD, The Angel and Daniel Johnston – Live at the Union Chapel, featuring a 2007 appearance in Islington, London.

Is and Always Was was released on October 6, 2009, on Eternal Yip Eye Music. In 2009, it was announced that Matt Groening had chosen Johnston to perform at the edition of the All Tomorrow's Parties festival that he curated in May 2010, in Minehead, England. Also that year, Dr. Fun Fun and Smashing Studios developed an iPhone platform game called Hi, How Are You. The game is similar to Frogger, but features Johnston's art and music. Johnston played it during its development and liked it, although he was not familiar with the iPhone.

=== 2010s ===
On March 13, 2012, Johnston released his first comic book Space Ducks – An Infinite Comic Book of Musical Greatness at SXSW festival, published by BOOM! Studios. The comic book ties-in with the Space Ducks album and an iOS app. Johnston collaborated with skateboarding and clothing brand Supreme on numerous collections, consisting of clothing and various accessories, showcasing his artwork.

On March 1, 2012, Brooklyn-based photographer Jung Kim announced her photo book and traveling exhibition project with Johnston titled DANIEL JOHNSTON: here, a collaboration that began in 2008 when Kim first met Johnston and began photographing him on the road and at his home in Waller, Texas. On March 13, 2013, this photography book was published, featuring five years of documentation on Johnston. The opening exhibition at SXSW festival featured a special performance by Johnston along with tribute performances led by Jason Sebastian Russo formerly of Mercury Rev. The second exhibition ran in May and June 2013 in London, England, and featured a special performance by Johnston along with tribute performances by British band Charlie Boyer and the Voyeurs with Steffan Halperin of Klaxons. On October 10, 2013, Jason Pierce of Spiritualized hosted the New York City opening of the exhibition, which included special tribute performances led by Pierce and Glen Hansard of The Swell Season and The Frames.

In November 2015, Hi, How Are You Daniel Johnston?, a short documentary about Johnston's life, was released featuring Johnston as his 2015 self and Gabriel Sunday of Archie's Final Project as Johnston's 1983 self. The executive producers for the film included Lana Del Rey and Mac Miller.

In the fall of 2017, Johnston embarked on what he announced would be his final tour, playing twelve concerts. Each stop on the tour featured Johnston backed by a group that had been influenced by his music: The Preservation All-Stars in New Orleans; The Districts and Modern Baseball in Washington, D.C., and Philadelphia; Beirut, Invisible Familiars, and others in New York City; Jeff Tweedy at two shows in Chicago; Mike Watt, Ben Lee, Maria Taylor, and members of Silversun Pickups in Los Angeles and San Francisco; and Built to Spill for the final four dates in Boise, Portland, Vancouver, and Seattle. In 2020, Wilco's label released Chicago 2017, which included nine tracks recorded live at The Vic Theatre with Tweedy and his band, as well as five tracks pulled from a studio session the day before. Proceeds from the record benefited the "Hi, How Are You Project", a non-profit organisation started with the support of Daniel and his family.

== Death ==
On September 11, 2019, Johnston was found dead from a suspected heart attack at his home in Waller, Texas. It is believed that he died during the previous night, a day after he had been discharged from hospital after unspecified kidney problems.

Daniel Johnston is buried at Magnolia Cemetery in Katy, Texas.

== Discography ==
Studio albums

- Songs of Pain (1981)
- Don't Be Scared (1982)
- The What of Whom (1982)
- More Songs of Pain (1983)
- Yip/Jump Music (1983)
- Hi, How Are You (1983)
- Retired Boxer (1984)
- Respect (1985)
- Continued Story with Texas Instruments (1985) (with Texas Instruments)
- Merry Christmas (1988)
- It's Spooky (1989) (with Jad Fair)
- 1990 (1990)
- Artistic Vice (1991)
- Fun (1994)
- Rejected Unknown (2001)
- The Lucky Sperms: Somewhat Humorous (2001) (with Jad Fair)
- Fear Yourself (2003)
- Lost and Found (2006)
- Is and Always Was (2009)
- Beam Me Up! (2010) (with Beam)
- Space Ducks (2012)
