= Hi, How Are You Daniel Johnston? =

- Directed by: Gabriel Sunday
- Written by: Daniel Johnston; David Lee Miller; Gabriel Sunday
- Produced by: Matt Roznovak; Erica Sterne; Ben Spiegelman; Gabriel Sunday
- Starring: Daniel Johnston; Greg McLeod; Myles McLeod; Soko; Gabriel Sunday
- Cinematography: Timothy A. Burton
- Edited by: Sneer; Gabriel Sunday
- Music by: Jesse Adams
- Release date: November 7, 2015 (MAMA Art Gallery)
- Running time: 15 minutes
- Country: USA
- Language: English

Hi, How Are You Daniel Johnston? is a 2015 American short documentary film about musician Daniel Johnston. The film was directed by Gabriel Sunday and executive produced by Lana Del Rey and Mac Miller. It premiered in Los Angeles at the Mama Gallery in November 2015.

== Background and development ==
According to Billboard, the film took eight years to develop. The magazine described the motive of the film "to bring the audience inside the artist's schizophrenic head with that location acting as a cage-like home for his creative processes." The film was funded through a crowd-funding campaign on Kickstarter, with rapper Mac Miller and singer-songwriter Lana Del Rey both contributing funds to it. The duo were credited as executive producers for the film due to their $10,000 contributions. Del Rey would end up becoming more closely involved, recording a song for the soundtrack, a cover of Johnston's "Some Things Last a Long Time". The song was used in the soundtrack for the film.

The film's title derives from Johnston's self-proclaimed "unfinished album" from 1983, Hi, How Are You.

== Cast ==
- Daniel Johnston as himself
- Greg McLeod as 1983 Jeremiah The Innocent (voice)
- Myles McLeod as 2015 Jeremiah The Innocent (voice)
- Soko as Dream Laurie
- Gabriel Sunday as 1983 Daniel Johnston

== Promotion and release ==
The film premiered at the Mama Gallery in Los Angeles on November 7, 2015. The film premiered on the internet on November 11 and went on a film festival run in 2016, gaining the Bohemian Rhapsody Award for Sunday at the Sydney Underground Film Festival and an Honorable Mention as an Anarchy Short at the Slamdance Film Festival

The film's credits cite Lana Del Rey, Larry Janss, Daniel Johnston, Dick Johnston, David Lee Miller, Mac Miller, and Barrie-James O'Neill as executive producers, with Sarah Rivka, Matt Roznovak, Tomas Seidita, Ben Speigelman, Erica Sterne, Jason Suhrke, and Gabriel Sunday as producers.
