= 1st Odesa International Film Festival =

2010 film festival in Ukraine

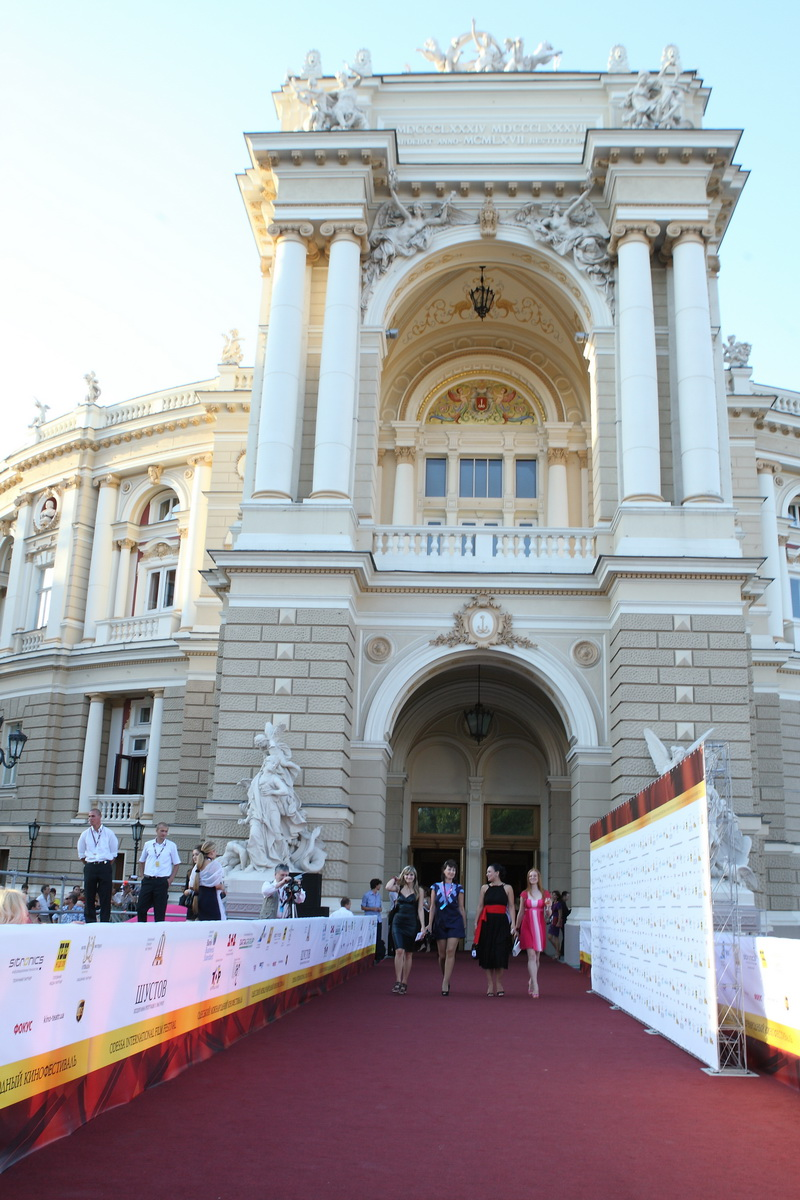
- Opening film: "Heartbreaker" / "L'arnacoeur" (Dir. Pascal Chaumeil), France
- Closing film: "A Man at the Window" (Dir.Dmitriy Meskhiev), Russia
- Location: Odesa, Ukraine
- Founded: 2010
- Awards: Grand Prix "The Golden Duke" – "Minors under 16..." (Dir. Anrey Cavun), Russia
- No. of films: 16 (in Competition), 57 (under competition)
- Festival date: 16-24 July 2010
- Website: http://www.oiff.com.ua

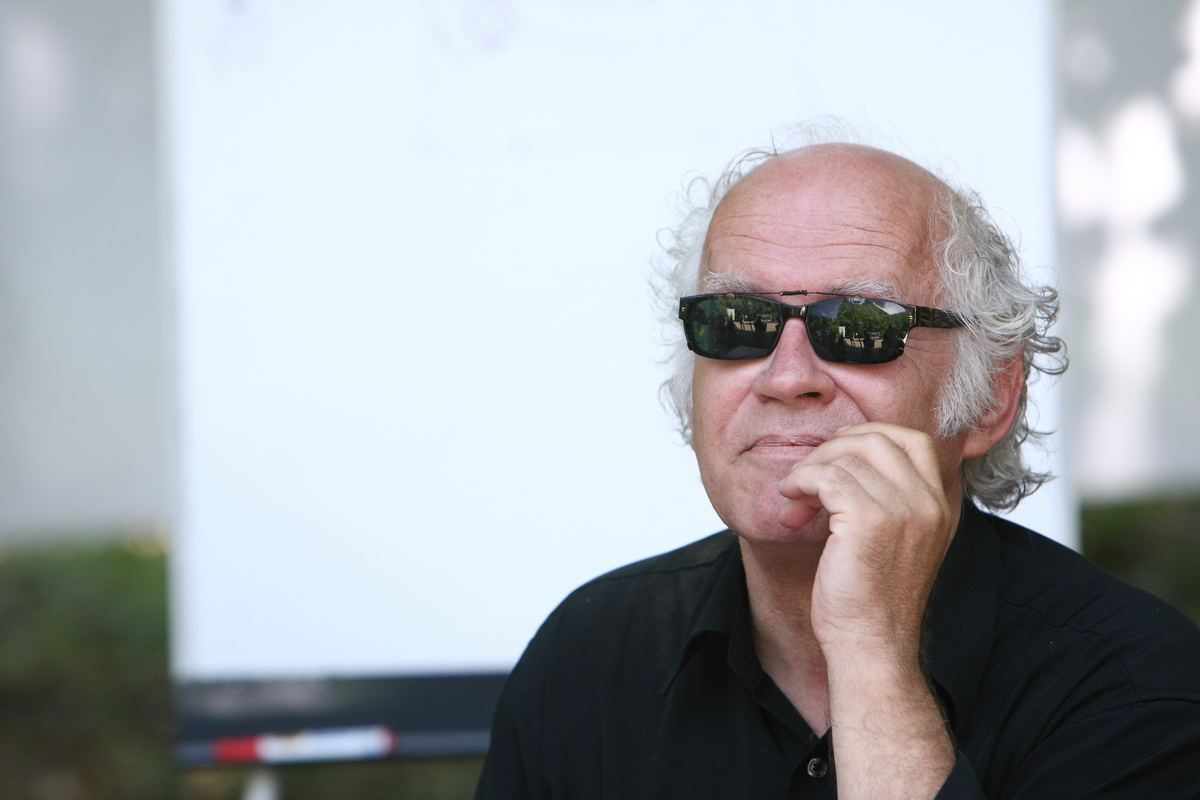
Dutch film maker Jos Stelling, president of the jury 1st Odesa Film Festival

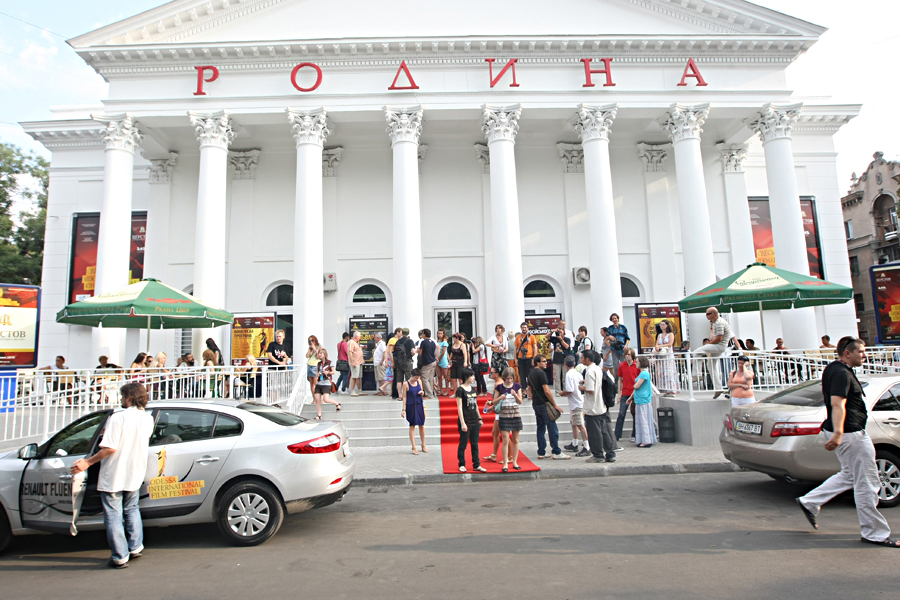
Odesa International Film Festival

The First Odesa International Film Festival (Ukrainian: Оде́ський міжнаро́дний кінофестива́ль) was held in Odesa (Ukraine) from 16 to 24 July 2010.

Screenings included in the competition program consisted of 16 feature-length films from United States, France, the Netherlands, Spain, Italy, Ukraine, Poland, Japan, Germany, Peru, Russia, India, United Kingdom, Canada (premiering in 2010) and the non-competition program consisted of over 50 films.

The international jury of the first festival was headed by Dutch film maker Jos Stelling.

Guests of the festival included Hollywood actor Rutger Hauer, directors Vadim Perelman, Krzysztof Zanussi, Kira Muratova, Yuri Mamin; actors Grégoire Colin, Vladimir Mashkov, Emmanuil Vitorgan, Alika Smekhova, Larisa Udovichenko, Yuriy Stoyanov, Sergei Migitsko, and others.

Screenings are held at five city movie theaters. The opening and closing ceremonies are hosted at the famed Odesa Opera House. The central platform for screenings, special events, and the home of festival headquarters is the "Rodina" Movie Theater. The Odesa Film Studio serves as the home-base of master classes (in the framework of the Summer Film School project) for the duration of the festival. The first festival was attended by over 40 thousand audience members.

After days full of screenings, the participants enjoy evening parties on the seashore beach clubs.

== Jury ==
The International Jury Odesa Film Festival 2010:

Jos Stelling – president of the jury, director, Netherlands

Swetlana Sikora – art-director of Film Festival goEAST, Germany

Grégoire Colin – actor, France

Sergey Chliyants – producer, Russia

Serhiy Trymbach – Ukraine

== Competitive program ==
Competition program Odesa IFF 2010

- Foot of God / Pide di Dio (Dir. Luigi Sardiello, Italy).
- Gordos (Dir. Daniel Sanchez Arevalo, Spain).
- Mammuth (Dir. Gustave de Kervern, Benoît Delépine, France).
- My Suicide (Dir. David Lee Miller, US).
- The Hairdresser / Die Friseuse (Dir. Doris Dörrie, Germany).
- October / Octubre (Dir. Daniel Vega Vidal and Diego Vega Vidal, Peru.Spain).
- Rubber (Dir. Quentin Dupieux, France, US).
- Saint John of Las Vegas (Dir. Hue Rhodes, US).
- Year of the Carnivore (Dir. Sook-Yin Lee, Canada).
- Stradivari Gun / Pistolet Stradivari (Dir. Oleksiy Lukanyоv, Ukraine, Russia).
- Road, Movie (Dir. Dev Benegal, US, India).
- Symbol / Shinboru (Dir. Hitoshi Matsumoto, Japan).
- Minors under 16 / Detiam do 16... (Dir. Andrey Kavun, Russia).
- Lullaby / Kolysanka (Dir. Juliusz Machulski, Poland).
- Cakeman / Taartman (Dir. Annemari van de Mond, Netherlands).
- Skeletons (Dir. Nick Whitfield, UK).

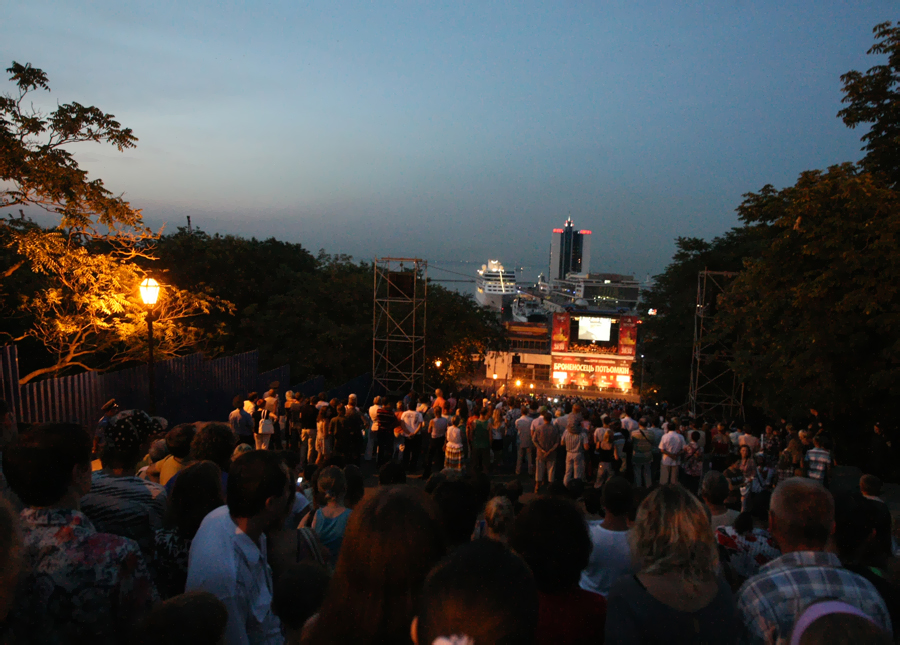
Odesa International Film Festival

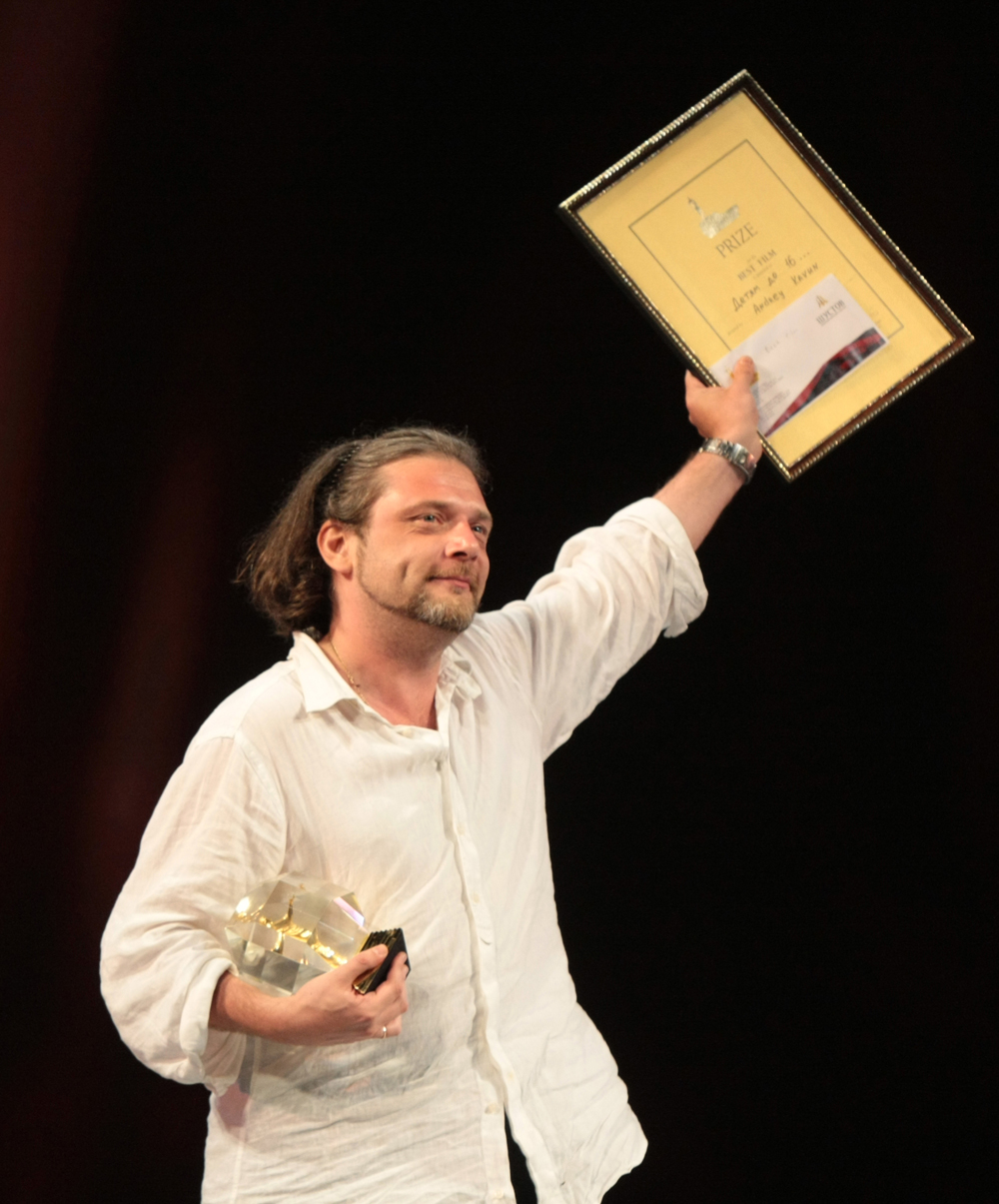
Andrey Kavun- Winner of the 1st OIFF

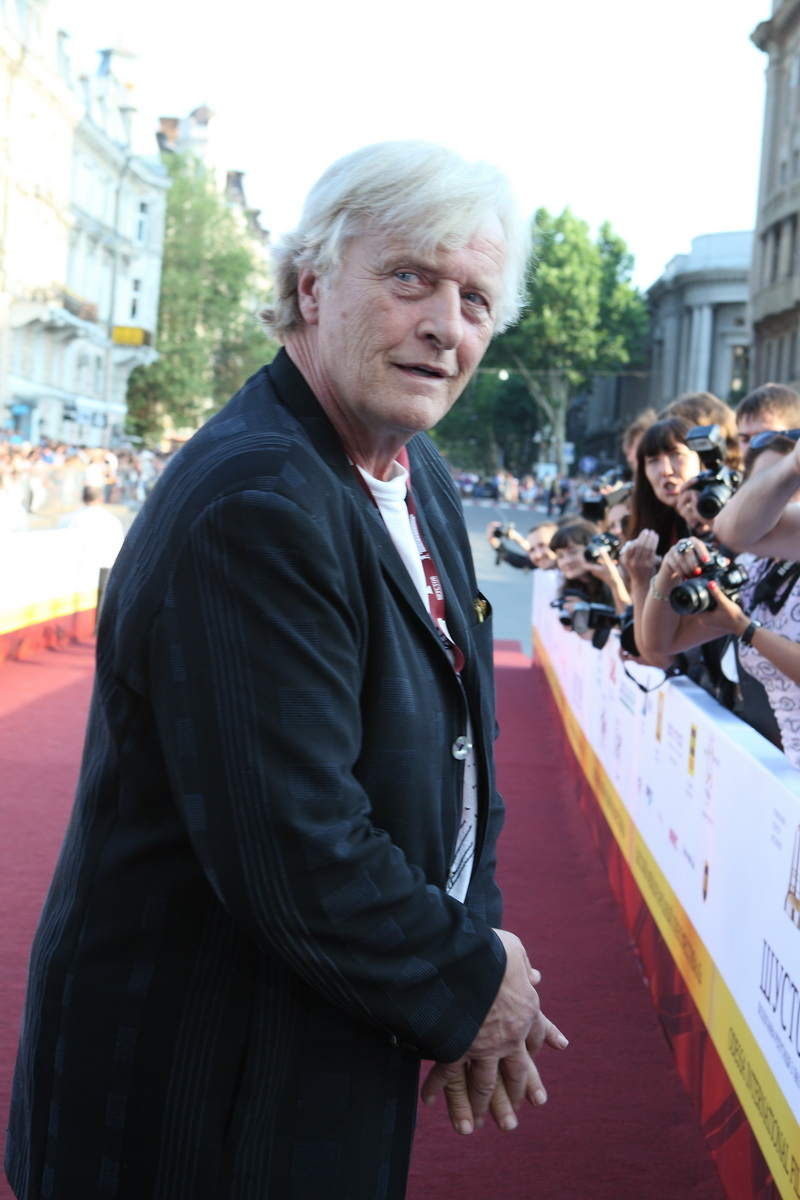
Rutger Hauer at the 1st Odesa International Film Festival

== Non-competitive program ==
A program entitled "Festival of Festivals" made up the non-competitive portion of the festival. This lineup included special screenings, retrospectives of famed filmmakers – Federico Fellini and Kira Muratova, a retrospective of the best comedies of the Odesa Film Studio, and special French and Russian programs.

== Special screenings ==
A unique and grandiose affair of the festival became the screening of Sergei M. Eisenstein's masterpiece "Battleship Potemkin" shown in the open air on the Potemkin Steps with live musical accompaniment by a symphonic orchestra.

== Summer Film School ==
The festival also included the special project – Summer Film School which incorporated Master Classes with special guests of the festival.

In the course of the 1st Odesa Film Festival, master classes were given by Hollywood actor Rutger Hauer; directors Krzysztof Zanussi, Vadim Perelman, Kira Muratova, Jos Stelling and Yuri Mamin; film connoisseur Naum Kleiman; writer Lubko Deresh; producer Sergey Chiliants and others.

== Winners ==
Winners of the 1st Odesa International Film Festival-2010

On 24 July 2010, at the closing ceremony in the Opera House, the jury announced the winners of the 1st Odesa International Film Festival:

Grand Prix of the Festival – Best film – "Minors under 16... ", directed by Andrey Kavun (Russia).

Best director – Juliusz Machulski, author of the film "Lullaby " (Poland).

Best acting work – Jaap Spijkers, the leading actor in the movie "Cakeman", directed by Annemari van de Mond (Netherlands).

Special Jury Award – the film "My Suicide", directed by David Lee Miller (US).

Special Jury Award – the film "October", directed by Daniel and Diego Vega (Peru, Spain).

Audience's Award – the film "Minors under 16... ", directed by Andrey Kavun (Russia).

== Gallery ==
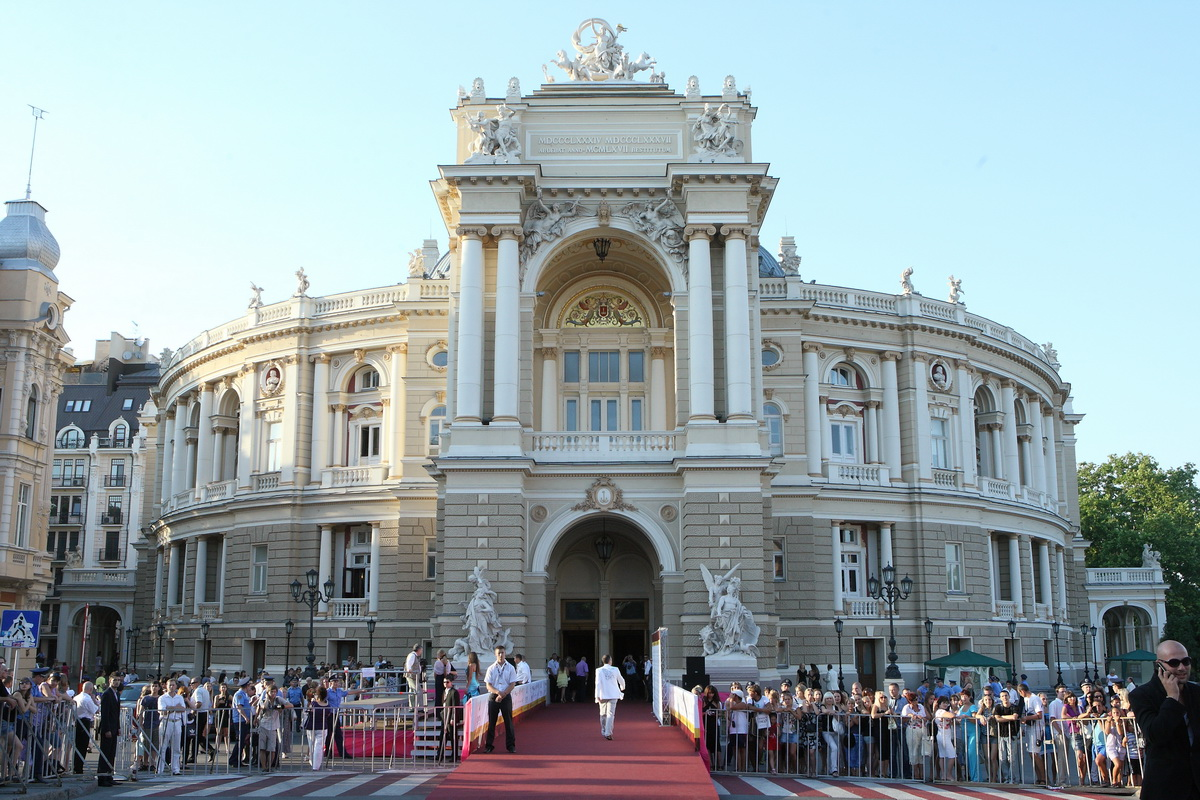

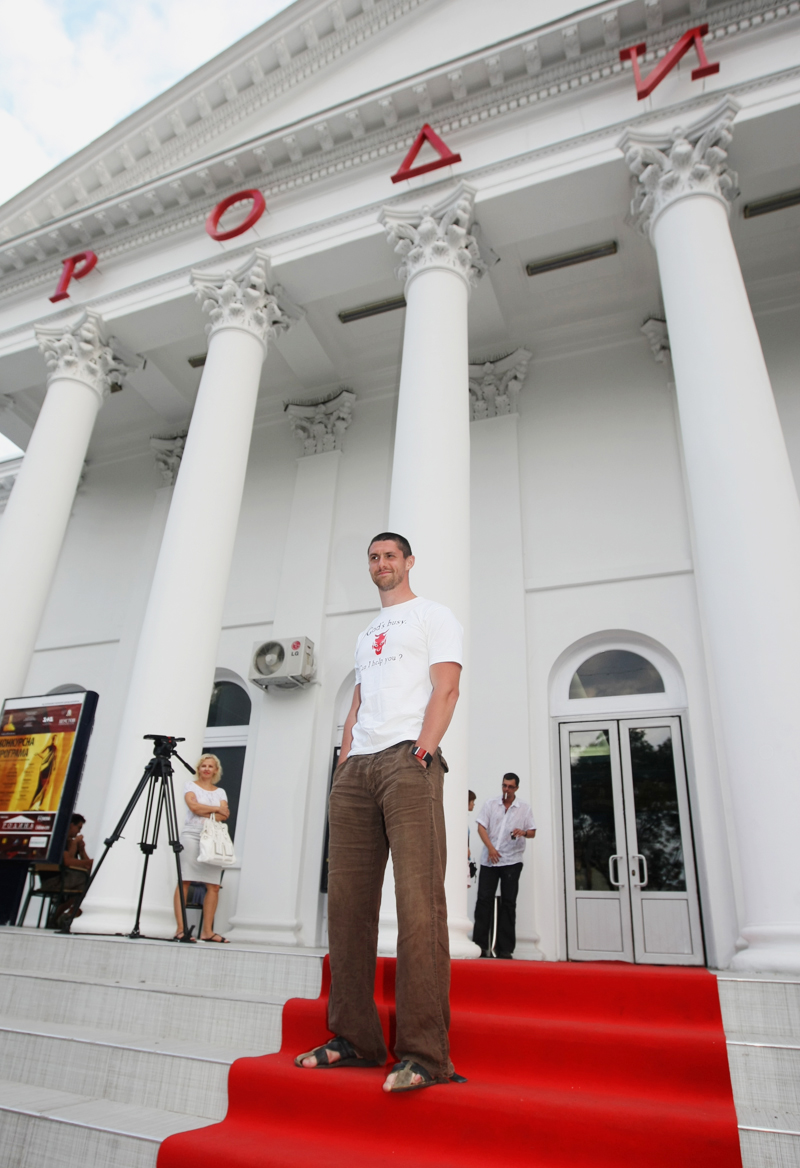

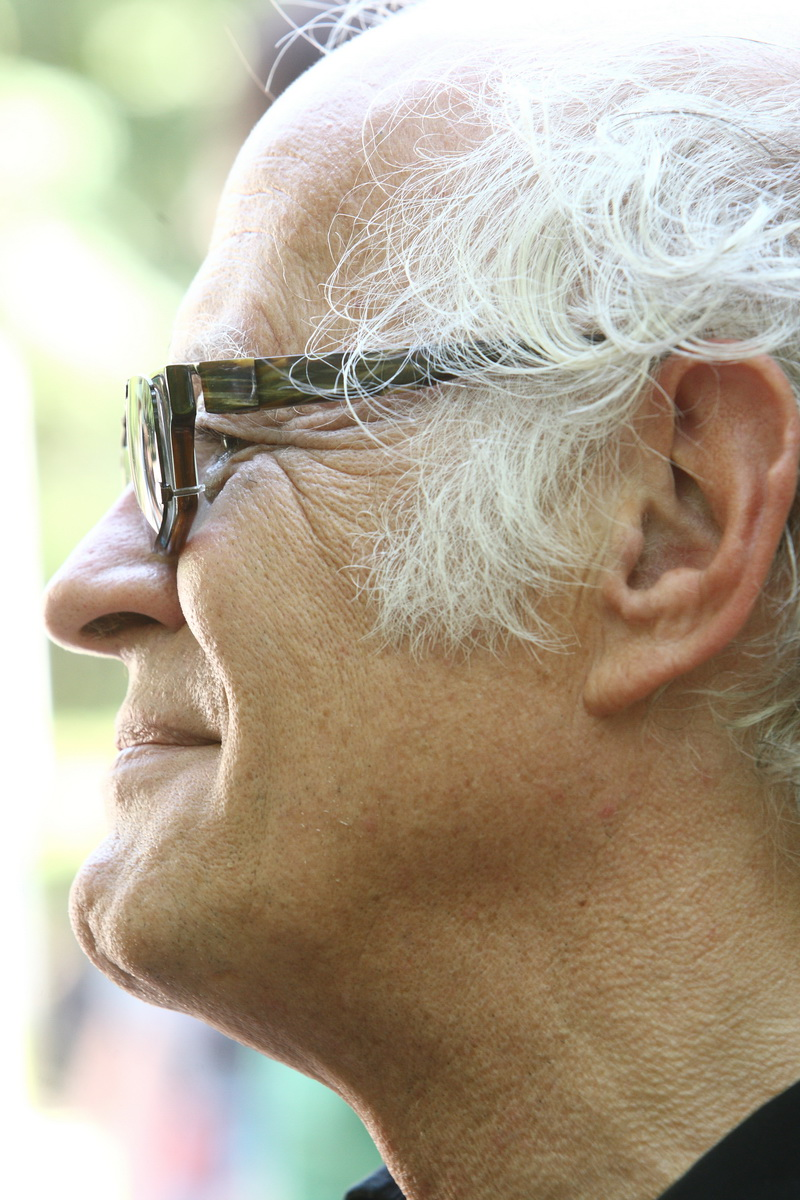
Jos Stelling

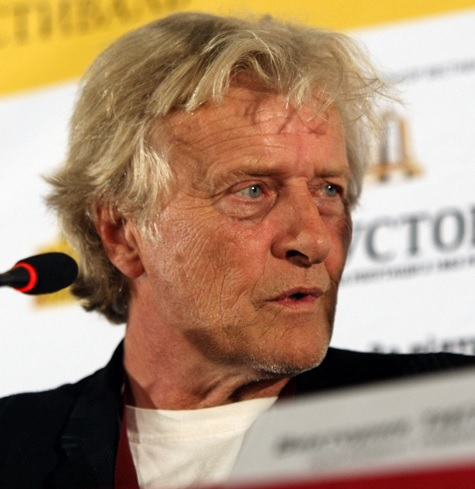
Rutger Hauer

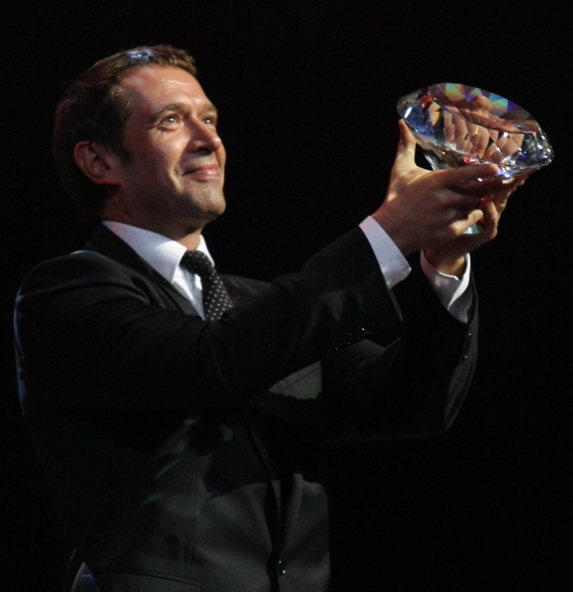
actor Vladimir Mashkov (Russia)

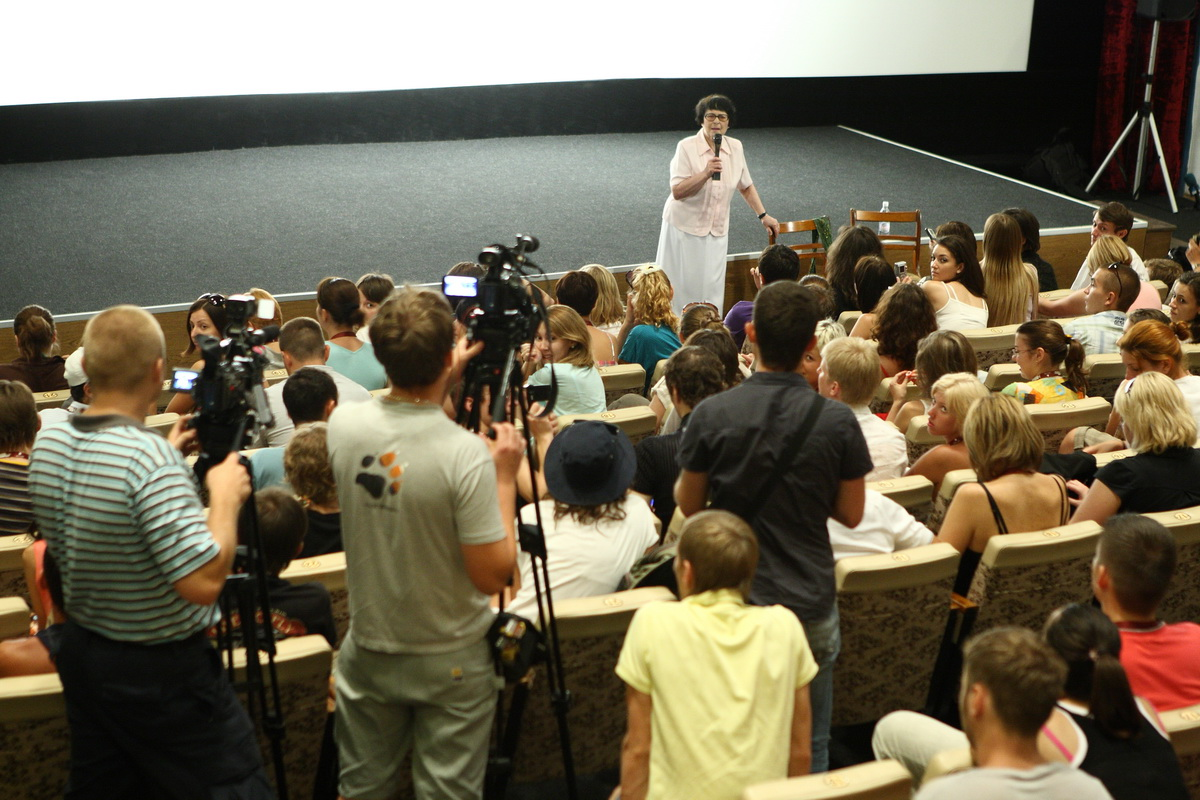

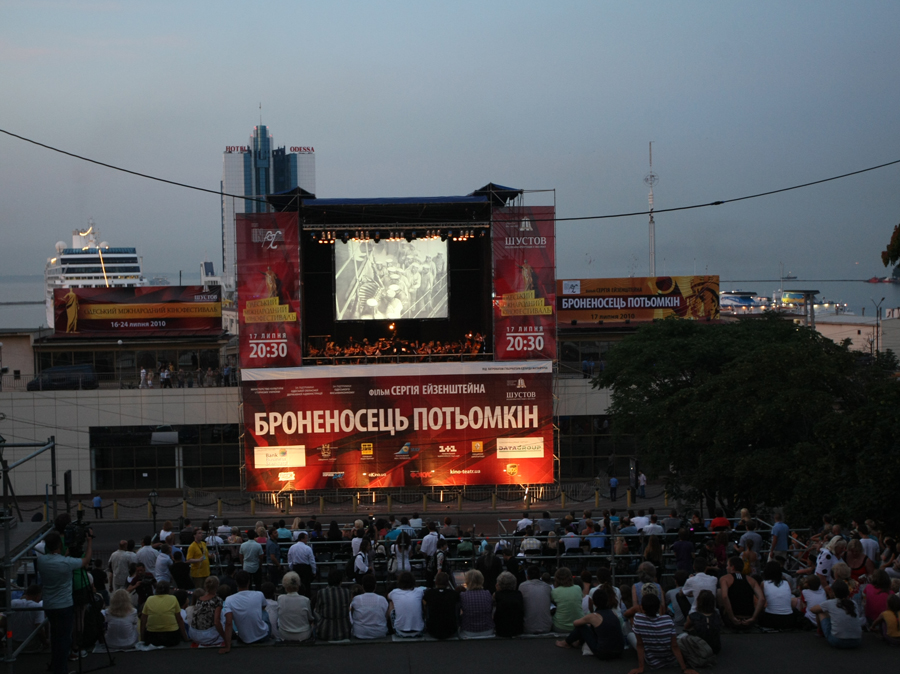
The screening of "Battleship Potemkin" on the Potemkin Steps

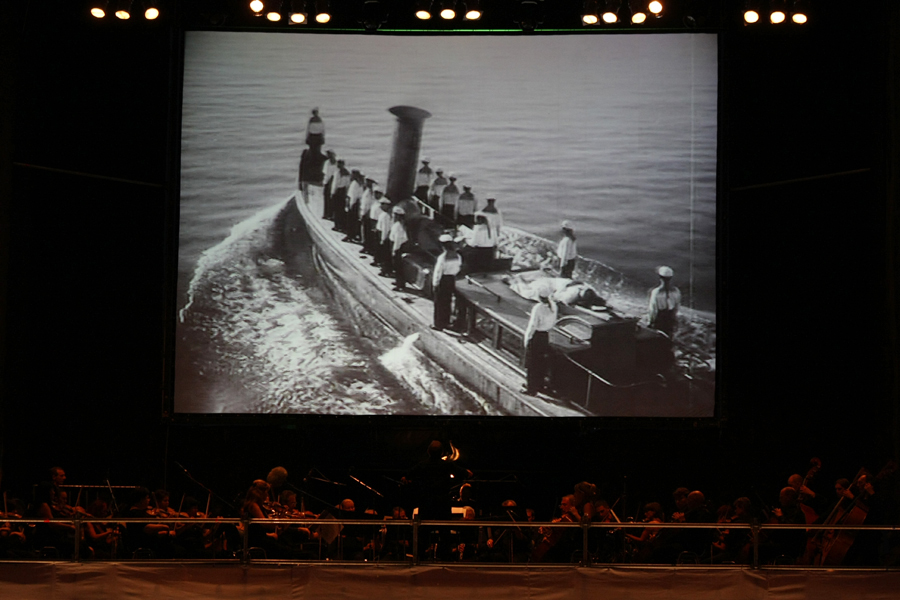
The screening of "Battleship Potemkin" on the Potemkin Steps

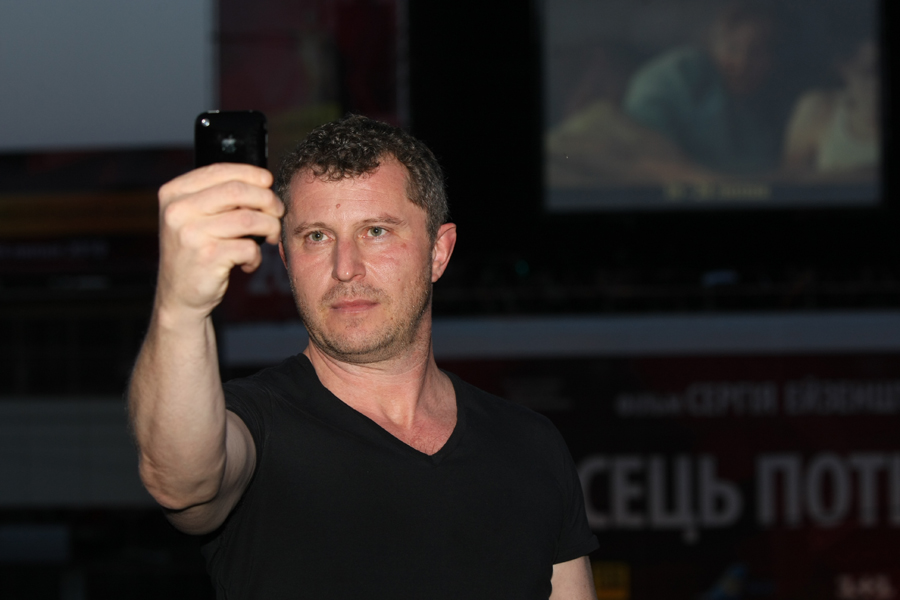
Vadim Perelman

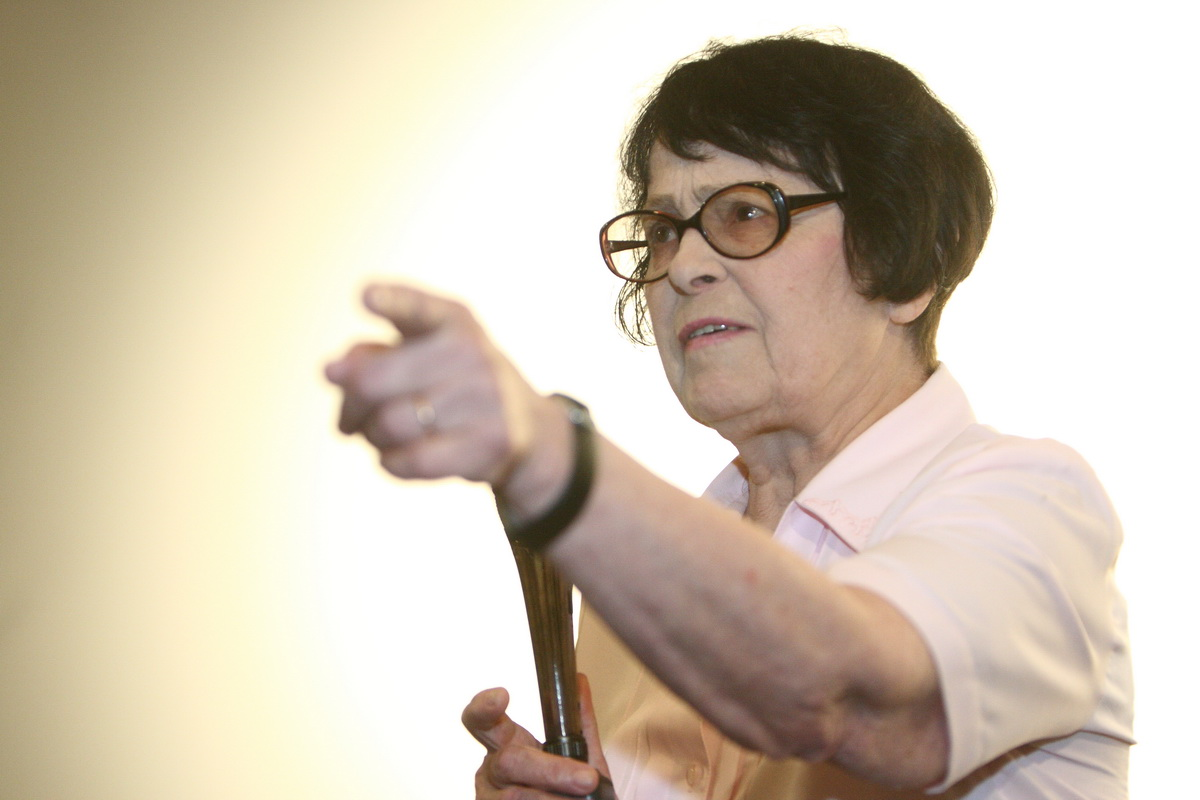
Ukrainian director Kira Muratova

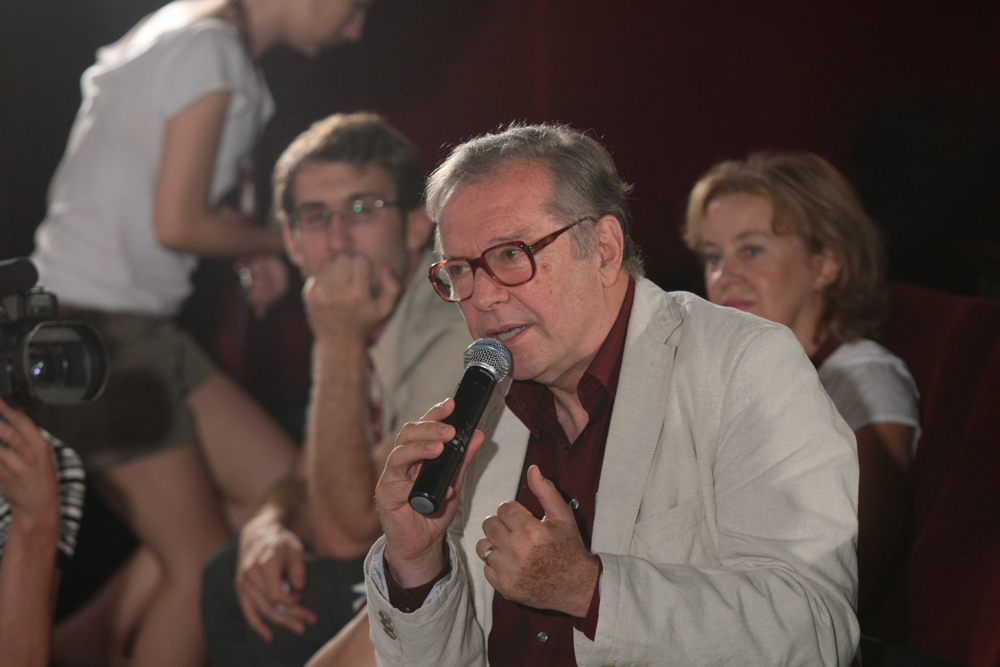
Krzysztof Zanussi

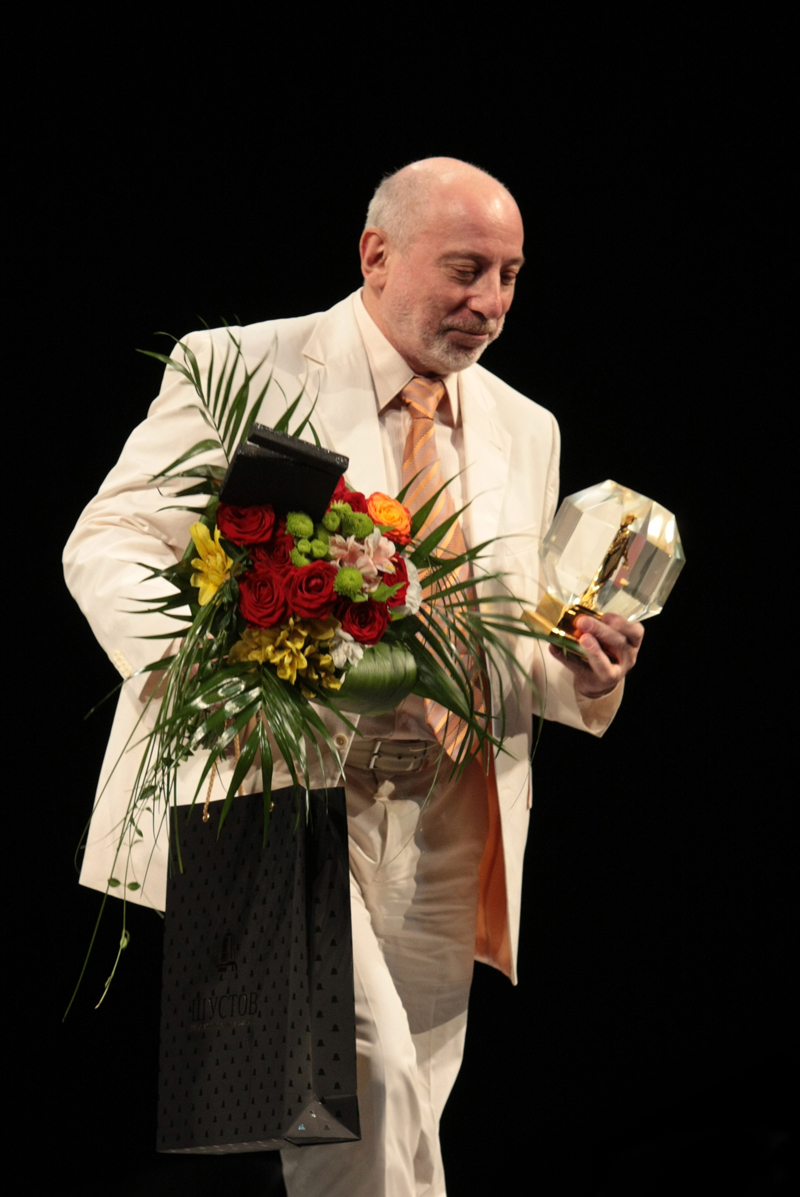
director Jury Mamin (Russia)

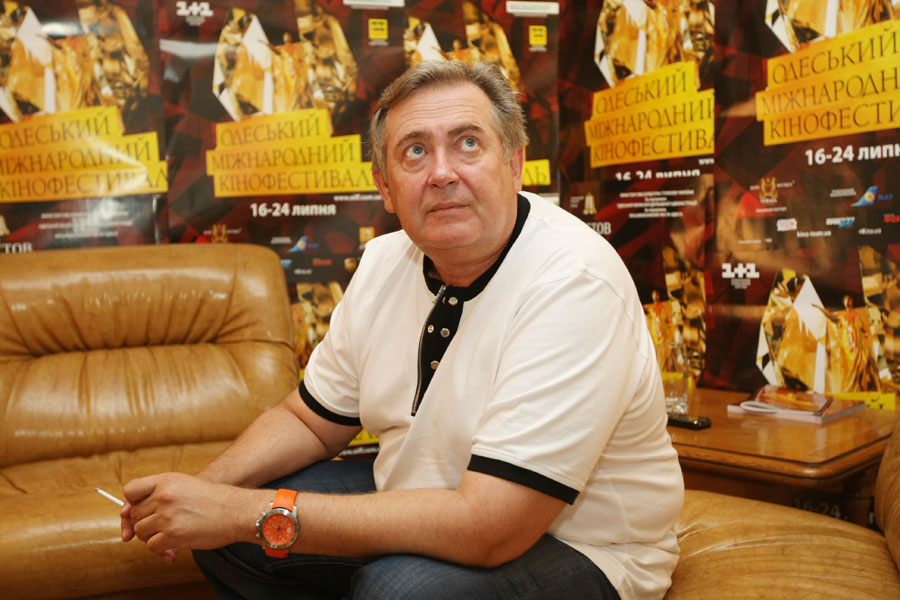
actor Yuriy Stoyanov (Russia)

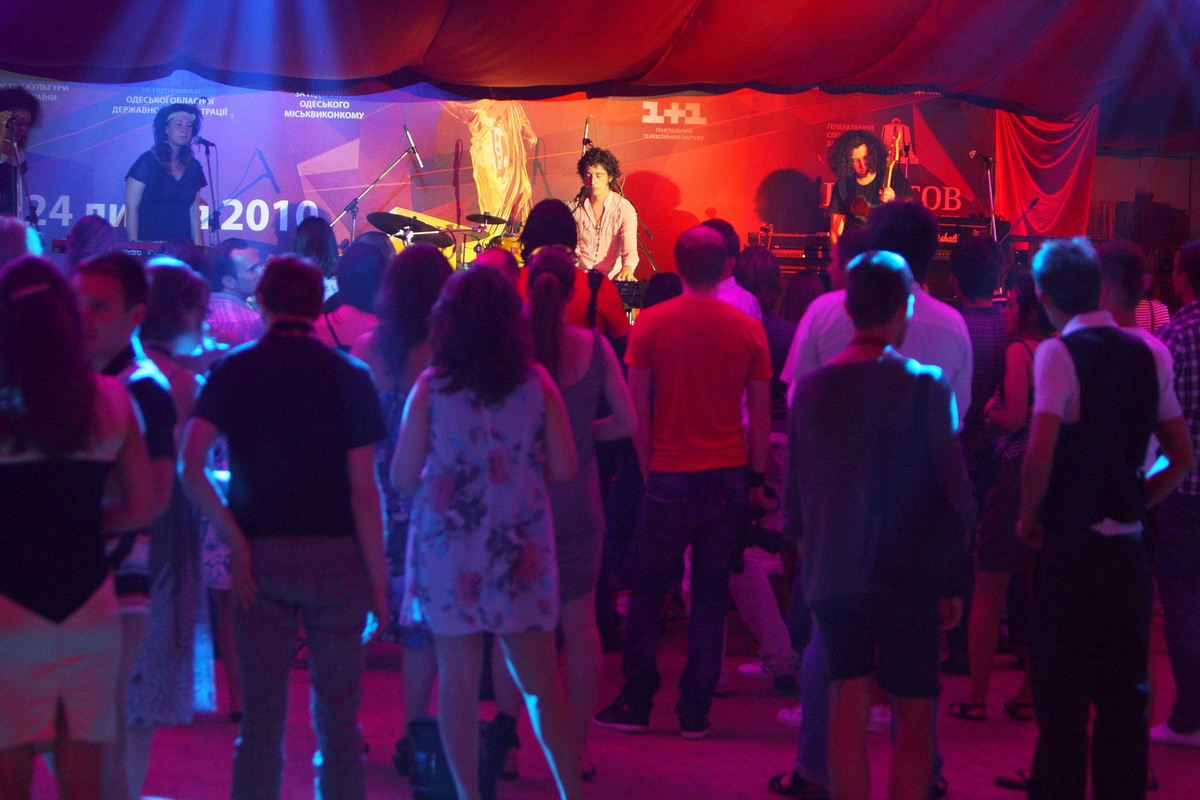

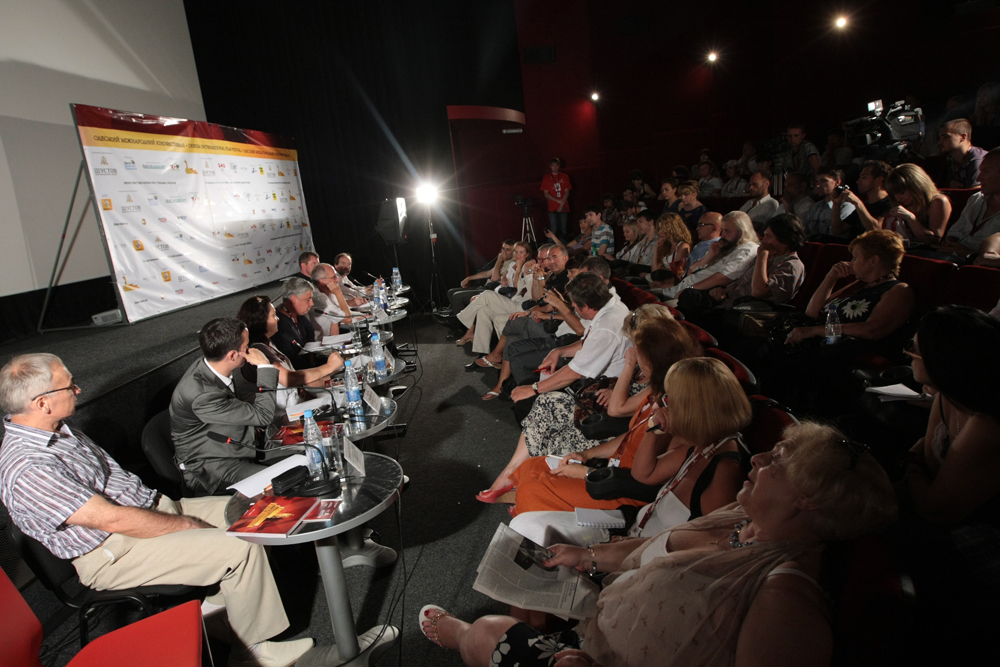
