= 2nd Odesa International Film Festival =

2011 film festival in Ukraine

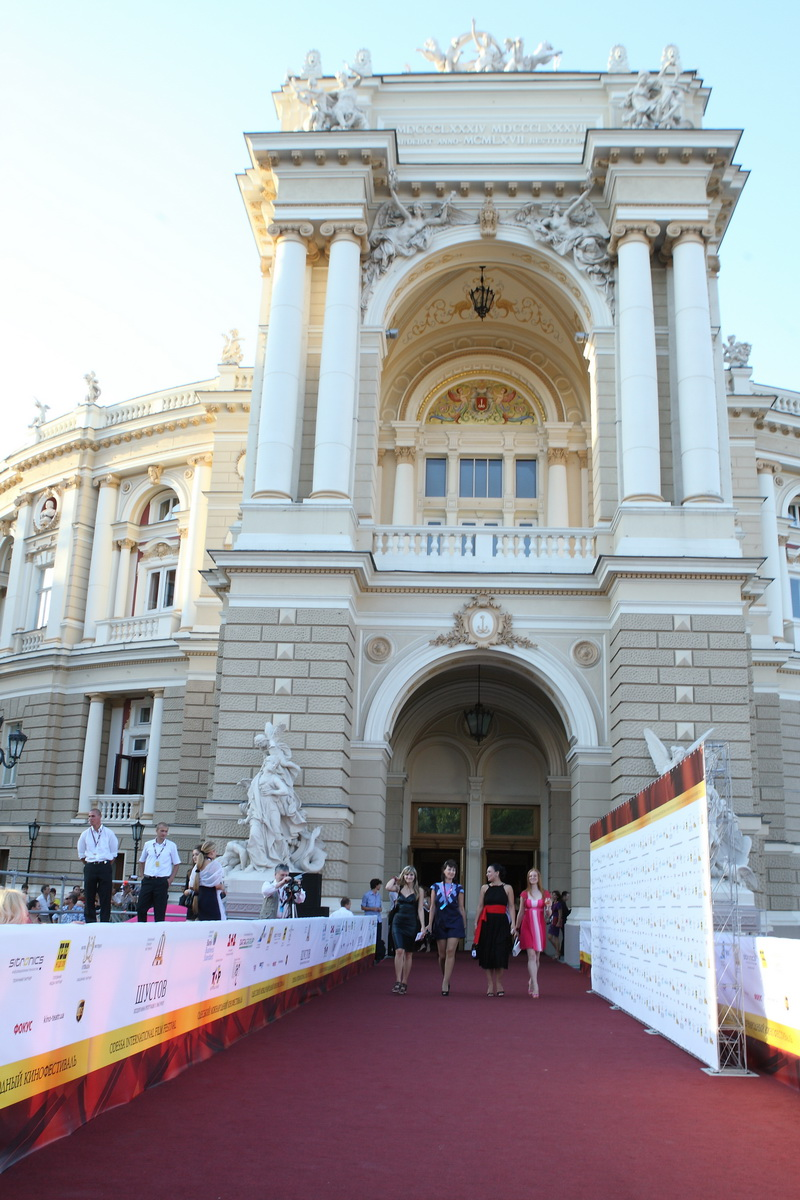
- Opening film: "The Artist" (Dir. Michel Hazanavicius), France
- Closing film: "Brothel Lights" (Dir.Aleksandr Gordon), Russia
- Location: Odesa (Ukraine)
- Founded: 2010
- Awards: Grand Prix "The Golden Duke" - "Tomboy" (Dir. Céline Sciamma), France
- No. of films: 14 (in Competition), 57 (out of competition)
- Festival date: 15–23 July 2011
- Website: http://www.oiff.com.ua/old

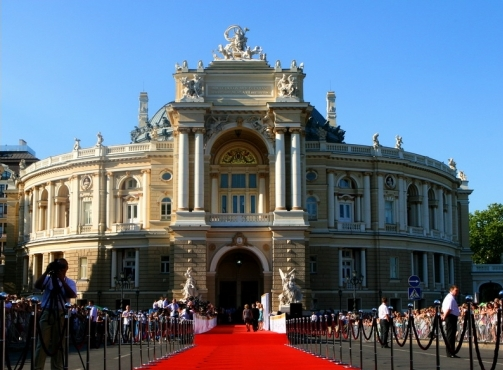
Red Carpet to walk Odesa International Film Festival 2011

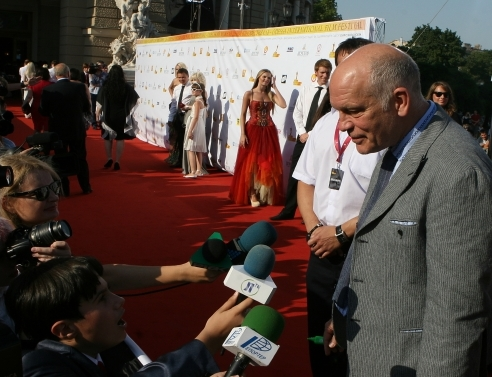
John Malkovich on the Odesa film festival 2011

The second Odesa International Film Festival (Ukrainian: Одеський міжнародний кінофестиваль) took place in Odesa (Ukraine) from 15 to 23 July 2011.

== History ==
71 films were screened at the festival, and the total number of audience members was tallied at over 70 thousand. Over 5 thousand guests were accredited at the festival along with over 450 journalists and other members of the press from Ukraine, Russia, Germany, the United States, Romania, Italy and other countries. A total of 175 hotel rooms were reserved for the guests of the festival in 5 central Odesa hotels. The opening ceremonies, which were broadcast live by the Ukrainian TV channel “Inter”, were watched by over 2 million viewers. In addition, nearly 7 thousand followed the online broadcasts of the festival through the official Festival site.

14 new films from France, the UK, Belgium, Sweden, Germany, Hong Kong, Ukraine, Poland, Finland, Italy, Bulgaria, Russia, Israel, and Uruguay were part of the competition. The international film jury was headed by the well-known Polish actor and rector of the Kraków Film Academy Jerzy Stuhr, who has a bond with Odesa with his role in Juliusz Machulski's film “Dejа Vu” filmed in 1988.

A list of guests of the festival included Hollywood star John Malkovich, directors Nikita Mihalkov, Otar Iosseliani, Vadim Perelman, Sergei Solovyov, Nana Jorjadze, Yuri Kara, Alexander Mitta, Valery Todorovsky, Fyodor Bondarchuk, actors Bogdan Stupka, Maria de Medeiros, Ada Rogovtseva, Gosha Kutsenko, Dmitriy Dyuzhev, and others. At the Opening ceremony in the Odesa Opera Theater, an honored guest of the festival – John Malkovich, awarded a special prize, the “Crystal Crystal” to his Russian colleague Nikita Mihalkov. This prize was awarded for input into the cinematographic development of Odesa. Weeks earlier, Mihakov presented a Lifetime Achievement Award to Malkovich at the Moscow Film Festival.

The opening film of the Festival was Michel Hazanavicius's “The Artist” which received the award for the best male role at Cannes Film Festival-2011. The closing ceremony served as the venue for the world premiere of Alexander Gordon's Russian film “Brothel Lights.” This film was filmed in Odesa.

The festival employed three main screening venues. “Rodina” movie theater served as the festival center and two more theaters were added for afternoon and evening screenings – “Cinema City” and “U-cinema.” The “Cinema-City” venue also became the place for the “film-market.” At the other end of the downtown area, “U-cinema” theatre at the Odesa Film Studio once again served as the central location for the “Summer Film School.” Master classes this year were taught by many guests of the festival including John Malkovich, Otar Iosseliani, Vadim Perelman, Sergei Solovyov, Nana Jorjadze, Alexander Mitta, Valeriy Todorovskiy, Jerzy Stuhr, Maria de Medeiros, American screen-writing and directing consultant Mark Travis, and others. In the second year of the festival, a project called “Screen-writers Workshop” was added to the Summer Film School. This project included intensive and highly personalized seminars for a select group of screenwriters whose works were selected in a screen-play contest. The second Odesa Film Festival also included two new professionally geared events – The Film-market and the pitching of film projects.

The Grand Prix of the festival went to the French Film -"Tomboy" written and directed by Celine Sciamma. At the closing ceremony, The Golden Duke statue was accepted on behalf of the filmmaker by Sophie Cattani who played one of the lead roles in the film.

On the very last day of the festival it received the great honor of being recognized by a well-known, international journalistic association – the Hollywood Foreign Press Association (HFPA) who are responsible for awarding the Golden Globes. Hollywood Foreign Press member Gabriel Lerman presented the festival with a sign of this recognition.

== Jury ==
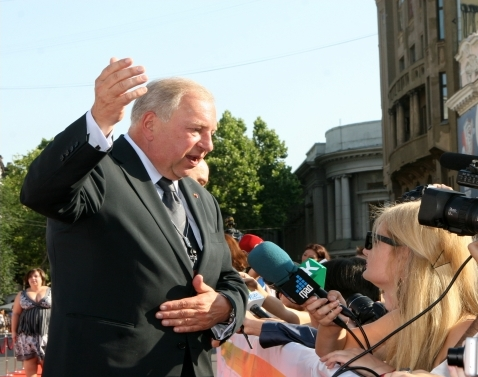
Jerzy Stuhr - head the main jury OIFF2011

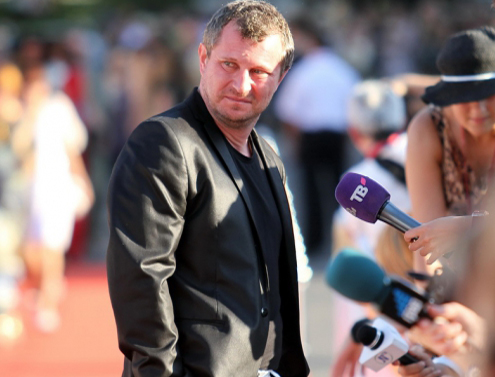
Vadim Perelman

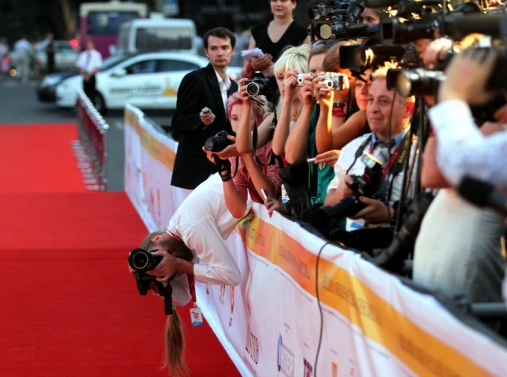
Red Carpet to walk Odesa International Film Festival 2011

Main Jury of the Odesa Film Festival:

- Jerzy Stuhr – Jury chairman, actor, director, Poland
- Maria de Medeiros – actress, director, singer, Portugal
- Ada Rogovtseva - actress, Ukraine
- Valery Todorovsky – Director, producer, Russia
- Klaus Eder – Film critic, Germany

International Federation of Film societes Jury:

- Andrey Alferov, Ukraine
- João Paulo Macedo, Portugal
- Raivo Olmet, Estonia

Ukrainian Laboratory Jury:

- Nana Dzhordzhadze, director, Georgia
- Virginie Devesa, producer, France
- Sergey Chliyants, producer, Russia
- Dmytro Sholudko, Head of Board of Directors, Odesa Cognac Factory (Shustov TM), Ukraine

Jury of Ukrainian critics:

- Alex Pershko - editor in chief of cinema portal kino-teatr.ua, Ukraine;
- Irina Gordeychuk - film critic and television presenter, Ukraine;
- Valery Baranovsky - film expert, member of the Odesa branch of the National Union of Cinematographers, Ukraine.

Jury of projects pitching:

- Katerina Kopylova – The head of the state film agency, Ukraine
- Vadim Perelman - film director, US
- Vladimir Voitenko - film critic and broadcaster, Ukraine
- Simone Baumann - film expert from German Films agency, German
- Vlad Ryashin - producer, Ukraine
- Waldemar Dziki - producer, Poland
- Valery Kodetsky - CEO of UDP company, Ukraine

== Competitive program ==
Competition program Odesa IFF 2011

- Tomboy (Dir. Céline Sciamma, France);
- PorNO / Бес Пор No (Dir. Aleksander Shapiro, Ukraine);
- Simple Simon / I rymden finns inga känslor, (Dir. Andreas Öhman, Sweden);
- The practice in beauty / Упражнения в прекрасном, (Dir. Viktor Shamirov,Russia);
- Whatsoeverly / Qualunquemente,(Dir. Giulio Manfredonia, Italy);
- Lapland Odyssey / Napapiirin sankarit,(Dir. Dome Karukoski, Finland, Iceland, Sweden);
- Shelter / Podslon, (Dir. Dragomir Sholev, Bulgaria);
- Holy Business / Świety Interes, (Dir. Maciej Wojtyszko, Poland);
- Kill me please, (Dir.Olias Barco, Belgium);
- Love in a Puff (film) / Chi ming yu chun giu, (Dir.Pang Ho-Cheung, Hong Kong);
- Submarine, (Dir.Richard Ayoade,United Kingdom, United States);
- 2 Night(Dir.Roi Werner, Israel);
- A Useful Life / La vida útil, (Dir.Federico Vejroj, Uruguay, Spain);
- Almanya – Welcome to Germany / Almanya - Willkommen in Deutschland, (Dir.Yasemin Samdereli, Germany).

== Non-competitive program ==
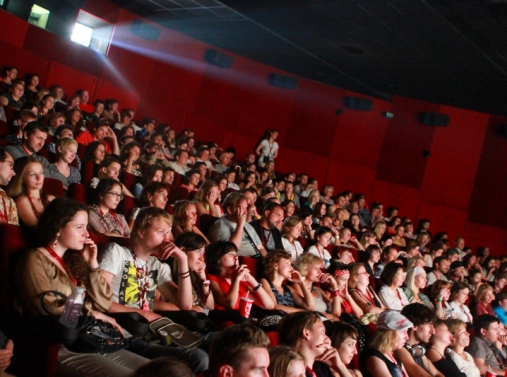
In a festival center

The non-competitive program included a line-up of favorites from the year's world festival circuit – the Festival of festivals, a retrospective of Monty Python, two retrospectives – “Made in Odesa” and “Ukrainian Comedies” as well as two national programs – “The French Panorama” and “New Russian cinema.”

Special screenings included the CIS premiere of Sebastian Dehnhardt's documentary film Klitschko, Lars von Trier's Melancholia, Wim Wenders's Pina, and Tom Hanks's Larry Crown. Ukrainian premieres included Le Havre (Dir.Aki Kaurismäki), Three (Dir.Tom Tykwer),"Life in a Day (Dir.Kevin Macdonald), Habemus Papam (Dir.Nanni Moretti), A Distant Neighborhood (Dir.Sam Garbarski)

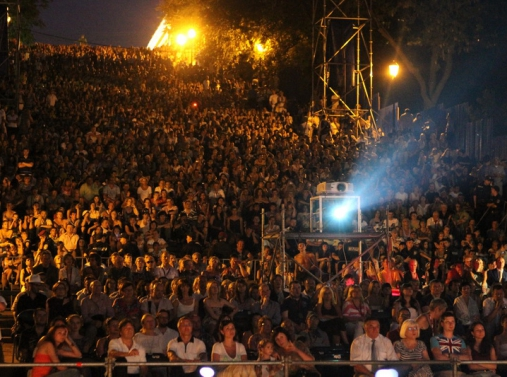
"Metropolis" on the Potemkin Stairs

== Special events ==
For the first time, the festival program was enriched with a new event called “KINO_LIVE,” - a series of film-concerts held in an outdoor venue. In this new screening space – the steps of the Langeronovskiy Descent, masterworks of film were presented with live musical accompaniment. Such works included the films of Georges Melies, which were presented to the audiences by the filmmaker's great-granddaughter and great-great-grandson. Esteban Sapir's Avant-garde Argentinean film Antenna was screened accompanied by the Ukrainian rock group “Еsthetic Education”.

As it was with the first Odesa Film Festival, one of the most awe-inspiring events of the week was the outdoor screening on the Potemkin Stairs. On 16 July, this famous staircase became a theater for over two thousand viewers who gathered together to watch Fritz Lang's 1927 classic Metropolis with the accompaniment of a full symphonic orchestra.

== Winners ==
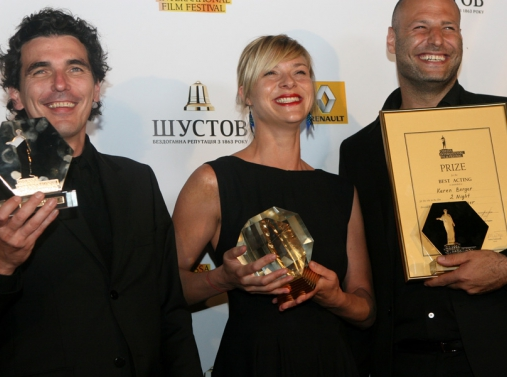
Winners of the Odesa international film festival-2011

Winners of the 2nd Odesa International Film Festival-2010

On 23 July 2011, at the closing ceremony in the Opera House, the jury announced the winners of the 2nd Odesa International Film Festival:

- Grand Prix of the Festival - Best film - "Tomboy" (Dir. Céline Sciamma, France);
- Best Director - Olias Barco, author of the film "Kill me please", Belgium);
- Best Acting – Keren Berger, the leading actor in the movie "2 Night" (Dir.Roi Werner), Israel);
- Special Jury Mention - "Shelter" / "Podslon", (Dir. Dragomir Sholev, Bulgaria);
- Special Jury Mention – "A Useful Life" / "La vida útil", (Dir.Federico Vejroj, Uruguay, Spain);
- Audience Award – "Almanya – Welcome to Germany" / "Almanya - Willkommen in Deutschland", (Dir.Yasemin Samdereli, Germany).

Parallel Jury Prizes:

- “Don Quixote” Prize of the International Federation of film Societies - -"Tomboy" (Dir. Céline Sciamma, France);
- Special Prize of the International Federation of Film Societies - "Lapland Odyssey" / "Napapiirin sankarit",(Dir. Dome Karukoski, Finland, Iceland, Sweden);
- A prize of national judge of film critics for the best film of festival from National Union of Ukrainian cinematography – "Kill me please", (Dir.Olias Barco, Belgium);
- “Nickolay Shustov” Prize for the best Ukrainian film awarded by the “Ukrainian Laboratory” Jury-"Dog Waltz" (Dir.Taras Tkachenko,Ukraine) from the anthology "Lovers in Kiev".
- Pitching Jury Prize in the amount of 25,000 UA Grivnas - "Outsider" (Dir.Vera Yakovenko,Ukraine);
