= Sarah Rivka =

American film producer

Sarah Miller, known professionally as Sarah Rivka, is an American writer, musician, and filmmaker. She is best known for producing Hi, How Are You Daniel Johnston, My Suicide, and her work in the experimental music duo Sneer.

== Awards ==
- Prize for Excellence in International Education — The Asia Society 2008
- Camério Irvin Pelletier Humanitas — Carrousel international du film de Rimouski 2009
- Jury Award Best Experimental Film — NFFTY 2013
