= The Cat Who Lived with Anne Frank =

2019 children's book

- Author: David Lee Miller, Steven Jay Rubin
- Illustrator: Elizabeth Baddeley
- Language: English
- Genre: Children's picture book
- Published: 2019 (Penguin Random House)
- Publication place: United States
- Media type: Print (hardback)
- Pages: 40
- ISBN: 978-1-5247-4150-1

The Cat Who Lived with Anne Frank is a 2019 children's book by David Lee Miller and Steven Jay Rubin, illustrated by Elizabeth Baddeley. It details the events leading up to the Holocaust, through the eyes of Mouschi, a cat who lived with Anne Frank.

Mentioned in her diary, The Diary of a Young Girl, Mouschi was a real cat who belonged to Peter, the teenage boy also in hiding with Anne. Anne Frank was forced to leave her own cat, Moortje, behind after the Nazi invasion.

== Synopsis ==
When Mouschi the cat goes with his owner, Peter, to a secret annex, he meets a girl named Anne Frank. Bright, kind and loving, Anne dreams of freedom and of becoming a writer whose words change the world. But Mouschi, along with Anne and her family and friends, must stay hidden, hoping for the war to end and for a better future.

Told from the perspective of the cat who actually lived with Anne inside of the famous Amsterdam annex, this book paints a picture of a young girl who wistfully dreams of a better life for herself and her friends, tentatively wonders what mark she might leave on the world, and, above all, adamantly believes in the goodness of people.

== Reception ==
School Library Journal, in a review of The Cat Who Lived with Anne Frank, wrote "This gentle introduction to one of the darkest times in modern history ... can also provide a starting point for more in-depth study, reading, and discussion." The Jewish Book Council wrote "A gentle but effective introduction to one aspect of the Holocaust, and to this well-known family. ... an independent read for those at the upper end of the age range. It is an excellent resource for introducing the Holocaust in classrooms."
