= Rainey Qualley =

American actress and singer (born 1989)

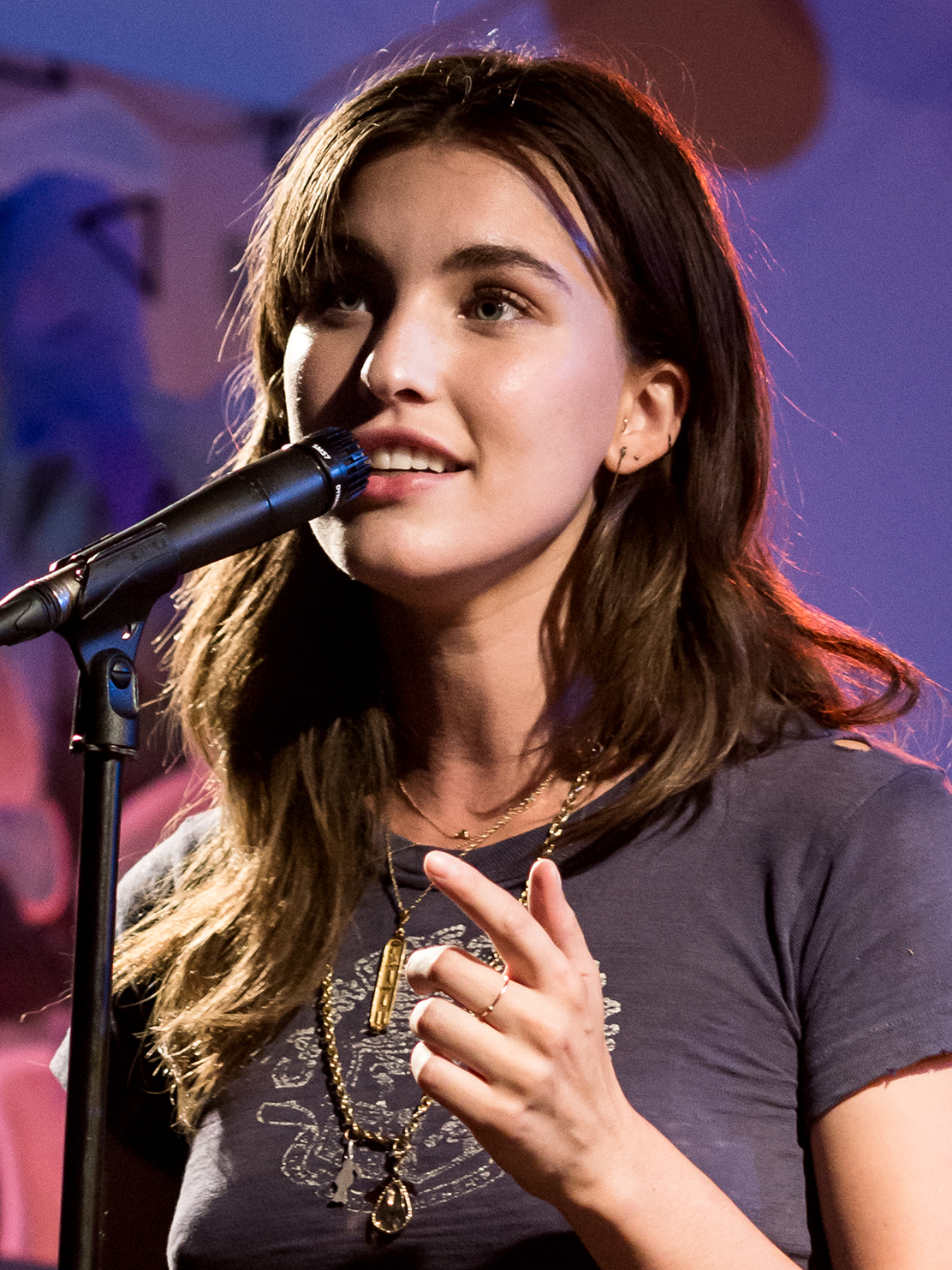
- Qualley in 2017
- Born: Rainsford Dubose Qualley; March 11, 1989 (age 37); New York City, U.S.
- Other name: Rainsford
- Occupations: Actress; singer; songwriter
- Years active: 2012–present
- Spouse: Anthony Wilson (m. 2025)
- Children: 1
- Mother: Andie MacDowell
- Relatives: Margaret Qualley (sister)

Rainsford Dubose Qualley (/ˈkwɔːli/ KWAW-lee; born March 11, 1989) is an American actress and singer. Qualley is a daughter of actress Andie MacDowell and the sister of actress Margaret Qualley, and made her acting debut in the 2012 film Mighty Fine. She also releases music under the name Rainsford.

== Early life ==
Rainsford Dubose Qualley was born in on March 11, 1989 (Note: Some sources incorrectly state Qualley's birth year as 1990.) in New York City and grew up in North Carolina. Her parents are Andie MacDowell, an actress and model, and Paul Qualley, a musician, contractor, rancher, and former model. She has two siblings: an older brother, Justin and a younger sister, actress and model Margaret Qualley. Rainey and her sister were debutantes and formally presented at Le Bal des débutantes in Paris.

== Career ==
Qualley in 2015 discussing her EP Turn Down the Lights

Qualley in 2022 discussing her film work

Qualley made her debut as Miss Golden Globe in 2012. In the same year, she starred in Mighty Fine, opposite her mother Andie MacDowell, directed by Debbie Goodstein. In 2014, Qualley starred in Falcon Song directed by Jason Corgan Brown. In 2015, she guest starred in an episode of Mad Men. In 2018, she starred in Perfect directed by Eddie Alcazar. She made a cameo appearance as herself in Ocean's 8. In 2021, Qualley starred in The Shuroo Process which was directed by Emrhys Cooper.

Qualley releases and writes music under the stage name Rainsford.

In 2016 Qualley released the song "Too Close" with Red Light Management. In 2017, she released the song "Rendezvous". In 2018, she released her debut extended play Emotional Support Animal. In 2019, she released two songs, "Passionate" and "Open Open". In 2020, Qualley released two songs, "2 Cents" and "Crying in the Mirror". She collaborated with Twin Shadow on two songs on his fourth studio album.

== Personal life ==
On December 10, 2024, she gave birth to her first child, a daughter, with fiancé Anthony Wilson. Qualley and Wilson married at the Perch in Twin Peaks, a retreat in Lake Arrowhead, California on October 31, 2025.

== Filmography ==
Rainey Qualley film work
Year	Title	Role	Notes
2012	Mighty Fine	Maddie Fine	
2014	Falcon Song	Sarah Lou	
2018	Perfect	Perl	
2018	Ocean's 8	Herself	
2021	Ultrasound	Katie	
2021	The Shuroo Process	Nadia	
2022	Shut In	Jessica	

Rainey Qualley television work
Year	Title	Role	Notes
2015	Mad Men	Cindy	Episode: "Severance"
2020	Love in the Time of Corona	Elle	limited series, main role

== Discography ==
=== EPs ===
- Turn Down the Lights (2015)
- Emotional Support Animal (2018)

=== Singles ===
- "Me and Johnny Cash" (2015)
- "Too Close" (2016)
- "Rendezvous" (2017)
- "Somewhere Else" (2018)
- "Passionate" (2019)
- "Open Open" (2019)
- "2 Cents" (2020)
- "Crying in the Mirror" (2020)
- "Oh My God" (2020)
- "Love Me Like You Hate Me" (2020)

=== Guest appearances ===
List of non-single guest appearances, with other performing artists, showing year released and album name
Title	Year	Other performer(s)	Album
"Brace"	2018	Twin Shadow	Caer
"Sympathy"	2018	Twin Shadow	Caer
"My Margaret"	2020	by.ALEXANDER	000 CHANNEL BLACK
“Mille Cose”	2021	Mecna	Mentre Nessuno Guarda
