= Mighty Fine =

2012 film by Debbie Goodstein-Rosenfeld

- Theatrical release poster
- Directed by: Debbie Goodstein-Rosenfeld
- Written by: Debbie Goodstein-Rosenfeld
- Produced by: Ajae Clearway; Kathryn Wallack; Debbie Goodstein-Rosenfeld
- Starring: Chazz Palminteri; Andie MacDowell; Jodelle Ferland; Rainey Qualley
- Cinematography: Bobby Bukowski
- Edited by: Suzy Elmiger
- Music by: Max Avery Lichtenstein
- Production company: Mighty Fine Productions
- Distributed by: Adopt Films
- Release date: May 25, 2012 (United States)
- Running time: 79 minutes
- Country: United States
- Language: English
- Budget: $3.7 million
- Box office: $27,900

Mighty Fine is a 2012 American comedy drama film written and directed by Debbie Goodstein-Rosenfeld, starring Chazz Palminteri, Andie MacDowell, Jodelle Ferland, and Rainey Qualley. It was given a limited theatrical release in the United States on May 25, 2012, by Adopt Films.

== Synopsis ==
In 1974, Joe Fine, a Jewish-American businessman from Brooklyn, New York, moves his wife Stella; his two daughters, Natalie and Maddie; and his textile factory in order to try to save it due to the decline of the textile industry. The cost of living is lower in the South and he can avoid travel, but he proceeds to live beyond his means including large extravagances. When a big investor decides to pull out of the deal, Joe takes a loan from the local mob. He has always suffered from anger management issues, but now stress is leading to depression and he lashes out at his wife and daughters. He sees a psychologist upon his wife's urging, but the doctor assures him that he is fine and his wife must be unduly concerned, because she is a Holocaust survivor. However, after he attempts to commit suicide, his wife pushes the panic button which Joe himself had installed. The police come and remand him to a psychiatric hospital to deal with his anxiety disorder. Meanwhile, his younger daughter Natalie, who is the narrator of the story and suffers from a fear of public speaking, slowly learns to move on and wins a $500 poetry competition sponsored by the Campbell's. Eventually, she sees her father again when he has recovered from stress.

== Cast ==
- Chazz Palminteri as Joe Fine
- Andie MacDowell as Stella Fine
- Jodelle Ferland as Natalie Fine
- Rainey Qualley as Maddie Fine
- Paul Ben-Victor as Bobby
- Arthur J. Nascarella as Lennie
- Richard Kohnke as Earl
- Kent Jude Bernard as Louie
- Monica Acosta as Elvis Concert Goer
- Erin Booth as High School Student
- Beau Brasseaux as Restaurant Customer (credited as Beau Brasso)
- Edward J. Clare as Patient
- Rebecca Collins as High School Student
- Miles Doleac as Mr. Smith
- Ron Flagge as Sam
- Emily D. Haley as Auditions Member
- Lee Hardee as Southern Boy
- Cynthia LeBlanc as Hospital Patient
- Elton LeBlanc as Hospital Patient
- Ann McKenzie as Poetry Contest Judge
- Joseph Meissner as Veterinarian
- Melody Noel as High School Student
- Geraldine Singer as Gracie
- Lauren Rae Sullivan as High School Student
- Brandon the Teir as Buddy The Family Dog
- Stefan Terrell as Store Clerk
- Lloyd Watts as Man On Car
- Todd Williams as Boris
- John T. Wilson Jr. as Wiseguy
- Janeane Garofalo as The Narrator

== Critical reception ==
The film received a rating of 18% on Rotten Tomatoes. The Hollywood Reporter gave it a scathing review, suggesting it stood "a slim chance of carving out much of a niche from an anticipated Memorial Day weekend limited release." The Los Angeles Times published a similarly bad review, commenting that Andie MacDowell seemed "so constricted by her awkward Polish accent and timid persona that she tends to disappear in front of us." Stephen Holden of The New York Times gave the film a positive review, saying that it is an "incisive portrait of an insecure, manic-depressive tyrant that Mr. Palminteri makes entirely believable."
