= Gabriel Sunday =

American actor

- Born: October 18, 1985 (age 40); Petaluma, California
- Occupations: Actor; director; writer; producer; editor
- Years active: 2004-present

Gabriel Chechik Sunday (born October 18, 1985) is an American actor and director, best known for portraying Archibald Holden Buster Williams in the teen comedy-drama film Archie's Final Project, and for directing and starring in the Daniel Johnston short film Hi, How Are You Daniel Johnston? as '1983 Daniel Johnston' alongside his modern day, real life counterpart.

== Filmography ==
=== Film ===
Year	Title	Role	Notes
2005	Now You See It...	Brandon	
2009	Archie's Final Project	Archibald Holden Buster Williams	
2009	Taking Woodstock	Steven	
2009	Year One	Seth	
2013	Snake & Mongoose	Larry Wood	
2014	Falcon Song	Syd	
2015	Hi, How Are You Daniel Johnston?	1983 Daniel Johnston	
2018	First Timers	Nico	Short film
2019	Dope State	Tyler Gopnik, TazzyDabz, Birdman, Martin, Luna, Marcus Wilkerson	also co-writer, co-director, co-editor

== Awards and nominations ==
Sunday has been nominated for, and won, a number of awards.

Association	Year	Category	Title	Result
Gen Art Film Festival	2009	Best Feature	My Suicide	Won
Slamdance Film Festival	2016	Honorable Mention	Hi, How Are You Daniel Johnston?	Won
Sydney Underground Film Festival	2016	Dead Oscar	Hi, How Are You Daniel Johnston?	Won
