= Falcon Song =

2014 film

- Theatrical Release Poster
- Directed by: Jason Corgan Brown
- Screenplay by: Jason Corgan Brown and Michelle Poteet Lisanti
- Story by: Jason Corgan Brown
- Produced by: Jason Corgan Brown, p.g.a.; Greg Townsend; Michael Green; Jeter Rhodes; Toby Guidry; Jennifer A. Haire; Kristen Taylor
- Starring: Rainey Qualley; Gabriel Sunday; Martin Kove; James Storm
- Cinematography: Bruce Francis Cole
- Edited by: Jason Corgan Brown and Aria Russo
- Music by: Jason Corgan Brown; The Moody Blues; Kate Bush; Dum Dum Girls; Lucy Langlas; The Secret Language; Light House; Nightfur
- Production company: Corgan Pictures
- Distributed by: Gravitas Ventures and Laser Beam Releasing
- Release dates: January 31, 2014 (Santa Barbara International Film Festival); March 21, 2014 (United States)
- Running time: 109 minutes
- Country: United States
- Language: English

Falcon Song is a 2014 Contemporary Western film written and directed by Jason Corgan Brown. It stars Rainey Qualley, Gabriel Sunday, and Martin Kove. The 1980s style film explores themes of land conservation and soul searching through a storybook world of quirky characters with touches of magical realism.

== Plot ==
A guitar playing drifter (Gabriel Sunday) helps a rancher's granddaughter (Rainey Qualley) find her true calling. They soon find themselves in the middle of a land war instigated by Cap Davenport (Martin Kove).

== Cast ==
- Rainey Qualley as Sarah Lou
- Gabriel Sunday as Syd
- Martin Kove as Caspian
- James Storm as Jabez
- Hart Turner as Randy
- Michael Yebba as "Monster"
- Jeter Rhodes as Frank

== Release ==
Falcon Song premiered at the 2014 Santa Barbara International Film Festival on 31 January. The film's US theatrical release began in Los Angeles on March 21, 2014. It subsequently screened across America at classic movie houses as well as Alamo Drafthouse Cinemas.

On May 23, 2014 Falcon Song was released in North America on major Cable On Demand and Internet VOD platforms including AT&T U-Verse, Verizon, Comcast, Cox, Charter, iTunes, Vudu, Xbox Live, and PlayStation Network.

== Reception ==
Falcon Song received mostly positive reviews when it was initially released in 2014. Ernest Hardy of LA Weekly wrote that Falcon Song is "modest, charming, and relatively subversive in the context of contemporary American film." and that the movie is "mercifully free of easy irony".

Sheri Linden of the Los Angeles Times stated that "The Director achieves a desired retro aesthetic" and that "The story's wholesomeness could have tipped into bizarro David Lynch dreamland, but it remains grounded, more or less."

Ethan Stewart of The Santa Barbara Independent wrote that the film is "A tongue-in-cheek celebration of 1980s' cinema, Jason Brown's Falcon Song legitimately makes you feel like you have travelled through time. The film goes retro with everything from production techniques and the soundtrack to its storyline…".

In Film Threat's review by Mark Bell, the film is highlighted as "a throwback to a less cynical age of cinema".
