= Sneer (band) =

- Origin: Los Angeles, California
- Years active: 2012–2015
- Members: Sarah Rivka; Tomas Seidita

Sneer was an American experimental music and award-winning filmmaking duo formed by Sarah Rivka and Tomas Seidita in Los Angeles, California.

== Discography ==
Singles

- "No Recent Activity" (2012)
- "After Dark" (2013)

== Awards ==
- Jury Award Best Experimental Film — NFFTY 2013
- First Place Experimental — Josiah Media Festival 2013
