= Archie's Final Project =

- Promotional film poster, showing the original title My Suicide
- Directed by: David Lee Miller
- Screenplay by: David Lee Miller; Eric J. Adams; Gabriel Sunday
- Story by: David Lee Miller; Jordan Miller
- Produced by: David Lee Miller; Larry Janss; Todd Traina; Eric J. Adams
- Starring: Gabriel Sunday; Brooke Nevin; David Carradine; Mariel Hemingway; Nora Dunn; Tony Hale
- Cinematography: Lisa Wiegand; Angie Hill
- Edited by: Gabriel Sunday; Jordan J. Miller
- Music by: Tim Kasher
- Production companies: Regenerate; Archie Films; Interscope Films; Red Rover Films; Luminaria
- Distributed by: Big Air Studios; Rocket Releasing
- Release dates: February 7, 2009 (BIFF); September 23, 2011 (United States)
- Running time: 105 minutes
- Country: United States
- Language: English

Archie's Final Project (also known by its original title My Suicide) is a 2011 American comedy-drama film produced and directed by David Lee Miller and written by Miller, Eric J. Adams, and Gabriel Sunday based on a story written by Miller and Jordan J. Miller. Sunday also served as second unit director, additional camera operator, and music editor along with starring in, co-editing, and co-producing the film. It won the best feature film prize for the 2009 Berlin International Film Festival's youth film section Generation 14plus. Music producers Jimmy Iovine and Polly Anthony and actor Harold Ramis served as executive producers. It received a limited theatrical release in the United States on September 23, 2011, and was released to home media on December 6, 2011.

== Plot ==
Archibald Holden Buster "Archie" Williams (Gabriel Sunday) begins his film (rife with cutaway gags and Archie imitating famous movie quotes) by discussing his upbringing in a typical upper-middle-class suburb, and lamenting that he is a porn-addicted virgin. When asked by his film teacher Mr. Bedford (Kurtis Bedford) what will be the subject of his final class, Archie dryly tells him that he plans to commit suicide on camera. Per school policy, Archie is sent to the counselor Mrs. Ellis (Sandy Martin) and soon taken into police custody for giving sardonic answers to her questions. Most of Archie's peers witness him handcuffed outside by a Ventura County Sheriff, including his crush Sierra Silver (Brooke Nevin). Archie's mother Gretchen (Nora Dunn), a lawyer and local activist, along with his father Daryl (Robert Kurcz), a football quarterback-turned-El Pollo Loco franchisee, also arrived at the scene and made a failed attempt to persuade the sheriff to let him go. Archie is placed on a 72-hour psychiatric hold, where he repeatedly calls his social worker a "cunt" until he is exasperated enough to approve Archie's return to school. Upon returning home, Archie gets in an argument with his parents about the police’s search in his bedroom/film studio in the family's pool house.

Upon returning to school, Archie gets a wide array of questions and responses from his peers. They asked about his idea for the film—ranging from general concern to nihilistic support, to outrage motivated by preventing suicide contagion. Other peers also opened up about their own mental health struggles, and a prayer circle was created for him by a religious student club. Two other students offered him drugs, and others told Archie about rumors people spread regarding his arrest. When a group of bullies grab Archie's camera away, Sierra Silver recovers it for him and asks to interview him for the school paper, though Archie initially declines. Archie also strikes up a friendship with Corey (Zachary Ray Sherman), who strongly relates to Archie's feelings of angst and disillusionment. Archie is later brought back to the mental institution for psychiatry sessions, during which he bonds with his new therapist Gafur Chandrasakar (Joe Mantegna) over their shared love of cinema and morbid sense of humor.

As Sierra continues to ask him for an interview, Archie continues to demur out of shyness, but eventually gives her a videotape expressing that he wants to meet. Despite Sierra poking fun at Archie's video being a "psychotic love note" for its blatant sexual references, derisions of her as "cliché", surreptitious footage taken of her walking around school, and a bizarre Hentai sequence—Sierra proceeds to interview Archie about his project. Over the course of several interviews, they find out that they're both fans of indie filmmaker Jesse Gabriel Vargas (David Carradine). They discussed the platitude that “it's a permanent solution to a temporary problem". And Sierra begins to open up about her brother Shane's death in a car crash one year ago, along with the intense pressure that her wealthy parents place on her to succeed academically and socially. They also visit each other's houses to conduct more interviews, but when Archie inadvertently notices razor cuts on the inside of Sierra's thighs and tries to get her to open up about her self-harm, she gets defensive and storms out of Archie's studio. However, Sierra later invites Archie to her bedroom to see her cutting razors, where she ritualistically cuts herself and Archie as well. They conduct several interviews with their peers about self-harm, and Archie later loses his virginity to Sierra in his bedroom/studio. After this incident, Sierra coldly tells him "Now you can kill yourself". Archie later shows Sierra some camera obscura footage (the same camera style used for the movie's very first scene) of his father Daryl consoling his mother Gretchen over the death of Gretchen's father, which was the only time Archie saw his parents show each other affection.

Sierra and Archie attend a drinking party with their peers. Archie, after becoming extremely intoxicated, is lured into a group sex session where he accepts a blowjob from another girl. Sierra reassures him that she is okay with him sleeping around for the evening. Archie later wanders away from the party with Corey and another small group to smoke marijuana and run around outside. The next morning, Archie's and Sierra's morning gym classes find Corey's dead body in the gym, having committed suicide by hanging himself from a basketball hoop. The gym teachers frantically direct their students back into the locker room (and scold Archie for pointing his camcorder at the scene), while a mutual friend of Archie and Corey cries out and tries in vain to lift Corey's body down, later blaming Archie for Corey's death and punching Archie in the stomach on school grounds. Sierra drives away from the school in her car, and Archie jumps in her passenger seat. While driving, she reveals that her brother Shane fatally crashed his car on purpose, that she kept Shane's suicide note to her while their parents burned theirs, and that their parents have been falsely telling her that his death was an accident ever since. She nearly crashes the car with both of them in it, but changes her mind at the last minute. However, Sierra dumps Archie for reneging on their suicide pact. When Archie returns home, he finds his parents searching his studio again and they interrogate him about Corey's suicide. In an attempt to level with him, they admit that Archie was an unplanned pregnancy. Once he has his studio to himself, Archie discovers that Corey borrowed Archie's camera on the night of the party to record a suicide note addressed to Archie.

Archie drives to Los Angeles to clear his head, and rings the doorbell of filmmaker Jesse Gabriel Vargas's modest house in Boyle Heights. Vargas himself returns from a walk and invites Archie in, reassuring him that he's not alone in feeling directionless and suicidal. They later walk through Skid Row together, where they see homeless people keeping each other company, listening to a street preacher, and helping each other forage for supplies. Vargas encourages Archie to find purpose in being considerate of other people, and metaphorically kill negative parts of his old self rather than commit suicide altogether. Once he is alone again, Archie still holds a gun to his head and considers suicide, but later throws the gun off a bridge. This is mixed with more footage from Corey's video suicide note, in which Corey encourages Archie to consider staying alive despite Corey himself losing his will to live. While he is still on the bridge, Archie gets a voicemail from Sierra in which she states that she is currently committing suicide by painkiller overdose. Archie calls 911 in hopes that they can reach Sierra in time, while also rushing over to Sierra's house in person. Archie rushes up to Sierra's room and cries over her body, believing her to be dead. Sierra's parents (Mariel Hemingway and Tim Halligan) run into her room and, at first glance, falsely assume Archie facilitated her suicide. Paramedics show up and narrowly manage to revive Sierra, thanks to Archie's early 911 call and knowledge of how many pills she took. Archie and Sierra later attend Corey's funeral, and Archie shares a freeform poem that Jesse Gabriel Vargas recorded about her during his visit. Contrary to a cliché happily-ever-after ending, Archie states that Sierra began dating someone else upon going to college, while Archie remains single and an avid filmmaker.

== Cast ==
- Gabriel Sunday as Archie Holden Buster Williams
- Brooke Nevin as Sierra Silver
- David Carradine as Jesse Gabriel Vargas
- Joe Mantegna as Gafur Chandrasakar
- Mariel Hemingway as Charlotte Silver
- Nora Dunn as Gretchen Williams
- Michael Welch as Earl
- Zachary Ray Sherman as Corey
- Tony Hale as Carmelo Peters
- Sandy Martin as Mrs. Ellis
- Kurtis Bedford as Mr. Bedford
- Tim Halligan as Coleman Silver
- Robert Kurcz as Daryl Williams
- Harry Shearer as Caress Moscowitz
- Vanessa Lengies as Mallory
- Steven Anthony Lawrence as Freud Boy
- Caker Folley as "party ho"
- Jennifer R Davis as Extra

Co-editor Jordan J. Miller appears as "Jordan Jah! The Titty Twistah", and co-writer and director David Lee Miller portrays a garbage scrounger. Co-writer Eric J. Adams and executive producer Karen Dean Tritts are credited as background players.

== I Am an Archie ==
I Am an Archie is a social media marketing campaign aiming to promote teen suicide awareness. After attending an early screening of Archie's Final Project, a Miami teenager created a video in which he identified as an Archie. Since then, thousands of teens have identified themselves as Archies.

When asked why the campaign resonated so well with teens, Gabriel Sunday said "I think the reason this whole IAmAnArchie campaign started is because kids in the festival circuit would be like, “Oh, that’s me. Archie is me.” There are so many ways you can connect with that character and kids always connect with him, no matter what place or what country they’re in. They feel that sh** that he’s going through, and they’re living it. So they started giving that feedback and saying "I’m an Archie because I’m depressed and I hate my family, or I’m creative and I love making art but people don’t understand it." I’ve been connected to the issue of suicide for six or seven years, and I know that what kids need to hear more than anything is that they’re not alone. That ended up being our message with IAmAnArchie: “Yeah, I’m scared, I’m depressed, I’m obsessed, I’m whatever, but I’m also an Archie because there’s a million Archies and they’re all going through crazy s***.”

Actor/director Adrian Grenier also has identified himself as being an Archie.

== Critical reception ==
Archie's Final Project currently holds a 57% approval rate on Rotten Tomatoes from 7 critic reviews.

== Awards ==
- Crystal Bear Best Picture Generation 14plus — Berlin International Film Festival 2009
- Grand Jury Award for Best Feature — GenArt Film Festival 2009
- Audience Award for Best Feature — GenArt Film Festival 2009
- Jury Grand Prix for Best Picture — Giffoni Film Festival 2009
- Special Jury Grand Prix, Golden Gryphon for Best Picture — Giffoni Film Festival 2009
- Audience Award for Best Picture — Giffoni Film Festival 2009
- MyMovies Award for Best Picture — Giffoni Film Festival 2009
- Outstanding Achievement in Filmmaking — Newport Beach Film Festival 2009
- Youth Jury Award for Best FutureWave Feature — Seattle International Film Festival 2009
- Grand Jury Prize for Best Dramatic Feature — Edmonton International Film Festival 2009
- Peoples Choice Award for Best Feature Film — Edmonton International Film Festival 2009
- Best Film — Buster International Film Festival 2009
- Jury Award for Best International Feature — Raindance Film Festival 2009
- The Camerio International Jury Award for Best Feature Film — Carrousel international du film de Rimouski 2009
- Grand Youth Jury Award for Best Feature Film — Exground Filmfest, Weisbaden, Germany 2009
- Best Editing (Gabriel Sunday) — Downtown LA Film Festival 2009
