= David Lee Miller (director) =

American film director

David Lee Miller is an American film director, screenwriter, composer and producer. He is best known for writing, producing and directing the award-winning teen comedy-drama film Archie's Final Project, also known as My Suicide.

Miller also co-authored the children's picture book The Cat Who Lived with Anne Frank.

== Early life ==
Miller was born in the city of Milwaukee, Wisconsin. He grew up playing blues piano in the Milwaukee-Chicago area. He is a graduate of Stanford University's film and journalism programs, and Princeton University's creative writing program.

== Career ==
A Writers Guild of America member, Miller wrote for the Fox/Marvel's Spider-Man: The Animated Series in 1995, directed and scored one of the first home video releases Zoo-opolis!, and wrote the Simon & Schuster picture storybooks Baby and The Goonies.

Miller directed one of the first widely released CD-ROMs, The Voyager Company's Mozart: The Dissonant Quartet. In 1991, Miller was the Head of the Criterion Collection, creating the first interactive documentaries on laserdisc which became known as Special Editions. He also created some of the first kids’ computer games, including Zoo Explorers, Ocean Explorers, Bug Explorers and Dinosaur Explorers. He also produced, directed, wrote and scored MGM’s All Dogs Go To Heaven Activity Center.

Miller wrote, produced and directed the sci-fi comedy horror movie, Breakfast of Aliens.

Miller co-founded Regenerate, a by youth-for-youth nonprofit media organization dedicated to saving young lives through youth arts empowerment.

Miller received an audience with Pope Benedict XVI in the Sistine Chapel at the Vatican's historic The Meeting with Artists on November 21, 2009, on the 45th anniversary of a similar event that took place with Pope Paul VI.

== Awards ==
Year	Nominee / work	Award	Result
2009	My Suicide	Crystal Bear Best Picture Generation 14plus — Berlin International Film Festival	Won
2009	My Suicide	Grand Jury Award for Best Feature — GenArt Film Festival	Won
2009	My Suicide	Audience Award for Best Feature — GenArt Film Festival	Won
2009	My Suicide	Jury Grand Prix for Best Picture — Giffoni Film Festival 2009	Won
2009	My Suicide	Special Jury Grand Prix, Golden Gryphon for Best Picture — Giffoni Film Festival	Won
2009	My Suicide	Audience Award for Best Picture — Giffoni Film Festival	Won
2009	My Suicide	MyMovies Award for Best Picture — Giffoni Film Festival	Won
2009	My Suicide	Outstanding Achievement in Filmmaking — Newport Beach Film Festival	Won
2009	My Suicide	Youth Jury Award for Best FutureWave Feature — Seattle International Film Festival 2009	Won
2009	My Suicide	Grand Jury Prize for Best Dramatic Feature — Edmonton International Film Festival 2009	Won
2009	My Suicide	Peoples Choice Award for Best Feature Film — Edmonton International Film Festival	Won
2009	My Suicide	Best Film — Buster International Film Festival	Won
2009	My Suicide	Jury Award for Best International Feature — Raindance Film Festival	Won
2009	My Suicide	The Camerio International Jury Award for Best Feature Film — Carrousel international du film de Rimouski 2009	Won
2009	My Suicide	Grand Youth Jury Award for Best Feature Film — Exground Filmfest, Weisbaden, Germany	Won
