= Neil Sedaka discography =

Recordings by American singer-songwriter

- Studio albums: 26

The following is a comprehensive discography of the American singer Neil Sedaka.

== Original studio albums ==
=== 1950s ===
- 1959: Rock with Sedaka (titled Neil Sedaka in some territories)

=== 1960s ===
- 1961: Circulate (10 of the 12 songs are covers of 1930s-1950s standards; released in Japan under the title Look To The Rainbow)
- 1961: Neil Sedaka Sings Little Devil and His Other Hits
- 1963: 3 Great Guys (with Paul Anka and Sam Cooke)
- 1969: Workin' on a Groovy Thing (released in the UK as Sounds of Sedaka)

=== 1970s ===
- 1971: Emergence
- 1972: Solitaire (titled Neil Sedaka in some territories)
- 1973: The Tra-La Days Are Over
- 1974: Laughter In The Rain
- 1974: Sedaka's Back (US)
- 1975: Overnight Success (titled The Hungry Years in the US and other territories)
- 1976: Steppin' Out
- 1977: A Song
- 1978: All You Need Is the Music

=== 1980s ===
- 1980: In the Pocket
- 1981: Neil Sedaka: Now
- 1983: Come See About Me
- 1986: The Good Times

=== 1990s ===
- 1991/1995: Tuneweaver
- 1995: Classically Sedaka
- 1998: Tales of Love (and Other Passions)

=== 2000s ===
- 2003: Brighton Beach Memories — Neil Sedaka Sings Yiddish
- 2005: The Miracle of Christmas (2-CD set)
- 2009: Waking Up Is Hard to Do (children's recording)

=== 2010s ===
- 2010: The Music of My Life
- 2016: I Do It for Applause

== Compilations, live albums and foreign-language albums ==
=== 1960s ===
- 1962: Neil Sedaka Sings His Greatest Hits (also known as Greatest Hits 1959–63)
- 1963: Nuestro Amigo Neil Sedaka Canta En Español (in Spanish)
- 1964: Más Neil Sedaka En Español (in Spanish)
- 1964: Neil Sedaka: Italiano (in Italian)
- 1965: Sedaka Italiano Volume 2 (in Italian)
- 1966: Smile (in Italian)
- 1966: My Yiddishe Momme: Neil Sedaka at Chequers

=== 1970s ===
- 1970: Oh! Carol
- 1974: Live at the Royal Festival Hall (UK; live)
- 1974: Oh Carol
- 1974: On Stage (issued in the US in 1976 as Live in Australia & in Brazil as Ao Vivo)
- 1975: All-Time Greatest Hits
- 1975: Pop Power: The Fantastic Neil Sedaka
- 1976: Let's Go Steady Again
- 1976: Pure Gold
- 1976: Sedaka Live in Australia at the South Sydney Junior Leagues Club
- 1976: Breaking Up Is Hard to Do: The Original Hit
- 1976: Stupid Cupid (RCA Camden album)
- 1976: Laughter and Tears: The Best of Neil Sedaka Today
- 1977: Neil Sedaka's Greatest Hits
- 1977: Neil Sedaka and Songs — A Solo Concert (live 2-LP)
- 1977: Neil Sedaka and Songs
- 1977: Neil Sedaka: The '50s and '60s
- 1997: Neil Sedaka: 14 Knockouts
- 1978: The Many Sides of Neil Sedaka
- 1979: Let's Go Steady Again
- 1979: Sunny

=== 1980s ===
- 1980: Neil Sedaka's Greatest Hits
- 1982: Is Anybody Gonna Miss You?
- 1982: Sedaka Live at Sun City (South African release of the "On Stage album from 1974)
- 1986: My Friend
- 1988: All-Time Greatest Hits

=== 1990s ===
- 1991: All Time Greatest Hits, Vol. 2
- 1991: Timeless — The Very Best of Neil Sedaka
- 1991: The Collection
- 1991: Neil Sedaka's Diary
- 1992: Greatest Hits Live
- 1992: Love Will Keep Us Together
- 1992: Tuneweaver
- 1994: Laughter in the Rain: The Best of Neil Sedaka, 1974–1980
- 1994: A Personal Collection
- 1994: The Singer & His Songs
- 1995: Song Cycle (songs culled from "Emergence" [1971] and "Solitaire" [1972])
- 1995: I Successi Di Neil Sedaka (compilation of Italian-language recordings)
- 1996: Neil Sedaka By Popular Demand
- 1996: Neil Sedaka in Italiano (2-CD edition of his 1960s Italian recordings)
- 1997: What a Difference a Day Makes: The Neil Sedaka Collection
- 1999: The Very Best of Neil Sedaka (2-CD set)

=== 2000s ===
- 2001: RCA 100th Anniversary Series: The Very Best Of Neil Sedaka
- 2002: Let the Good Times In
- 2003: Oh Carol: The Complete Recordings, 1955–66 (8-CD box with previously unreleased material)
- 2003: Neil Sedaka: The Brooklyn Demos, 1958-61
- 2003: Platinum and Gold Collection
- 2003: The Show Goes On
- 2004: Stairway to Heaven: The Best of Neil Sedaka
- 2005: Love Songs
- 2006: The Very Best of Neil Sedaka: The Show Goes On (2-CD)
- 2006: Neil Sedaka Live at the Royal Albert Hall – The Very Best of Neil Sedaka: The Show Goes On (2 DVD set filmed 7 April 2006 in London)
- 2007: The Definitive Collection (2-CD)
- 2007: Oh! Carol
- 2009: Flashback (compilation of Italian recordings)
- 2009: Waking Up Is Hard to Do
- 2009: The Miracle of Christmas: The Deluxe Edition

=== 2010s and 2020s ===
- 2010: The Music of My Life
- 2010: Neil Sedaka Sings Little Devil and His Other Hits / The Many Sides of Neil Sedaka (a combo re-release of his 1961 and 1978 albums as listed above)
- 2010: Neil Sedaka
- 2011: "Oh! Carol" and All the Early Classics
- 2011: I Must Be Dreaming
- 2011: The Sedaka Sessions
- 2011: Where the Boys Are: The Music of Neil Sedaka and Howard Greenfield
- 2012: Neil Sedaka: Hit Maker
- 2013: The Things I Love
- 2013: The Essential Early Recordings (2-CD set)
- 2013: The Drugstore's Rockin'
- 2013: Neil Sedaka in the Studio, 1958-1962
- 2013: Neil Sedaka Live at the Royal Albert Hall
- 2014: Neil Sedaka: Hits Around the World
- 2014: Neil Sedaka in the Studio, 1958-1962, Vol. 2
- 2014: The Complete Singles and EPs: As and Bs, 1956-1962
- 2014: Neil Sedaka Songbook (2-CD set)
- 2016: Greatest Hits
- 2022: All You Need Is The Music: The Elektra Years (1977–1981) (2-CD album containing complete contents of Sedaka's four Elektra albums - A Song [1977], All You Need Is the Music [1978], In the Pocket [1980], and Neil Sedaka: Now [1981])

== EPs ==
Year	Title	Side 1 content	Side 2 content	Notes
1959	I Go Ape!	(1) "I Go Ape!" & (2) "All I Need Is You"	(3) "(Stop!) You're Knocking Me Out!" & (4) "I Belong to You"	
1959	Oh, Carol!	(1) "Oh, Carol!" & (2) "Going Home to Mary Lou"	(3) "The Girl for Me" & (4) "I Ain't Hurtin' No More"	
1961	Little Devil	(1) "Little Devil" & (2) "Circulate"	(3) "Calendar Girl" & (4) "We Kiss in a Shadow"	An RCA 33 RPM "compact double"
1961	Neil's Best	(1) "Oh, Carol!" & (2) "Stairway to Heaven"	(3) "Run Samson Run" & (4) "The Diary"	An RCA 33 RPM "compact double"
1962	Breaking Up Is Hard to Do	(1) "Breaking Up Is Hard to Do" & (2) "What Am I Gonna Do"	(3) "All I Need Is You" & (4) "I Waited Too Long"	Released in France
1963	Alice in Wonderland	(1) "Alice in Wonderland" & (2) "Sweet Little You"	(3) "Next Door to an Angel" & (4) "I Found My World in You"	Released in France
1966	Neil Sedaka in Hebrew and English	(1) "Oh, Carol!" (Hebrew) & (2) "You Mean Everything to Me" (Hebrew)	(3) "Waiting for Never (La Terza Luna)" & (4) "Too Late"	Released in Israel
1966	My Yiddishe Momme	(1) "My Yiddishe Momme"	(2) "Israeli Medley: (a) "Shalom Aleichem", (b) "Artza Aleinu", (c) "Tzena, Tzena, Tzena"; & (3) "Scapriaticciello"	Released in Australia
1969	Star-Crossed Lovers	(1) "Star-Crossed Lovers" & (2) "Rainy Jane"	(3) "Jeannine" & (4) "We Had a Good Thing Going"	Released in Australia on the Atlantic label
1976	Make Your Own Sunshine	(1) "You've Gotta Make Your Own Sunshine" & (2) "New York City Blues"	(3) "Summer Nights" & (4) "Tit for Tat"	Released in UK; 33 RPM EP

== English-language singles ==
=== 1950s ===
Year	Title	Peak chart positions						
Year	Title	US Pop	US R&B	CAN	ITA	NLD	NOR	UK
1956	"While I Dream" (Melba 104 c/w I Love My Baby)	―	―	―	―	―	―	―
1957	"Laura Lee" (De 30 520 c/w Snowtime)	―	―	―	―	―	―	―
1957	"Ring-a-Rockin'" (Legion 133 c/w Fly Don't Fly On Me)	―	―	―	―	―	―	―
1958	"Oh Delilah!" (Pyramid 623 c/w Neil's Twist)	―	―	―	―	―	―	―
1958	"The Diary" (47-7408 c/w No Vacancy)	14	25	15	―	―	―	―
1958	"I Go Ape" (47-7473 c/w Moon of Gold)	42	―	23	―	―	―	9
1959	"(Stop!) You're Knocking Me Out!" (in Greece c/w I Waited Too Long)	―	―	―	―	―	―	―
1959	"Crying My Heart Out for You" (47-7530 c/w You Gotta Learn Your Rhythm And Blues)	111	―	―	6	―	―	―
1959	"Stupid Cupid" (in Italy c/w As Long As I Live)	―	―	―	―	―	―	―
1959	"All I Need Is You" (in Italy c/w Fallin')	―	―	―	―	―	―	―
1959	"Oh! Carol" (7595 c/w One Way Ticket)	9	27	4	1	1	9	3
1959	"The Girl for Me" (in Italy c/w Going Home to Mary Lou)	―	―	―	―	―	―	―
1959	"Going Home to Mary Lou" (9401 c/w What Am I Gonna Do)	―	―	―	―	―	―	―
1959	"I Ain't Hurtin' No More" (in Greece c/w Another Sleepless Night)	―	―	―	―	―	―	―
"—" denotes releases that did not chart or were not released in that territory.

=== 1960s ===
Year	Title	Peak chart positions					
Year	Title	US Pop	US R&B	CAN	NLD	NOR	UK
1960	"Stairway to Heaven" (7709 c/w Forty Winks Away)	9	―	16	18	―	8
1960	"You Mean Everything to Me" / "Run Samson Run" (7781)	17; 28	― —	2; 2	― —	― —	45 —
1961	"Calendar Girl" (7829 c/w The Same Old Fool)	4	22	1	11	―	8
1961	"Little Devil" (7874 c/w I Must Be Dreaming)	11	―	2	―	―	9
1961	"Sweet Little You" (7922 c/w I Found My World In You)	59	―	―	―	―	―
1961	"Happy Birthday Sweet Sixteen" (7957 c/w Don't Lead Me On)	6	―	5	―	8	3
1962	"King of Clowns" (8007 c/w Walk With Me)	45	―	―	―	―	23
1962	"Oh, Delilah!" (with the Marvels) (in UK c/w Neil's Twist)	―	―	―	―	―	―
1962	"Breaking Up Is Hard to Do" (8046 c/w As Long As I Live, rec. in 1959)	1	12	1	―	―	7
1962	"Next Door to an Angel" (8086 c/w I Belong To You, rec. in 1959)	5	19	5	―	―	29
1963	"Alice in Wonderland" (47-8137 c/w Circulate, rec. in 1960)	17	―	21	―	―	―
1963	"Let's Go Steady Again" (47-8169 c/w Waiting For Never)	26	21	15	―	―	42
1963	"The Dreamer" (8209 c/w Look Inside Your Heart)	47	―	31	―	―	―
1963	"Bad Girl" (8254 c/w Wait 'Til You See My Baby)	33	―	―	―	―	―
1964	"This Endless Night" (in Puerto Rico c/w Too Late)	―	―	―	―	―	―
1964	"The Closest Thing to Heaven" (8341 c/w Without A Song)	107	―	―	―	―	―
1964	"Sunny" (8382 c/w She'll Never Be You)	86	―	―	―	―	―
1964	"I Hope He Breaks Your Heart" (8453 c/w Too Late)	104	―	―	―	―	―
1964	"Let the People Talk" (8511 c/w In The Chapel With You)	107	―	―	―	―	―
1965	"The World Through a Tear" (8637 c/w High On A Mountain)	76	―	―	―	―	―
1965	"The Answer to My Prayer" (8737 c/w Blue Boy)	89	―	―	―	―	―
1966	"The Answer Lies Within" (8844 c/w Grown-Up Games)	―	―	―	―	―	―
1966	"We Can Make It If We Try" (9004 c/w Too Late, same as 8453)	121	―	―	―	―	―
1969	"Star-Crossed Lovers"	―	―	48	―	―	―
1969	"Rainy Jane"	―	―	―	―	―	―
1969	"Ebony Angel"	―	―	―	―	―	―
1969	"Wheeling, West Virginia"	―	―	―	―	―	―
"—" denotes releases that did not chart or were not released in that territory.

=== 1970s ===
Year	Title	No.	Peak chart positions						
Year	Title	No.	US Pop	US AC	AUS	CAN	CAN AC	NZ	UK
1971	"My World Keeps Getting Smaller Every Day" (Australia only)		―	―	―	―	―	―	―
1971	"I'm a Song (Sing Me)" (c/w Silent Movies)	63-5017 RCA2167	―	―	―	―	―	―	―
1971	"Superbird" (c/w Rosemary Blue)	63-5020 RCA2215	―	―	―	―	―	―	―
1972	"Beautiful You" (c/w Anywhere You're Gonna Be (Leba's Song))	63-5024 RCA2269	―	―	―	―	―	―	43
1972	"That's When the Music Takes Me" (c/w Don't Let It Mess Your Mind)	RCA2310	27	7	―	16	―	―	18
1972	"Dimbo Man" (c/w Trying To Say Goodbye)	RCA2366	―	―	―	―	―	―	―
1973	"Standing on the Inside" (c/w Let Daddy Know)	MGM2006-267	―	―	40	―	―	―	26
1973	"Suspicions"		―	―	―	―	―	―	―
1973	"Our Last Song Together"		―	―	―	―	―	―	31
1973	"Love Will Keep Us Together"		―	―	―	―	―	―	―
1974	"A Little Lovin'"		―	―	―	―	―	―	34
1974	"Going Nowhere"		―	―	―	―	―	―	―
1974	"Laughter in the Rain"		1	1	―	2	―	―	15
1975	"The Immigrant"		22	1	―	9	―	17	―
1975	"The Queen of 1964"		―	―	―	―	―	15	35
1975	"Bad Blood" (with uncredited backing vocals by Elton John)		1	25	11	4	―	―	―
1975	"New York City Blues"		―	―	―	―	―	―	―
1975	"Breaking Up Is Hard to Do" (slow ballad version)		8	1	―	1	―	―	―
1976	"Love in the Shadows"		16	4	―	18	―	20	―
1976	"Steppin' Out" (with uncredited backing vocals by Elton John)		36	45	―	29	―	35	―
1976	"No. 1 with a Heartache"		―	―	―	―	―	17	―
1976	"You Gotta Make Your Own Sunshine"		53	7	―	37	―	―	―
1977	"Amarillo"		44	4	―	54	―	―	―
1977	"Alone at Last"		104	17	―	―	10	―	―
1977	"You Never Done It Like That"		―	―	―	―	―	―	―
1978	"All You Need Is the Music"		―	―	―	―	―	―	―
1978	"Love Keeps Getting Stronger Every Day"		―	―	―	―	―	―	―
1978	"Sad, Sad Story"		―	―	―	―	―	―	―
1978	"Blue Boy"		―	―	―	―	―	―	―
"—" denotes releases that did not chart or were not released in that territory.

=== 1980s to 1990s ===
Year	Title	Peak chart positions			
Year	Title	US Pop	US AC	CAN	AUS
1980	"Should've Never Let You Go" (with Dara Sedaka)	19	3	56	69
1980	"Letting Go"	107	―	―	―
1981	"My World Keeps Slipping Away"	―	36	―	―
1981	"Losing You"	―	―	―	―
1984	"New Orleans" (with Gary U.S. Bonds)	―	―	―	―
1984	"Rhythm of the Rain"	―	37	―	―
1984	"Your Precious Love" (with Dara Sedaka)	―	16	―	―
1986	"The Good Times"	―	―	―	―
1991	"Laughter in the Rain" (New version; with Dara Sedaka)	―	―	―	―
1991	"Love Will Keep Us Together" (New version; UK only)	―	―	―	―
1992	"Desiree"	―	―	―	―
"—" denotes releases that did not chart or were not released in that territory.

== Foreign-language singles ==
=== In Italian ===
All singles were released on the RCA Victor label except for "L'Addio"/"Passo E Chiudo" which was released on the Atlantic label.

Year	Title	Notes
1961	"Esagerata" ("Little Devil")	b/w "Un giorno inutile" ("I Must Be Dreaming")
1962	"Tu non lo sai" ("Breaking Up Is Hard to Do")	b/w "Finché vivrò" ("As Long As I Live")
1963	"La terza luna" ("Waiting for Never")	#1-ranked hit in Italy in April 1963; b/w "Il re dei pagliacci" ("King of Clowns")
1963	"I tuoi capricci" ("Look Inside Your Heart")	b/w "Non cercare un'altra bocca" ("Walk with Me")
1963	"Adesso no"	b/w "Quando sorridi così"
1964	"La notte è fatta per amare" ("Another Day, Another Heartache")	b/w "La forza del destino"
1964	"La luna a fiori"	b/w "Ricordati ancora"
1965	"Non basta mai"	b/w "Darei 10 anni"
1965	"E la vita continua"	b/w "Sarà sarà"
1966	"Lettera bruciata" ("A Lover's Concerto")	b/w "L'ultima foglia"
1969	"L'addio" ("Star-Crossed Lovers")	b/w "Passo e chiudo" ("We Had a Good Thing Goin'")

=== In German ===
All singles were released on the RCA label.

Year	Title	Notes
1961	"Crazy Daisy" ("Little Devil")	b/w "Heute Sind Es Träume" ("I Must Be Dreaming")
1962	"Nur Ein Bild Von Dir" ("Pictures from the Past")	b/w "Wenn Ich In Dein Fenster Seh" ("On the Outside Looking In")
1963	"Candy (Madchen Aus Old Germany)"	b/w "So Wie Mein Baby" ("Wait 'Til You See My Baby")

=== In other languages ===
Year	Title	Language	B-side	Label
1964	"Manuela" §	Spanish	"Lunita Consejera" §	RCA Victor
1965	"Namida No Komichi" ("The World Through a Tear")	Japanese	"High on a Mountain" (Japanese)	Victor (JVC)
1965	"Oh, Carol!" (Hebrew)	Hebrew	"You Mean Everything to Me" (Hebrew)	RCA Victor
1969	"Amour Perdu" (Star-Crossed Lovers)	Canadian French	"Oui, Nous Serons Des Copains" ("We Had a Good Thing Goin'")	Atlantic (Quebec)

§ - "Manuela" and "Lunita Consejera" were derived from the 1964 Italian-Argentine film Il Gaucho.
