= Laughter in the Rain: The Best of Neil Sedaka, 1974–1980 =

Greatest hits album by Neil Sedaka
- Released: 1994
- Genre: Pop
- Label: Varèse Sarabande

Neil Sedaka chronology
Love Will Keep Us Together (1993)	Laughter in the Rain: The Best of Neil Sedaka, 1974–1980 (1994)	Song Cycle (1995)

Laughter in the Rain: The Best of Neil Sedaka, 1974–1980 is a compilation album containing the works of American pop singer Neil Sedaka. The album is composed mostly of material from his tenure with The Rocket Record Company in the mid-1970s. The title of this album is something of a misnomer, as it contains some material recorded prior to 1974. The album was released on compact disc in the US by Varèse Sarabande in 1994.

== Program ==
No.	Title	Length
1.	"Laughter in the Rain" (1974)
2.	"Love Will Keep Us Together" (1973–74)
3.	"That's When the Music Takes Me" (1972–74)
4.	"The Immigrant" (1974)
5.	"The Hungry Years" (1975)
6.	"The Queen of 1964"" (1975*)
7.	"Rock-N-Roll Wedding Day" (1973)
8.	"Bad Blood" (1975, w/ Elton John)
9.	"Breaking Up Is Hard to Do" (1975)
10.	"No. 1 with a Heartache" (1976)
11.	"Lonely Night"/"Angel Face" (1975)
12.	"Standing on the Inside" (1973–74)
13.	"Love in the Shadows" (1976)
14.	"The Other Side of Me" (1973–74)
15.	"Steppin' Out" (1976, w/ Elton John)
16.	"You Gotta Make Your Own Sunshine" (1976)
17.	"Little Brother" (1973–74)
18.	"Solitaire" (1972–74)
19.	"Should've Never Let You Go" (1980, w/ Dara Sedaka)
20.	"Our Last Song Together" (1973–74)

== Notes ==
- Tracks 1 and 4 were originally heard on the UK album Laughter in the Rain and were incorporated into the US album Sedaka's Back in 1974.
- Tracks 2, 12, 14, 17 and 20 were originally heard on the UK album The Tra-La Days Are Over and were incorporated into the US album "Sedaka's Back" in 1974. However, the version of Track 12 heard here is the 45 rpm version; the LP version is slightly longer with a different-sounding bridge.
- Tracks 3 and 18 were originally heard on the UK album Solitaire in 1972 and were incorporated into the US album "Sedaka's Back" in 1974.
- Tracks 5, 8, 9, and 11 were originally heard on the UK album Overnight Success and its US counterpart The Hungry Years.
- Track 6 was a radio edited version of a song from the UK album Overnight Success; the lyrics in the album version were deemed too racy for airplay and were edited. This album marks its first release in the US.
- Track 7 was originally heard on the UK album The Tra-La Days Are Over, but, like Track 6, was not issued in the US until the release of this album.
- Tracks 10, 13, 15 and 16 were heard on the album Steppin' Out.
- Track 19 was a duet with Neil and his then-teenaged daughter Dara. It was heard on the 1980 Elektra album In the Pocket and is the only song from Sedaka's years with Elektra Records to be featured in this compilation. It was a remake of a song Sedaka recorded solo in 1978 as "Should've Never Let Her Go" for the album All You Need Is the Music
