= My Friend (Neil Sedaka album) =

Compilation album by Neil Sedaka
- Released: 1986
- Genre: Pop
- Label: Polydor

Neil Sedaka chronology
| The Good Times (1986) | My Friend (1986) | All Time Greatest Hits (1988) |

My Friend is a 1986 compilation album containing the works of American pop star Neil Sedaka. It was dedicated to Sedaka's lifelong friend and songwriting partner, Howard Greenfield, who died of AIDS-related complications that year. The album was issued on the Polydor label.

== Track listing ==
1. "You Gotta Make Your Own Sunshine" (1976)
2. "Bad Blood" (1975)
3. "Letting Go" (1980)
4. "The Hungry Years" (1975)
5. "Lonely Night (Angel Face)" (1975)
6. "Laughter in the Rain" (1974)
7. "That's When the Music Takes Me" (1972)
8. "The Immigrant" (1974)
9. "You're So Good for Me" (1980)
10. "My Friend" (1980)
11. "Love in the Shadows" (1976)
12. "Should've Never Let You Go" (1980)
13. "Solitaire" (1972)
14. "#1 With a Heartache" (1976)
15. "Love Will Keep Us Together" (1973)
16. "Breaking Up is Hard to Do" (slow version; 1975)
