= Neil Sedaka's Greatest Hits (1977 album) =

Greatest hits album by Neil Sedaka
- Released: 1977
- Genre: Pop
- Label: The Rocket Record Company, Polydor

Neil Sedaka chronology
Laughter and Tears: The Best of Neil Sedaka Today (1976)	Neil Sedaka's Greatest Hits (1977)	Neil Sedaka and Songs — A Solo Concert (1977)

Neil Sedaka's Greatest Hits is a 1977 compilation album consisting of the works of American pop star Neil Sedaka. It contains his most popular songs from his trilogy of Rocket albums from 1974-1976. It was released by The Rocket Record Company in the US; outside the US it was released on the Polydor label.

== Track listing ==
=== Side one ===
1. Laughter in the Rain
2. Standing on the Inside
3. The Immigrant
4. Love Will Keep Us Together
5. The Hungry Years
6. That's When the Music Takes Me

=== Side two ===
7. Bad Blood
8. Lonely Night (Angel Face)
9. Love in the Shadows
10. Solitaire
11. Steppin' Out
12. Breaking Up Is Hard to Do (1975 version)
