= Neil Sedaka's Greatest Hits (RCA International album) =

Greatest hits album by Neil Sedaka
- Released: 1980
- Genre: Pop
- Label: RCA International

Neil Sedaka chronology
In the Pocket (1980)	Neil Sedaka's Greatest Hits (1980)	Neil Sedaka: Now (1981)

Neil Sedaka's Greatest Hits is a compilation album containing the works of the American pop singer Neil Sedaka. It was originally released in the UK and Western Europe in 1980 on the RCA International label. It was issued again on CD ten years later in 1990. The album contains songs that Neil Sedaka recorded with RCA Records from 1959 to 1963.

This album is NOT to be confused with the 1977 Rocket/Polydor album of the same name, which contains Sedaka's big hits from the mid-1970s.

== Track listing ==
=== Side A ===
1. "I Go Ape"
2. "Oh! Carol"
3. "Stairway To Heaven"
4. "Run Samson Run"
5. "You Mean Everything To Me"
6. "Calendar Girl"
7. "I Must Be Dreaming"

=== Side B ===
1. "Little Devil"
2. "Happy Birthday Sweet Sixteen"
3. "King of Clowns"
4. "As Long As I Live"
5. "Breaking Up Is Hard To Do"
6. "Next Door To An Angel"
7. "Let's Go Steady Again"
