= Neil Sedaka's Greatest Hits =

Neil Sedaka's Greatest Hits may refer to:

- Neil Sedaka's Greatest Hits (1977 album)
- Neil Sedaka's Greatest Hits (RCA International album), 1980

== See also ==
- Neil Sedaka Sings His Greatest Hits
- Neil Sedaka: All Time Greatest Hits, Volume 2
