= Sunny (Neil Sedaka album) =

Compilation album by Neil Sedaka
- Released: 1979
- Genre: Pop
- Label: RCA Camden

Neil Sedaka chronology
Let's Go Steady Again (1979)	Sunny (1979)	In the Pocket (1980)

Sunny is a 1979 compilation album containing the works of American pop singer Neil Sedaka. It features some of Sedaka's works from 1958–1964, during his affiliation with the RCA studios. It was released in the UK and throughout Western Europe on the RCA Camden label.

== Track listing ==
=== Side 1 ===
1. "Run Samson Run" (1960; ranked #28 on Billboard charts; double A-side with You Mean Everything to Me)
2. "Don't Lead Me On" (1961; B-side of Happy Birthday Sweet Sixteen)
3. "I Must Be Dreaming" (1961; B-side of Little Devil)
4. "The Same Old Fool" (1960-61; B-side of Calendar Girl)
5. "The Girl For Me" (1959; did not chart)
6. "Going Home To Mary Lou" (1959; did not chart)

=== Side 2 ===
7. "The Diary" (1958; ranked #14 on Billboard charts)
8. "Smile" (1961; originally recorded for the Circulate album)
9. "Another Sleepless Night" (1959; originally recorded for the album Rock with Sedaka)
10. "Sunny" (1964; ranked #86 on Billboard Hot 100)
11. "I Hope He Breaks Your Heart" (1964; ranked #104 on Billboard charts)
12. "Alice In Wonderland" (1963, ranked #17 on Billboard charts)
