= Oh Carol (1970 album) =

Compilation album by Neil Sedaka
- Released: 1970
- Genre: Pop
- Label: RCA Records

Neil Sedaka chronology
Workin' on a Groovy Thing (1969)	Oh Carol (1970)	Emergence (1971)

Oh Carol is a 1970 compilation album consisting of some of the best-known works of American pop singer Neil Sedaka. It was released in Great Britain and throughout Europe by RCA Records.

== Track listing ==
Side one

1. "Oh Carol!"
2. "Next Door to an Angel"
3. "King of Clowns"
4. "Happy Birthday Sweet Sixteen"
5. "Stairway to Heaven"
6. "Breaking Up Is Hard to Do"

Side two

1. "One-Way Ticket (To The Blues)"
2. "Calendar Girl"
3. "Little Devil"
4. "Sweet Little You"
5. "Run Samson Run"
6. "You Mean Everything to Me"

== Other releases ==
In West Germany, this album was released on the RCA International label as part of a series of LPs, "Yesterday's Pop Scene".

In Italy, this album was released in 1975 on the RCA Lineatre label under the title "Neil Sedaka: Greatest Hits".
