= Love Songs (Neil Sedaka album) =

Compilation album by Neil Sedaka

Compilation album by Neil Sedaka
- Released: 2005
- Recorded: 1959–1964
- Genre: Pop
- Label: RCA, Legacy

Neil Sedaka chronology
Stairway to Heaven: The Best of Neil Sedaka (2004)	Love Songs (2005)	The Very Best of Neil Sedaka: The Show Goes On (2006)

Love Songs is a 2005 compilation album containing the works of the American pop singer Neil Sedaka. It contains many of Sedaka's works from his years with RCA Victor from 1958 to 1964. Some of the tracks on the CD had never before been released. "Love Songs" was jointly issued by RCA and Legacy Records.

== Track listing ==
1. "Without a Song" (1964)
2. "You Mean Everything to Me" (1960)
3. "Breaking Up Is Hard to Do" (1962)
4. "As Long as I Live" (1959)
5. "Walk with Me" (1960)
6. "We Kiss in a Shadow" (1961)
7. "I Must Be Dreaming" (1961)
8. "I Found My World in You" (1961)
9. "Oh, Carol! (1959)
10. "All the Way" (1961)
11. "Because of You" (1964)*
12. "Another Sleepless Night" (1959)
13. "One-Way Ticket to the Blues" (1959)
14. "I'll Be Seeing You" (1964)*

An asterisk indicates a recording that had not been released before 2005.

== Critical reception ==
Critic Tim Sedra, of Allmusic, gave the compilation a 3.5* score, highlighting that several of the tracks are not in fact love songs, but that the album is a "nice collection" from an "under-rated" artist.
