= Neil Sedaka: 14 Knockouts =

Compilation album by Neil Sedaka
- Released: 1977
- Genre: Pop
- Label: RCA Records

Neil Sedaka chronology
Neil Sedaka: The '50s and '60s (1977)	Neil Sedaka: 14 Knockouts (1977)	A Song (1977)

Neil Sedaka: 14 Knockouts is a West German-produced compilation album containing the works of American pop star Neil Sedaka. It was released in 1977 on the RCA International label.

== Track listing ==
=== Side One ===
- (1) I Go Ape (1959)
- (2) Bad Girl (1963)
- (3) The Dreamer (1963)
- (4) Forty Winks Away (1960)
- (5) Stupid Cupid (1959)
- (6) Moon Of Gold (1959)
- (7) Going Home To Mary Lou (1959)

=== Side Two ===
- (8) You're Knocking Me Out (1959)
- (9) The Diary (1958)
- (10) Let's Go Steady Again (1963)
- (11) I Belong To You (1959)
- (12) Too Late (1963)
- (13) I Hope He Breaks Your Heart (1964)
- (14) Sunny (1964)
