= Neil Sedaka: The '50s and '60s =

Compilation album by Neil Sedaka
- Released: 1977
- Genre: Pop
- Label: RCA Victor

Neil Sedaka chronology
Neil Sedaka and Songs (1977)	Neil Sedaka: The '50s and '60s (1977)	Neil Sedaka: 14 Knockouts (1977)

Neil Sedaka: The '50s and '60s is a compilation album containing some of the works of the American rock-and-pop singer Neil Sedaka. It features some songs he recorded during the period from 1959 to 1966, when he was under contract to RCA Victor Records. The album was released in 1977 on the RCA Victor label.

== Track listing ==
=== Side A ===
- (1) "Let's Go Steady Again" (1963)
- (2) "We Can Make It If We Try" (1966)
- (3) "All the Words in the World" (1962)
- (4) "Walk with Me" (1960; issued as the B-side of "King of Clowns" in 1962)
- (5) "Crying My Heart Out for You" (1959)
- (6) "The Dreamer" (1963)

=== Side B ===
- (7) "You Gotta Learn Your Rhythm and Blues" (1959, B-side of "Crying My Heart Out for You")
- (8) "I Hope He Breaks Your Heart" (1964)
- (9) "Let the People Talk" (1964)
- (10) "Nobody But You" (1965)
- (11) "Alice in Wonderland" (1963)
- (12) "Forty Winks Away" (1960, issued as the B-side of "Stairway to Heaven")

== Notes ==
- This album marked the first release of "All The Worlds In The World" and "Nobody But You", from 1962 and 1965, respectively. They were not released at the time of their original recording.
