= Rock with Sedaka =

1959 debut studio album by Neil Sedaka

Studio album by Neil Sedaka
- Released: April 1959
- Studio: RCA Victor, New York City
- Genre: Pop, rock and roll
- Label: RCA Victor
- Producer: Al Nevins

Neil Sedaka chronology
Rock with Sedaka (1959)	Circulate (1961)

Singles from Rock with Sedaka
- 1. "The Diary" Released: November 1958; 2. "I Go Ape" Released: February 1959; 3. "Oh! Carol" Released: September 1959

Rock with Neil Sedaka or just Neil Sedaka is the first major solo album of Neil Sedaka released in April 1959 after two 1958 albums under the titles Neil Sedaka and The Tokens and Neil Sedaka and The Tokens and Coins. The album was released by RCA Victor and was produced by Al Nevins. The album contains 12 songs, all of them co-written by Sedaka and his friend Howard Greenfield. Two of the songs became successful singles for Sedaka from the album, namely "The Diary", his debut single that was a hit, reaching No. 14 on the US Billboard charts, and "I Go Ape", a single that was relatively successful in the United States reaching No. 42, but did far better in the UK Singles Chart, making it up to No. 9 and his debut single in the United Kingdom.

== Track listing ==
All songs were composed by Neil Sedaka and Howard Greenfield.

1. "You're Knockin' Me Out"
2. "The Diary"
3. "I Ain't Hurtin' No More"
4. "Stupid Cupid"
5. "All I Need Is You"
6. "I Waited Too Long"
7. "Fallin'"
8. "Another Sleepless Night"
9. "I Go Ape"
10. "Moon of Gold"
11. "I Belong to You"
12. "As Long As I Live"

== Singles from the album ==
Singles from the album:

- 1958: "The Diary" (US #14)
- 1959: "I Go Ape" (US #42, UK #9)
- 1959: "All I Need Is You" (released in Italy on the RCA Italiana label)
- 1959: "Stupid Cupid" (released in Italy on the RCA Italiana label)
- 1959: "(Stop!) You're Knocking Me Out!" (released on a 45 rpm single in Australia and Greece)

"Stupid Cupid" and "Fallin'" became major hits for Connie Francis, and Jimmy Clanton made a hit out of "Another Sleepless Night".

Also, several B-sides were drawn from this album for Neil Sedaka's singles.

- "I Ain't Hurtin' No More" was the B-side of "The Girl For Me" later in 1959.
- "Moon of Gold" was the B-side of "I Go Ape!" in 1959.
- "Fallin'" was the B-side of the Italian release of "All I Need Is You" in 1959.
- "As Long As I Live" was the B-side of the Italian release of "Stupid Cupid" in 1959, and again was a B-side in 1962 for Sedaka's signature song "Breaking Up Is Hard To Do". That same year, Sedaka recorded an Italian-language version as "Finche' Vivro'".
- "I Belong To You" was the B-side of the Australian release of "(Stop!) You're Knocking Me Out!" in 1959 and was re-issued in 1962 as the B-side of "Next Door To An Angel".
- "I Waited Too Long" was the B-side of the Greek release of "You're Knocking Me Out" in 1959.

== Re-release ==
Neil Sedaka and Circulate

Studio album by Neil Sedaka
- Released: 1995
- Genre: Pop

In 1995, the album Rock with Sedaka was re-released on CD and also included the album Circulate.
