= Love in the Shadows =

Love in the Shadows may refer to:

- "Love in the Shadows" (E. G. Daily song)
- "Love in the Shadows" (Neil Sedaka song)
- "Love in the Shadows", a song from the Magnetic Fields album 69 Love Songs
- Love in the Shadows (film), a 1960 Mexican drama film
