= All You Need Is the Music =

Studio album by Neil Sedaka
- Released: 1978
- Genre: Pop, disco
- Label: Elektra, Polydor

Neil Sedaka chronology
Neil Sedaka: 14 Knockouts (1977)	All You Need Is the Music (1978)	The Many Sides of Neil Sedaka (1978)

All You Need Is the Music is a 1978 in-studio album containing the works of the American pop-singer Neil Sedaka. It was released in the US on Elektra Records, his second album for the company. Outside the United States it was released on the European-based Polydor label. It was conducted and arranged by Artie Butler and engineered by Ron Malo.

== Track listing ==
=== Side One ===
1. "All You Need Is the Music"
2. "Candy Kisses"
3. "Should've Never Let Her Go"
4. "Sad, Sad Story"
5. "Tillie The Twirler"

=== Side Two ===
1. "Love Keeps Getting Stronger Every Day"
2. "Born to Be Bad"
3. "What a Surprise"
4. "You Can Hear the Love"
5. "City Boy"

== Singles ==
The title track, "All You Need Is the Music" (a disco number that marked Sedaka reuniting with Howard Greenfield for the first time in several years), was released as a single, but it did not chart, nor did the follow-up "Sad, Sad Story" (b/w "Love Keeps Getting Stronger Every Day" in the UK and "Tillie the Twirler" in the US).

== Reissue ==
In November 2022, the album was officially reissued on CD and digital platforms.

== Trivia ==
Two years later, Sedaka would rework "Should've Never Let Her Go" into a duet with his daughter Dara under the title "Should've Never Let You Go" for the 1980 album In The Pocket; this duet version would be much more warmly received than the original version heard on this album.
