= Brighton Beach Memories — Neil Sedaka Sings Yiddish =

Studio album by Neil Sedaka
- Released: 2003

Neil Sedaka chronology
Tales of Love (and Other Passions) (1998)	Brighton Beach Memories — Neil Sedaka Sings Yiddish (2003)	The Miracle of Christmas (2005)

Brighton Beach Memories — Neil Sedaka Sings Yiddish is a 2003 album by Neil Sedaka for Sameach Music. Sedaka went on to perform the songs with the Klezmatics as a benefit for The National Yiddish Theater Folksbiene in 2004.

== Track listing ==
1. Vi Ahin Zol Ich Geyn
2. Shein Vi Di L'Vone
3. "My Yiddeshe Mamme"
4. Eishes Chayil
5. "Bei Mir Bist Du Shein"
6. Mein Shtetele Belz
7. "Tumbalalaika"
8. Sunrise, Sunset
9. "Ochi chyornye" (Dark Eyes (song))
10. "Exodus" main theme from the film
11. Ich Hob Dich Tzufil Lieb
12. Anniversary Song
13. Tzena Tzena Tzena
