= Overnight Success (Neil Sedaka album) =

Studio album by Neil Sedaka
- Released: 1975
- Genre: Pop
- Length: 41:45
- Label: Polydor (UK); Rainbow Records (Australia)
- Producer: Robert Appère, Neil Sedaka

Neil Sedaka chronology
Laughter in the Rain (1974)	Overnight Success (1975)	Steppin' Out (1976)

Overnight Success is a 1975 studio album by Neil Sedaka. It was released in the UK and throughout Europe on the Polydor label, and Australia on the Rainbow label. Later that same year, in the US, most of this album was issued under the title The Hungry Years, with two songs from the British album replaced on the American album.

“The Hungry Years”, one of Sedaka's most frequently requested non-single tracks, marked Sedaka's reunion with his long-time collaborator Howard Greenfield after having broken off their partnership in 1973. Sedaka and Greenfield would again work together more regularly in the late 1970s.

== Reception ==
“The Queen of 1964” reached #35 in the UK in March 1975. Captain & Tennille’s 1976 cover of “Lonely Night (Angel Face)” hit #3 on the Billboard Hot 100 and was certified gold. "Bad Blood", with uncredited backing vocals by Elton John, reached number one on the Billboard Hot 100 in 1975, and remained in that position for three weeks before being replaced by Elton John's single "Island Girl". It was the most successful individual commercial release in Sedaka's career.

== Personnel ==
Piano: Neil Sedaka
Guitar: Steve Cropper, Dean Parks
Bass: Leland Sklar
Drums: Nigel Olsson
Percussion: Milt Holland
Keyboards: David Foster
Horns: Chuck Findley, Jim Horn, Dick Hyde, Jackie Kelso Strings (arrangements): Artie Butler, Richard Carpenter
Backing Vocals: Donny Gerrard, Gail Haness, Ann Orson, Brian Russell, Brenda Russell

== Track listing ==
=== Side one ===
1. "Crossroads" 3:28
2. "Lonely Night (Angel Face)" 3:19
3. "Stephen" 4:23
4. "Bad Blood" (Neil Sedaka, Phil Cody) 3:09
5. "Goodman Goodbye"* 3:55
6. "Baby Blue" 3:32
- (On the US album The Hungry Years, "Goodman Goodbye" is replaced with "Your Favorite Entertainer", which is 3:32 in length.)

=== Side two ===
1. "The Queen of 1964"* 3:57
2. "New York City Blues" 4:22
3. "When You Were Lovin' Me" 4:35
4. "The Hungry Years" 4:08
5. "Breaking Up Is Hard to Do" (Howard Greenfield, Neil Sedaka) (ballad version) 3:21
- (On the US album The Hungry Years, "The Queen of 1964" is replaced with "Tit for Tat")

== Re-release ==
=== 1998 ===
All the tracks from the British album were included in the Varese Sarabande 1998 re-issue of the American album The Hungry Years; hence, although the re-issue contains the track listing of the American album, the British songs "Goodman Goodbye" and "The Queen Of 1964" were included as two of the four bonus tracks.

See also The Hungry Years

=== 2012 ===
In April 2012, the album Overnight Success was re-issued by BGO Records in combination with the album The Tra-La Days Are Over on CD.

== Charts ==
=== Monthly charts ===
Monthly chart performance for Overnight Success
Chart (1978)	Peak position
Soviet Albums (Moskovskij Komsomolets)	4

== Certifications ==
Region	Certification	Certified units/sales
United Kingdom (BPI)	Silver	60,000^{^}
^{^} Shipments figures based on certification alone.
