= Steppin' Out (Neil Sedaka album) =

Studio album by Neil Sedaka
- Released: 1976
- Genre: Pop
- Label: Rocket (US); Polydor (UK)
- Producer: Neil Sedaka, Robert Appère

Neil Sedaka chronology
Overnight Success (UK); The Hungry Years (US) (1975)	Steppin' Out (1976)	A Song (1977)

Steppin' Out is a 1976 album containing the works of Neil Sedaka. In America it was the third and final album of a trilogy of albums issued by The Rocket Record Company. (Rocket would issue a compilation album, Neil Sedaka's Greatest Hits, in 1977; but it contained no new material.) Outside America Steppin' Out was issued on the Polydor label. In 1998, the Varèse Sarabande label reissued Steppin' Out and included four bonus tracks.

The title track peaked at number 36 on the Billboard Hot 100, and featured backing vocals by Elton John.

== Track listing ==
=== Side One ===
1. "Sing Me"
2. "You Gotta Make Your Own Sunshine"
3. "No. 1 with a Heartache"
4. "Steppin' Out"
5. "Love in the Shadows"
6. "Cardboard California"

=== Side Two ===
1. "Here We Are Falling In Love Again"
2. "I Let You Walk Away"
3. "Good Times, Good Music, Good Friends"
4. "Perfect Strangers"
5. "Bad and Beautiful"
6. "Summer Nights"

== Reception ==
AllMusic said "there are no memorable tunes here, and the craft simply doesn't offer the pleasures it once did. Consequently, it's only of interest to hardcore followers". The Windsor Star opined that "I liked Sedaka better when he was still worried about his comeback ... there was a hunger then that is missing from this album ... even Elton John would find it a bit soft around the edges".

== Singles and EPs ==
Many of the songs on this album were released on 45 rpm singles; some were even included on a 33-1/3 rpm EP album in the UK. Those songs that saw such a release are as follows:

- "Love in the Shadows" (No. 16 on US pop charts in 1976)
- "Steppin' Out" (No. 36 on US pop charts in 1976)
- "I Let You Walk Away" (B-side of "Steppin' Out")
- "No. 1 With A Heartache" (issued as a 45 rpm single in the UK on Polydor label; not issued on a 45 in the US)
- "Good Times, Good Music, Good Friends" (B-side of "No. 1 With A Heartache" in the UK)
- "You Gotta Make Your Own Sunshine" (No. 52 on US pop charts in late 1976-early 1977)
- "Perfect Strangers" (B-side of "You Gotta Make Your Own Sunshine")

In 1976, Polydor issued an EP in the UK entitled, "Make Your Own Sunshine". This EP included "You Gotta Make Your Own Sunshine" and "Summer Nights" along with "Tit For Tat" and "New York City Blues", two songs from earlier Neil Sedaka albums.

== Varese Sarabande re-release ==
In 1998, Varèse Sarabande reissued Steppin' Out and included the following bonus tracks:

- (13) "(Baby) Don't Let It Mess Your Mind" (B-side of "Love in the Shadows" in the US)
- (14) "Time Waits For No One" (it is unknown when this song was recorded)
- (15) "(Is This the Way to) Amarillo" (from the Elektra album A Song; No. 44 on US pop charts in 1977)
- (16) "Should've Never Let You Go" (duet with daughter Dara Sedaka; from the Elektra album In the Pocket; No. 19 on US pop charts in 1980)
