= Emergence (Neil Sedaka album) =

Studio album by Neil Sedaka
- Released: September 1971
- Recorded: RCA, New York City
- Genre: Pop
- Label: RCA Victor
- Producer: Wally Gold

Neil Sedaka chronology
Oh Carol (1970)	Emergence (1971)	Solitaire (1972)

Emergence is an album by the American pop singer Neil Sedaka, released in September 1971 on the RCA Victor label, marking a short-lived reunion between Sedaka and the label, since RCA Victor dropped him at the end of 1966. Emergence was released in some areas on Kirshner Records, Don Kirshner's private record label. The album was not a sales success, but has acquired a cult following among Sedaka's fans. Four of its songs made their way onto 45 rpm singles releases: "I'm A Song (Sing Me)" b/w "Silent Movies" and "Superbird" b/w "Rosemary Blue". Of all the albums Sedaka has recorded, he considers Emergence to be his favorite.

== Track listing ==
All tracks composed by Neil Sedaka and Howard Greenfield

=== Side one ===
1. "I'm a Song (Sing Me)"
2. "Gone with the Morning"
3. "Superbird"
4. "Silent Movies"
5. "Little Song"
6. "Prelude"
7. "Cardboard California"

=== Side two ===
1. "One More Mountain to Climb"
2. "God Bless Joanna"
3. "Is Anybody Gonna Miss You"
4. "What Have They Done to the Moon"
5. "Rosemary Blue"
6. "Wish I Was a Carousel"
7. "I'm a Song (Sing Me)" — reprise

== Notes ==
- The opening track, "I'm A Song (Sing Me)", was also covered by Helen Reddy and Lou Christie; the Christie version was retitled "Sing Me, Sing Me".
- In 1976, Sedaka produced new versions of "I'm A Song (Sing Me)" and "Cardboard California" for his album Steppin' Out. "I'm A Song (Sing Me)" was retitled "Sing Me".
- The Los Angeles band Climax recorded a version of Rosemary Blue, which went unreleased until bootleg CD's of their material saw release.

== CD re-issue ==
This album was reissued on CD by BGO Records in 2009.
