= Neil Sedaka: All Time Greatest Hits, Volume 2 =

Compilation album by Neil Sedaka
- Released: 1991
- Recorded: 1958–1966
- Genre: Pop
- Label: RCA Records
- Producer: Al Nevins; Don Kirshner; Hugo & Luigi; Joe René (original recordings); Ron Furmanek; Steve Kolanjian (compilation release)

Neil Sedaka chronology
Neil Sedaka: All Time Greatest Hits (1988)	Neil Sedaka: All Time Greatest Hits, Volume 2 (1991)	Timeless — The Very Best of Neil Sedaka (1991)

Neil Sedaka: All Time Greatest Hits, Volume 2 is a compilation album containing the works of American pop singer Neil Sedaka. The songs featured are some of Sedaka's lesser-known songs from his days with RCA Victor from 1958 to 1966, songs that were not included on the 1988 album Neil Sedaka: All Time Greatest Hits. The album was released in 1991 by RCA Records.

== Track listing ==
All songs by Neil Sedaka and Howard Greenfield unless otherwise noted.

1. "The Diary" (alternate take) (2:52)
2. "I Go Ape" (2:32)
3. "Stupid Cupid" (2:42)
4. "The Same Old Fool" (3:02)
5. "Don't Lead Me On" (2:55)
6. "All The Words In The World" (2:36)
7. "Waiting For Never (La Terza Luna)" (Ronnie Grossman, Luis Enriquez Bacalov) (2:45)
8. "Look Inside Your Heart" (Grossman) (3:25)
9. "The Dreamer" (Grossman) (3:10)
10. "Bad Girl" (2:36)
11. "Wait 'Till You See My Baby" (2:47)
12. "The Closest Thing To Heaven" (3:01)
13. "Sunny" (2:33)
14. "I Hope He Breaks Your Heart" (Sedaka, Greenfield, Helen Miller) (2:31)
15. "Let The People Talk" (Sedaka, Greenfield, Miller) (2:38)
16. "In The Chapel With You" (Grossman, Franco Migliacci) (3:35)
17. "The World Through A Tear" (Peter Allen, Christopher Allen, Richard Everitt) (3:24)
18. "The Answer To My Prayer" (P. Allen, C. Allen, Everitt) (2:04)
19. "Blue Boy" (Grossman, Hank Hunter) (2:27)
20. "We Can Make It If We Try" (Sedaka, Carole Bayer) (2:40)
21. "Station Announcements" (1:01)

== Recording dates ==
Sources:

- October 27, 1958— "The Diary" (alternate take)
- January 15, 1959— "I Go Ape"
- April 1, 1959— "Stupid Cupid"
- October 24, 1960— "The Same Old Fool"
- October 5, 1961— "Don’t Lead Me On"
- February 9, 1962— "All the Words in the World"
- September 10, 1962— "Waiting for Never (La Terza Luna)", "Look Inside Your Heart", "Station Announcements"
- May 6, 1963— "The Dreamer"
- September 23, 1963— "Bad Girl", "Wait ‘Till You See My Baby"
- February 5, 1964— "The Closest Thing to Heaven"
- May 25, 1964— "Sunny"
- September 30, 1964— "I Hope He Breaks Your Heart", "Let the People Talk"
- December 29, 1964— "In The Chapel With You"
- June 7, 1965— "The World Through a Tear"
- November 6, 1965— "The Answer to My Prayer", "Blue Boy"
- October 4, 1966— "We Can Make It If We Try"

== Personnel ==
=== Original recordings (1958–1966) ===
- Neil Sedaka — vocals
- Al Nevins — producer (tracks 1–11, 21)
- Don Kirshner — producer (tracks 4–11)
- Hugo & Luigi (Hugo Peretti and Luigi Creatore) — producers (track 12)
- Joe René — producer (tracks 13–20)
- Stan Applebaum — orchestra conductor (tracks 4, 10–12), arranger (tracks 10–12)
- Alan Lorber — arranger, conductor (tracks 5, 6, 9)
- Garry Sherman — arranger, conductor (track 13)
- Jimmy Wisner — arranger, conductor (tracks 14, 15, 17–19)
- Artie Butler — arranger, conductor (track 20)

=== Compilation release (1991) ===
- Ron Furmanek — producer
- Steve Kolanjian — producer, liner notes
- Don Wardell — digital series coordinator
- John Snyder — digital producer
- Joe Lopes — engineering
- Jay Newland — engineering
- Jacqueline Murphy — art direction
- John Robinette — illustration
