= Laughter in the Rain (1974 Neil Sedaka album) =

Studio album by Neil Sedaka
- Released: 1974
- Recorded: November–December 1973
- Studio: Clover Recording Studios, Hollywood, California
- Genre: Pop
- Label: Polydor (U.K.)
- Producer: Neil Sedaka, Robert Appère

Neil Sedaka chronology
The Tra-La Days Are Over (1973)	Laughter in the Rain (1974)	Live at the Royal Festival Hall (1974)

Laughter in the Rain is a 1974 British album by American pop star Neil Sedaka. It was released in the UK in 1974 on the Polydor label. The album was recorded in the US at Clover Recording Studios in Hollywood over the course of several sessions from November–December 1973. The album entered the UK charts on 22 June 1974 rising to No.17 and stayed in the charts for 10 weeks. The album gained a Silver Certificate from the BPI.

Several songs from this album were imported into the United States for the Rocket album Sedaka's Back in the fall of 1974.

The album contains Sedaka's tribute to American actress and singer Betty Grable. She had died just a few months earlier.

== Track listing ==
=== Side one ===
1. "The Immigrant"*
2. "A Little Lovin'"*
3. "Sad Eyes"*
4. "Flame"
5. "Laughter in the Rain"*
6. "For the Good of the Cause"**

=== Side two ===
1. "The Way I Am"*
2. "Going Nowhere"
3. "Love Ain't an Easy Thing"**
4. "Betty Grable"***
5. "Endlessly"**

== Charts ==
Chart (1974/75)	Peak position
Australia (Kent Music Report)	67

== Notes ==
- The songs marked with an asterisk were incorporated in Sedaka's Back.
- The songs marked with a double asterisk were bonus tracks on Varese Sarabande's 1997 CD reissue of Sedaka's Back
- The song marked with a triple asterisk was a bonus track on Varese Serabande's 1998 CD reissue of The Hungry Years

== CD re-issue ==
In 2013, Polydor authorized a 24-bit digitally remastered CD of "Laughter In The Rain" and issued it in selected European Union countries.
