= A Song =

Studio album by Neil Sedaka
- Released: 1977
- Studios: Record Plant, New York City
- Genre: Pop
- Length: 39:44
- Labels: Elektra (US); Polydor (Europe)
- Producer: George Martin

Neil Sedaka chronology
Steppin' Out (1976)	A Song (1977)	All You Need Is The Music (1978)

A Song is an album by the American musician Neil Sedaka, released in 1977. It was produced by George Martin and released in 1977 on the Elektra label in the US, marking the beginning of Sedaka's association with Elektra, which would run through 1981. Outside of the US, A Song was released on the Polydor label. After several record labels released bootleg CD's sourced from vinyl pressings over the years, the album was officially remastered and released on CD and digital platforms on November 11, 2022.

== Track listing ==
Side one

1. "A Song" - (Neil Sedaka / Phil Cody) 3:13
2. "You Never Done It Like That" - (Neil Sedaka / Howard Greenfield) 3:05
3. "The Leaving Game" - (Neil Sedaka / Howard Greenfield) 2:42
4. "Amarillo" - (Neil Sedaka / Howard Greenfield) 3:15
5. "Alone at Last" - (Neil Sedaka / Phil Cody) 4:00
6. "Hollywood Lady" - (Neil Sedaka / Howard Greenfield) 4:30

Side two

1. "I've Never Really Been in Love Before" - (Neil Sedaka / Howard Greenfield) 3:10
2. "One-Night Stand" - (Neil Sedaka / Phil Cody) 3:26
3. "Hot and Sultry Nights" - (Neil Sedaka / Phil Cody) 3:59
4. "Sleazy Love" - (Neil Sedaka / Phil Cody) 3:56
5. "Tin Pan Alley" - (Neil Sedaka / Howard Greenfield) 3:28
6. "A Song" (reprise) - (Neil Sedaka / Phil Cody) 1:30

Arranged by George Martin

== Singles release ==
Five of the songs from this album made their way onto 45 rpm singles: "Amarillo" (U.S. No. 44, AC No. 4; Canada AC No. 2) with its B-side "The Leaving Game", and "Alone at Last" (U.S. No. 104, AC No. 17; Canada AC No. 10) with its B-side "Sleazy Love". In Australia, "You Never Done It Like That" saw a 45 rpm release as well, with "Sleazy Love" as its B-side.

A remix of the track "Amarillo" was released on the 2001 retrospective CD set, Produced by George Martin: 50 Years in Recording.

Sedaka noted that "Alone at Last" became a minor jazz standard; he would often walk into piano bars and hear the song playing only to realize it was his own composition.

== Notes ==
- "Amarillo" had originally been written by Neil Sedaka and Howard Greenfield for the British pop star Tony Christie, who made a No. 18 hit out of it. Later in the 2000s, "Amarillo" would enjoy newfound popularity thanks to comedian Peter Kay using the Tony Christie version in a number for Comic Relief.
- Captain & Tennille produced a cover version of "You Never Done It Like That" in 1978, which went to No. 10 on the US pop charts.
