= That's When the Music Takes Me =

Single by Neil Sedaka

from the album Neil Sedaka (US) Solitaire (UK)
- B-side: "Standing on the Inside"
- Released: 1972 (British Isles); July 1975 (North America)
- Genre: Pop, Easy Listening
- Label: RCA (British Isles); Rocket (North America)
- Songwriter: Neil Sedaka
- Producers: Neil Sedaka, 10CC

Neil Sedaka singles chronology
"The Immigrant" (1975)	"That's When the Music Takes Me" (1972)	"Bad Blood" (1975)

"That's When the Music Takes Me" is a song written and originally recorded by Neil Sedaka in 1972. It is a track from his Solitaire LP, as it was billed in the UK, entitled as Neil Sedaka in the U.S.

The song became a hit in the UK and Ireland in early 1973, reaching the top 20 hit in both nations. It was released in the U.S. (#27) and Canada (#16) in 1975. It also became an easy listening hit, reaching the top 10 on both nations' adult contemporary charts.

"That's When the Music Takes Me" features backing by 10cc.

The song is one of the few hit songs in which Sedaka wrote the lyrics in addition to the music. He uses the song as the finale to his concerts.

== Personnel ==
- Neil Sedaka – piano, Fender Rhodes, lead vocals
- Graham Gouldman – bass guitar, backing vocals
- Lol Creme – guitar, backing vocals
- Kevin Godley – drums, percussion, backing vocals
- Eric Stewart – lead guitar, backing vocals

== Chart history ==
Chart (1972–73)	Peak position
Ireland (IRMA)	15
UK Singles Chart	18

Chart (1975)	Peak position
Canada RPM Adult Contemporary	9
Canada RPM Top Singles	16
U.S. Billboard Hot 100	27
U.S. Billboard Easy Listening	7
U.S. Cash Box Top 100	30
