= Neil Sedaka: Now =

Studio album by Neil Sedaka
- Released: 1981
- Label: Elektra

Neil Sedaka: Now is a studio album by American songwriter and pop star Neil Sedaka. It was released in 1981 by Elektra Records, and was the last Sedaka album to be released on that label. As with other Neil Sedaka albums of that period, it was released in Europe on the Polydor label.

== Track listing ==
=== Side one ===
1. "Losing You"
2. "What Have They Done to My Town?"
3. "Pictures from the Past"
4. "Since You've Been Gone"
5. "On the Road Again"

=== Side two ===
1. "Summertime Madness"
2. "My World Keeps Slipping Away"
3. "Love Is Spreading Over the World"
4. "Bring Me Down Slow"
5. "The Big Parade"

== Singles releases ==
Elektra issued two 45 rpm singles featuring material from this album. The first one featured "My World Keeps Slipping Away" (b/w "Love Is Spreading Over the World"), which reached No. 36 on the US Adult Contemporary Chart. The second single featured "Losing You" (b/w "On the Road Again"), but did not chart. (This single also saw a European release on the Polydor label.)

== CD re-issue from vinyl ==
In 2013, a bootleg album was released on CD in selected European Union countries, from vinyl.

In November 2022, the album was officially reissued on CD and digital streaming platforms along with three other albums Sedaka released on the Elektra label between 1977 and 1981.

== Notes ==
- Neil Sedaka had previously recorded "Pictures from the Past" in 1965 during his days with RCA Victor, but the 1965 version was not released until 1978, when it was included in the RCA compilation The Many Sides of Neil Sedaka. (A German-language version, Nur Ein Bild Von Dir, was issued in the 1960s for Sedaka's fans in West Germany.) The version included on this album is a newly recorded version.
- Sedaka's recording of "Since You've Been Gone" was a cover version of a song that he and Howard Greenfield had written for Clyde McPhatter in the early 1960s.
- Sedaka's recording of "My World Keeps Slippin' Away" was a cover version of a song he and Howard Greenfield wrote for Connie Francis under the title "My World Is Slipping Away" in 1967.
- Sedaka's recording of "Love Is Spreading Over the World" was a cover version of a song he had composed for Perry Como, who recorded it in 1970, and for The Captain and Tennille, who had included it on their Dream album in 1978.
- Sedaka's recording of "The Big Parade" was a cover version of a song made famous by Jane Olivor on her 1977 album Chasing Rainbows and also made famous by Michael Allen in 1975 where the single charted on the Adult Contemporary chart, peaking at #23.
