= Solitaire (Neil Sedaka album) =

1972 album by Neil Sedaka

Studio album by Neil Sedaka
- Released: 1972
- Recorded: June 1972
- Studios: Strawberry (Stockport, England)
- Genre: Pop
- Length: 41:22
- Label: RCA Victor
- Producer: Neil Sedaka

Neil Sedaka chronology
Emergence (1971)	Solitaire (1972)	The Tra-La Days Are Over (1973)

Alternate cover
- The West German RCA International release of the Solitaire album, simply retitled Neil Sedaka

Professional ratings
Review scores
Source	Rating
AllMusic	3.5/5 stars

Solitaire is a 1972 album by American singer-songwriter Neil Sedaka.

== Background and recording ==
The album was produced at Strawberry Studios in Stockport, England, with the musical support of Graham Gouldman, Lol Creme and Kevin Godley who – together with the album's recording engineer Eric Stewart – would shortly become the successful pop band 10cc.

Sedaka opted to record at Strawberry after meeting Gouldman in New York and discovering his association with Stewart, Godley and Creme. The trio had recorded the single "Umbopo", which Sedaka liked, under the band name of Doctor Father.

His work with the four British musicians proved to be a pivotal influence on their collective decision to forge a career as a band. Gouldman recalled: "It was Neil Sedaka's success that did it, I think. We'd just been accepting any job we were offered and were getting really frustrated. We knew that we were worth more than that, but it needed something to prod us into facing that. We were a bit choked to think that we'd done the whole of Neil's first album with him just for flat session fees when we could have been recording our own material."

Sedaka recorded one more album with the band members, The Tra-La Days Are Over. Conspicuously absent from the Solitaire album was any work by Sedaka's long-running songwriting partner Howard Greenfield; Sedaka had by this point begun another partnership with Phil Cody, and both Sedaka and Greenfield had concluded that their collaboration had run its course.

The track "Better Days Are Coming" was reworked by Sedaka as the Japanese opening theme for the 1985 anime series Mobile Suit Zeta Gundam. The revised song became "Zeta - Toki o Koete" (Ζ・刻を越えて, Zēta - Toki o Koete; lit. "Zeta - Beyond Time"). This version was later translated back into English with new lyrics and retitled "Go Beyond the Time" by Richie Kotzen.

== Release ==
The album, released after a successful English tour in early 1972, marked the comeback of Sedaka after a 10-year absence from the charts. Three singles were lifted from the album, "Beautiful You" (UK No. 43), "That's When the Music Takes Me" (UK No. 18; US No. 27), and "Dimbo Man".

The Solitaire album was not released in the US initially, but eventually it was issued after Sedaka regained his popularity in his home country in 1974-75 with the release of the album Sedaka's Back. "Don't Let It Mess Your Mind" was never released in the United States, except as a live performance on The Midnight Special, in which Sedaka described it as a selection from a "forgotten album, one that you might not find at your local record store." In West Germany, the album was released on the budget label RCA International, simply titled Neil Sedaka.

The album's title track, "Solitaire", later became a hit single for Andy Williams (1973) and The Carpenters (1975), and was recorded by Elvis on the album From Elvis Presley Boulevard, Memphis, Tennessee (1976).

In 2010, BGO Records re-released the album on CD.

== Track listing ==
All tracks written by Neil Sedaka and Phil Cody, except where noted

=== Side one ===
1. "That's When the Music Takes Me" (Sedaka) – 3:35
2. "Beautiful You" – 3:35
3. "Express Yourself" – 3:21
4. "Anywhere You're Gonna Be (Leba's Song)" – 3:30
5. "Home" – 3:10
6. "Adventures of a Boy Child Wonder" – 3:10

=== Side two ===
1. "Better Days Are Coming" (Sedaka) – 4:17
2. "Dimbo Man" (Sedaka, Roger Atkins) – 3:58
3. "Trying to Say Goodbye" – 3:20
4. "Solitaire" – 5:02
5. "Don't Let It Mess Your Mind" – 4:24

== Personnel ==
- Neil Sedaka – piano, Fender Rhodes, Hammond organ, vibraphone, vocals
- Graham Gouldman – bass guitar, guitar, backing vocals
- Lol Creme – guitar, backing vocals
- Kevin Godley – drums, backing vocals
- Eric Stewart – recording engineer, lead guitar, backing vocals
