= Circulate =

1961 album by Neil Sedaka

Studio album by Neil Sedaka
- Released: 1961
- Genre: Pop
- Label: RCA Victor
- Producer: Al Nevins

Neil Sedaka chronology
Rock with Sedaka (1959)	Circulate (1961)	Neil Sedaka Sings Little Devil and His Other Hits (1961)

Professional ratings
Review scores
Source	Rating
New Record Mirror	3/5

Circulate is the second solo album of Neil Sedaka after his 1959 debut solo album Rock with Sedaka. Circulate was released in 1961 by RCA Victor and was produced by Al Nevins and Don Kirshner. Except for the title song "Circulate" and "I Found My World In You", the whole album contains covers of the 1930s, 1940s and 1950s songs as interpreted by Sedaka. Two of the songs were re-issued as B-sides of other hits: "I Found My World In You" was the B-side of "Sweet Little You" later in 1961, and "Circulate" was the B-side of "Alice In Wonderland" in 1963. Sedaka later recorded Italian-language versions of "Smile" (as "Sorridi") and "All the Way" (as "Si' Amore")

In Japan, Circulate was released under the title Look To The Rainbow.

== Track listing ==
Side One

1. "Circulate" (Neil Sedaka, Howard Greenfield)
2. "Smile" (Charlie Chaplin, Geoff Parsons, John Turner)
3. "Nothing Ever Changes My Love for You" (Marvin Fisher, Jack Segal)
4. "All the Way" (Sammy Cahn, Jimmy Van Heusen)
5. "We Kiss in a Shadow" (Oscar Hammerstein II, Richard Rodgers)
6. "Bess, You Is My Woman Now" (Ira Gershwin, George Gershwin, Dubose Heyward)

Side Two

7. "Look to the Rainbow" (E.Y. "Yip" Harburg, Burton Lane)
8. "Everything Happens to Me" (Tom Adair, Matt Dennis)
9. "A felicidade" (Vinicius de Moraes, Antonio Carlos Jobim)
10. "Angel Eyes" (Earl Brent, Matt Dennis)
11. "I Found My World in You" (Neil Sedaka, Howard Greenfield)
12. "You Took Advantage of Me" (Lorenz Hart, Richard Rodgers)

== Re-release ==
Neil Sedaka and Circulate

Studio album by Neil Sedaka
- Released: 1995
- Genre: Pop

The popular album was re-released on CD in 1995 alongside the contents of the debut album Rock with Sedaka.

In 2012, Hallmark Records re-released Circulate yet again on CD.
