= Crying My Heart Out for You =

Single by Neil Sedaka
- B-side: "You Gotta Learn Your Rhythm and Blues"
- Released: May 1959
- Recorded: 1959
- Genre: Pop
- Length: 2:15
- Label: RCA Victor
- Songwriters: Neil Sedaka; Howard Greenfield
- Producer: Al Nevins

Neil Sedaka singles chronology
"I Go Ape" (1959)	"Crying My Heart Out for You" (1959)	"Oh! Carol" (1959)

"Crying My Heart Out for You" is a song written and composed by Neil Sedaka and Howard Greenfield. It is not to be confused with the Ricky Skaggs song "Crying My Heart Out Over You" (1981).

The song was the third hit single recorded by Sedaka immediately following the success of his first hit single "The Diary", and the follow-up single "I Go Ape." Released in early 1959, "Crying My Heart Out for You" was not as successful as Sedaka’s previous two hits, and failed miserably on the U.S. pop charts, "bubbling" under the Billboard Hot 100 chart with a #111 peak. However, it was more successful in Italy, where the record hit #6.

The record's commercial failure nearly prompted RCA Victor to drop Sedaka from its roster; after Sedaka begged the company for a second chance, he took the opportunity to analyze the popular music of the day and wrote "Oh! Carol," beginning a five-year string of hit singles that would continue until the British Invasion.
