= Lonely Night (Angel Face) =

- US single picture sleeve

Single by Captain & Tennille

from the album Song of Joy
- B-side: "Smile for Me One More Time"
- Released: January 1976
- Recorded: 1975
- Length: 3:16
- Label: A&M
- Songwriter: Neil Sedaka
- Producers: Captain & Tennille

Captain & Tennille singles chronology
"The Way I Want to Touch You" (1975)	"Lonely Night (Angel Face)" (1976)	"Shop Around" (1976)

"Lonely Night (Angel Face)" is a song written by Neil Sedaka. The song was first recorded by Sedaka and appeared on his 1975 studio album, The Hungry Years. The following year the song was made popular when covered by the pop music duo Captain & Tennille, who took their version to number 3 on the Billboard Hot 100.

== Background ==
In 1976, "Lonely Night (Angel Face)" was a hit single for Captain & Tennille, who had recorded another Sedaka song "Love Will Keep Us Together" a year earlier. Their version of "Lonely Night (Angel Face)" first hit the US Billboard Hot 100 singles chart on January 24, 1976, entering at number 69. It rose to number 3 on the Hot 100 and number 1 on the Billboard Easy Listening chart in March 1976. On the Cashbox chart, it also reached number 1. The song became a Gold record, and Sedaka's biggest hit as a lyricist (besides this and "That's When the Music Takes Me," Sedaka had generally only written the music to his songs, with Howard Greenfield—from whom Sedaka was estranged at the time—or Phil Cody writing the lyrics).

In Canada the song went to number 1 on the RPM National Top Singles Chart. It hit the pole position on April 17, 1976, and stayed atop the chart for two weeks before bowing out to "Bohemian Rhapsody" by Queen. It was their third of fourteen hit singles.

== Reception ==
Billboard praised the "tight instrumentals."

== Chart performance ==
=== Weekly charts ===
Chart (1976)	Peak position
Australia (Kent Music Report)	9
Canada RPM Top Singles	1
Canada RPM Adult Contemporary	1
New Zealand (RIANZ)	10
US Billboard Hot 100	3
US Billboard Easy Listening	1
US Cash Box Top 100	1

=== Year-end charts ===
Chart (1976)	Rank
Australia (Kent Music Report)	83
Canada	7
US Billboard Hot 100	39
US Cash Box Top 100	32
US Billboard Easy Listening	22

== See also ==
- List of number-one adult contemporary singles of 1976 (U.S.)
