= The Many Sides of Neil Sedaka =

Compilation album by Neil Sedaka
- Released: 1978
- Recorded: 1958–1965
- Genre: Pop
- Length: 32:16
- Label: RCA Victor

The Many Sides Of Neil Sedaka is a 1978 compilation album released by RCA Victor Records containing works of pop singer Neil Sedaka. The album contains some of Sedaka's lesser-known works in the period from 1958-1965, although three of the songs on the album were charting hits at the time of their original release.

== Track listing ==
=== Side A ===
1. "Blue Boy" (2:20) (recorded 11/6/1965)
2. "The Answer To My Prayer" (2:20) (recorded 11/6/1965)
3. "Don't Lead Me On" (2:55) (recorded 10/5/1961)
4. "The Same Old Fool" (3:02) (recorded 10/24/1960)
5. "No Vacancy" (2:47) (recorded 10/27/1958)
6. "Waiting For Never" (2:31) (recorded 1962)

=== Side B ===
1. "Wait 'Til You See My Baby" (2:50) (recorded 9/23/1963)
2. "Pictures From The Past" (2:39) (recorded 6/7/1965)
3. "Look Inside Your Heart" (3:09) (recorded 1962)
4. "Bad Girl" (2:31) (recorded 9/23/1963)
5. "Your Heart Has Changed Its Mind" (2:30) (recorded 7/10/1961)
6. "The World Through A Tear" (2:42) (recorded 6/7/1965)

== Notes ==
- Three of the songs on this album charted when they were originally released. "Bad Girl" hit #33 in late 1963, "The World Through A Tear" garnered a #76 ranking in mid-1965, and "The Answer To My Prayer" scored a #89 in late 1965-early 1966.
- The songs "Pictures From The Past" and "Your Heart Has Changed Its Mind" were not released at the time they were recorded; this marked the first issuance of these two songs.
- The rest of the songs on the album were B-sides of other bigger Sedaka hits.
- "Waiting For Never" and "Look Inside Your Heart" were English-language versions of Sedaka's Italian-language hits, "La terza luna" and "I tuoi capricci", both of which enjoyed far greater success in Italy than they ever did in the United States.
- "Bad Girl" also has an Italian-language equivalent, "I primi giorni"
- Sedaka actually recorded two songs titled "Bad Girl". The version heard on this album is the most common version; but there is an earlier version of "Bad Girl" with different lyrics and a faster tempo.
- Sedaka recorded German-language versions of "Pictures From The Past" ("Nur ein Bild von Dir"), "Wait Till You See My Baby" ("So wie mein Baby") and "The World Through A Tear" ("Die Welt ohne Dich")
- To promote this album in the Philippines, a 45 rpm reissue of "Blue Boy" b/w "Don't Lead Me On" was released.

== 2010 Re-release ==
In 2010, Wounded Bird Records reissued the tracks from The Many Sides Of Neil Sedaka in combination with the songs from the 1961 album Neil Sedaka Sings Little Devil And His Other Hits.
