= The Tra-La Days Are Over =

Studio album by Neil Sedaka
- Released: 1973
- Recorded: Spring, 1973
- Studios: Strawberry (Stockport, England)
- Genre: Pop
- Label: MGM
- Producers: Neil Sedaka; 10cc

Neil Sedaka chronology
Solitaire (1972)	The Tra-La Days Are Over (1973)	Laughter in the Rain (1974)

The Tra-La Days Are Over is a 1973 album by American singer-songwriter Neil Sedaka.

== Overview ==
The album was the second to be produced at Strawberry Studios in England in collaboration with Graham Gouldman, Lol Creme, Kevin Godley and Eric Stewart, who had formed the band 10cc since their first joint venture with Sedaka on Solitaire (1972).

The album, which consolidated his return to popularity after his lengthy absence from the charts, yielded two hit singles for Sedaka, "Standing on the Inside" (No 26 in the UK and No 10 in Australia, June 1973) and "Our Last Song Together" (No 31 in the UK, August 1973). The latter track commemorates the ending of his partnership with lyricist Howard Greenfield; the album title is taken from a line in this song.

Another song, "Love Will Keep Us Together", became a US No.1 for Captain & Tennille in 1975. Their version peaked at No.32 in Britain. The Captain & Tennille acknowledged Sedaka's authorship as well as his early-1970s comeback by working the phrase "Sedaka is back" into the song's fadeout.

On the liner notes to The Tra-La Days Are Over Sedaka added the dedication: "Thanks to Mike Curb for letting me have my way."

== Release ==
In 1982 Polydor Records, which had by this time acquired the rights to The Tra-La Days Are Over, re-issued the album as part of their "Special Price Series".

In 1991 Polydor re-released the album on CD, the first CD issue for this album. In 2004 they reissued the album again in the UK, this time as part of Universal Music's 50th Anniversary Archive Collection.

In April 2012 the program from The Tra-La Days Are Over was re-released in combination with the program from the 1975 album "Overnight Success" on CD by BGO Records.

== Track listing ==
(all music by Neil Sedaka)

=== Side one ===
1. "Little Brother" (lyrics by Phil Cody)
2. "Standing on the Inside" (lyrics by Sedaka)
3. "Alone in New York in the Rain" (lyrics by Cody)
4. "Caribbean Rainbow" (lyrics by Cody)
5. "Let Daddy Know" (lyrics by Howard Greenfield)
6. "Suspicions" (lyrics by Cody)

=== Side two ===
1. "Love Will Keep Us Together" (lyrics by Greenfield)
2. "The Other Side of Me" (lyrics by Greenfield)
3. "Rock and Roll Wedding Day" (lyrics by Cody)
4. "For Peace and Love" (lyrics by Cody)
5. "Our Last Song Together" (lyrics by Greenfield)

== Singles ==
Four singles were issued from this album:

- "Standing on the Inside" (ranked #26 on the UK charts) b/w "Let Daddy Know" (MGM label)
- "Suspicions" b/w "Alone In New York In The Rain"
- "Our Last Song Together" (ranked #31 on the UK charts) b/w "I Don't Know What I Like About You" (MGM label)
- "Love Will Keep Us Together" b/w "Rock and Roll Wedding Day" (Polydor label, released in France)

== Personnel ==
- Neil Sedaka – lead vocals and backing vocals, organ, acoustic and electric piano
- Lol Creme – lead guitar and backing vocals
- Eric Stewart – rhythm guitar and backing vocals
- Graham Gouldman – bass and backing vocals
- Kevin Godley – drums, tambourine and backing vocals
