= In the Pocket (Neil Sedaka album) =

Studio album by Neil Sedaka
- Released: 1980
- Genre: Pop
- Label: Elektra, Polydor
- Producer: Neil Sedaka, Robert Appère

Neil Sedaka chronology
Sunny (1979)	In the Pocket (1980)	Neil Sedaka's Greatest Hits (1980)

In the Pocket is a 1980 studio album by American pop singer Neil Sedaka. In America, it marked his third album on the Elektra label. Elsewhere around the world, it was released on the Polydor label. The first single issued was "Letting Go," in the autumn of 1979, but the single did not manage to reach the Hot 100.

However, In the Pocket became Sedaka's best-known Elektra album because of its second single, the duet he performed with his daughter Dara, "Should've Never Let You Go" which charted at No. 19 on the Billboard Hot 100 and No. 4 on the Adult Contemporary chart in 1980. It was a remake of a 1978 song, "Should've Never Let Her Go" from the album All You Need Is the Music, which Sedaka had sung solo. The top 20 duet was Sedaka's final appearance on the Hot 100.

== Track listing ==
All tracks composed by Neil Sedaka and Howard Greenfield; except where indicated

=== Side one ===
1. "Do It Like You Done It When You Meant It"
2. "Junkie for Your Love" (Neil Sedaka, Phil Cody)
3. "Letting Go" (Neil Sedaka, Phil Cody)
4. "You Better Leave That Girl Alone"
5. "My Friend"

=== Side two ===
1. "It's Good to Be Alive Again"
2. "You" (Neil Sedaka, Phil Cody)
3. "Should've Never Let You Go" (Neil Sedaka, Phil Cody) (Duet with Dara Sedaka)
4. "You're So Good for Me" (Dara Sedaka) (Backing vocals by Dara Sedaka)
5. "What a Difference a Day Makes" (María Grever, Stanley Adams)

== Singles ==
- "Letting Go" (b/w "It's Good to Be Alive Again" [US]; "Do It Like You Done It When You Meant It" [France]) No. 107 Bubbling Under Hot 100
- "Should've Never Let You Go" (b/w "You're So Good for Me") Side A: Duet with Dara Sedaka; Side B: Backing vocals by Dara Sedaka. No. 19 on Hot 100 Singles chart; No. 4 on Adult Contemporary chart.

== CD re-issue from vinyl ==
In 2009 and again in 2013, a bootleg album was released on CD in selected European Union countries, from vinyl. In November 2022, the album was officially reissued on CD and music streaming platforms.
