= Next Door to an Angel =

Single by Neil Sedaka
- B-side: "I Belong to You"
- Released: October 1962
- Genre: Pop
- Label: RCA Victor
- Songwriters: Neil Sedaka, Howard Greenfield

Neil Sedaka singles chronology
| "Breaking Up is Hard to Do" (1962) | "Next Door to an Angel" (1962) | "Alice in Wonderland" (1963) |

"Next Door to an Angel" is a rock and pop song written by Neil Sedaka and Howard Greenfield and recorded by Neil Sedaka in 1962. It was issued by RCA Victor Records. It reached No. 5 on the Billboard Hot 100 in late 1962. "Next Door to an Angel" also went to No. 19 on the Hot R&B Singles chart. It was Sedaka's last appearance on the American Top 10 until "Laughter in the Rain" in late 1974.

"Next Door to an Angel", in its original 45 rpm release, was backed with an older Sedaka melody, "I Belong To You", from 1959. It was also featured as the first song on the 1963 compilation album Neil Sedaka Sings His Greatest Hits.

== Chart history ==
| Chart (1962) | Peak position |
|---|---|
| Canada (CHUM Hit Parade) | 5 |
| New Zealand (Lever Hit Parade) | 4 |
| UK Singles (OCC) | 29 |
| U.S. Billboard Hot 100 | 5 |
| U.S. Billboard R&B | 19 |
| U.S. Cash Box Top 100 | 10 |
