= I Go Ape =

Single by Neil Sedaka

from the album Rock with Sedaka
- B-side: "Moon of Gold"
- Released: February 1959
- Recorded: January 15, 1959
- Studio: RCA Victor Studio A, New York City
- Genre: Rock and roll, novelty song
- Length: 2:22
- Label: RCA Victor
- Songwriters: Neil Sedaka; Howard Greenfield
- Producer: Al Nevins

Neil Sedaka singles chronology
"The Diary" (1958)	"I Go Ape" (1959)	"Crying My Heart Out for You" (1959)

"I Go Ape" is a song written by Neil Sedaka and Howard Greenfield, and recorded by Sedaka as a follow–up single to his first hit song "The Diary". It was released in February 1959, and also appears on Sedaka's 1959 debut solo album Rock with Sedaka. The rock and roll novelty song, which name-checks various primates, was performed in the boogie-woogie style of Jerry Lee Lewis.

"I Go Ape" was a relatively minor success in the United States, peaking at #42 on the Billboard Hot 100 chart. but was a much bigger success in the United Kingdom, where it reached #9 in the UK Singles Chart. In Canada it reached #15

Although Sedaka has insisted he played piano on the session, the session logbooks document Ernie Hayes as the keyboard player. Other musicians included Everett Barksdale and Kenny Burrell on guitar, Lloyd Trotman on bass, Sticks Evans on drums, and King Curtis on tenor sax. The arrangement was by Chuck Sagle.

It is not to be confused with the similar sounding and identically named song written near the same time by Bob Crewe, who was also based at the Brill Building as Sedaka and Greenfield were. Crewe's "I Go Ape" was briefly released as a single, credited to Frankie Tyler (a pseudonym for Frankie Valli, before the formation of The 4 Seasons).
