= Love in the Shadows (Neil Sedaka song) =

Single by Neil Sedaka

from the album Steppin' Out
- B-side: "(Baby) Don't Let It Mess Your Mind" (US); "Nana's Song" (UK); "Love Will Keep Us Together" (W. Germany); "No. 1 With A Heartache" (Rhodesia)
- Released: April 1976
- Recorded: 1975
- Genre: Pop, disco
- Length: 3:18
- Label: Rocket
- Songwriter(s): Neil Sedaka and Phil Cody
- Producer(s): Neil Sedaka and Robert Appere

Neil Sedaka singles chronology
"Breaking Up Is Hard To Do" (1975)	"Love in the Shadows" (1976)	"Steppin' Out" (1976)

"Love in the Shadows" is an uptempo pop song co-written and recorded by Neil Sedaka. The song became an international Top 20 hit in 1976.

The song reached number 16 on the U.S. Billboard Hot 100 and spent two weeks at number 4 on the Adult Contemporary chart.

The song was also a hit in Canada, charting quite closely to its U.S. peaks on both the Pop Singles chart (#18 for two weeks) as well as the Adult Contemporary chart (#6).

Chicago radio superstation WLS, which gave the song much airplay, ranked "Love in the Shadows" as the 88th most popular hit of 1976. It reached as high as #8 on their survey of June 26, 1976.

== Charts ==
=== Weekly charts ===
Chart (1976)	Peak position
Canadian RPM Top Singles	18
Canadian RPM Adult Contemporary	6
France	8
New Zealand	20
US Billboard Hot 100	16
US Billboard Easy Listening	4
US Cashbox Top 100	17

=== Year-end charts ===
Chart (1976)	Rank
Canada	148
US Billboard Hot 100	124
