= Bad Blood (Neil Sedaka song) =

Single by Neil Sedaka

from the album Overnight Success and The Hungry Years
- B-side: "Your Favorite Entertainer" (US); "Hey Mister Sunshine" (UK); "Baby Blue" (Italy)
- Released: September 1975
- Genre: Rock
- Length: 3:09
- Label: Rocket/MCA (US); Polydor (UK)
- Songwriters: Neil Sedaka, Phil Cody
- Producer: Neil Sedaka

Neil Sedaka singles chronology
"That's When the Music Takes Me" (1975)	"Bad Blood" (1975)	"Breaking Up Is Hard to Do" (1975)

"Bad Blood" is a popular song written by Neil Sedaka and Phil Cody. The song, with uncredited backing vocals by Elton John, reached number one on the Billboard Hot 100 in 1975 within four weeks of its release, remaining at the top position for three weeks. It was certified Gold by the RIAA and was the most successful individual commercial release in Sedaka's career. "Bad Blood" was replaced at the number one spot by John's single "Island Girl".

== Personnel ==
- Neil Sedaka – vocals, acoustic piano
- Elton John – background vocals (uncredited)
- Dean Parks, Steve Cropper – guitar
- David Foster – keyboards
- Chuck Findley, Dick Hyde, Jackie Kelso, Jim Horn – woodwinds
- Nigel Olsson – drums
- Leland Sklar – bass guitar
- Milt Holland – percussion

== Charts ==
=== Weekly charts ===
Chart (1975)	Peak position
Australia (Kent Music Report)	11
Canada RPM Top Singles	1
Canada RPM Adult Contemporary	31
US Billboard Hot 100	1
US Billboard Easy Listening	25
US Cash Box Top 100	1
US Record World	1

=== Year-end charts ===
Chart (1975)	Position
Australia (Kent Music Report)	97
Canada	2
US Billboard Hot 100	93

== Certifications ==
Region	Certification	Certified units/sales
Canada (Music Canada)	Gold	75,000^{^}
United States (RIAA)	Gold	1,000,000^{^}
^{^} Shipments figures based on certification alone.
