= The Immigrant (Neil Sedaka song) =

1975 single by Neil Sedaka

- 7" vinyl single cover

Single by Neil Sedaka
- B-side: "Your Favorite Entertainer" (US); "Hey Mister Sunshine" (UK); "Baby Blue" (Italy)
- Released: March 1975
- Recorded: 1975
- Genre: Pop
- Length: 3:43
- Label: Rocket/MCA (US); Polydor (UK)
- Songwriters: Neil Sedaka, Phil Cody
- Producers: Neil Sedaka, Robert Appère

Neil Sedaka singles chronology
"The Queen of 1964" (1975)	"The Immigrant" (1975)	"New York City Blues" (1975)

"The Immigrant" is a 1975 single written by Neil Sedaka and Phil Cody and performed by Sedaka. The single was the second release from his album, Sedaka's Back. "The Immigrant" was dedicated to John Lennon and the immigration problems that he faced. The single peaked at number 22 on the Billboard Hot 100 and spent one week at number one on the Easy Listening chart in May 1975.

Sedaka described "The Immigrant" as his most controversial song and the only time he ever publicly waded into politics as a performer. On an appearance on The Midnight Special in late 1976, he remarked that he had hoped "The Immigrant" would be a major hit because of his belief in the beauty and meaning of the lyrics, only to find that too many radio stations found the song's message too controversial, while another track on that album, "Love Will Keep Us Together," had a cover version by the Captain and Tennille that handily beat "The Immigrant" on the charts at the same time. In a 2023 interview with Morning Joe, he stated that Cody had recalled the alternating chords (I-v7) from the song "On Broadway," and Sedaka built the verse's melody on a slower progression based on those two chords. According to Philip Cody, the song's lyric writer, it was originally written as a tribute to his father, Anthony Feliciotto, who came to America from Sicily in 1930. Sedaka's grandparents had also emigrated, from Russia/Poland/Turkey. Lennon responded favorably, stating that Sedaka and other songwriters in his Brooklyn neighborhood were among "the greatest songwriters in the world;" Sedaka joked that there must have been "something in the egg cream."

== Chart history ==
Chart (1975)	Peak position
Canada RPM Adult Contemporary	3
Canada RPM Top Singles	9
New Zealand (RIANZ)	17
U.S. Billboard Hot 100	22
U.S. Billboard Easy Listening	1
U.S. Cash Box Top 100	28

== See also ==
- List of Billboard Easy Listening number ones of 1975
