= The Hungry Years =

Studio album by Neil Sedaka
- Released: 1975
- Genre: Pop
- Label: The Rocket Record Company
- Producer: Neil Sedaka, Robert Appere

Professional ratings
Review scores
| Source | Rating |
|---|---|
| Christgau's Record Guide | C+ |

The Hungry Years is an album by Neil Sedaka released by The Rocket Record Company in 1975.

The album is the American edition of Overnight Success, with two songs being replaced.

“The Queen of 1964” reached #35 in the UK in March 1975. The Captain and Tennille’s 1976 cover of “Lonely Night (Angel Face)” hit #3 on the Billboard Hot 100 and was certified gold. "Bad Blood", with uncredited backing vocals by Elton John, reached number one on the Billboard Hot 100 in 1975, and remained in that position for three weeks before being replaced by Elton John's single "Island Girl". It was the most successful individual commercial release in Sedaka's career.

“The Hungry Years”, one of Sedaka's most frequently requested non-single tracks, marked Sedaka's reunion with his long-time collaborator Howard Greenfield after having broken off their partnership in 1973. Sedaka and Greenfield would again work together more regularly in the late 1970s. Wayne Newton would make the song a hit on the easy listening chart in 1976.

== Personnel ==
Piano: Neil Sedaka
Guitar: Steve Cropper, Dean Parks
Bass: Leland Sklar
Drums: Nigel Olsson
Percussion: Milt Holland
Keyboards: David Foster
Horns: Chuck Findley, Jim Horn, Dick Hyde, Jackie Kelso
Strings (arrangements): Artie Butler, Richard Carpenter
Backing Vocals: Donny Gerrard, Gail Haness, Ann Orson (Elton John pseudonym), Brian Russell, Brenda Russell

== Track listing ==
All music composed by Sedaka; lyricist in (parentheses).

Side one

1. "Crossroads" (Phil Cody)
2. "Lonely Night (Angel Face)" (Sedaka)
3. "Stephen" (Howard Greenfield)
4. "Bad Blood" (Cody) (uncredited duet with Elton John)
5. "Your Favorite Entertainer" (Cody)
6. "Baby Blue" (Greenfield)

Side two

1. "Tit for Tat" (Greenfield)
2. "New York City Blues" (Cody)
3. "When You Were Lovin' Me" (Cody)
4. "The Hungry Years" (Greenfield)
5. "Breaking Up Is Hard to Do" (Greenfield; torch version originally arranged by Lenny Welch)

Bonus tracks from the 1998 CD re-issue

- (12) "Hey Mister Sunshine" (Dara Sedaka)
- (13) "The Queen Of 1964"*
- (14) "Betty Grable"
- (15) "Goodman Goodbye"* (Sedaka, Cody)
- "The Queen of 1964" was from Overnight Success; it was replaced by "Tit For Tat" in The Hungry Years.
- "Goodman Goodbye" was from Overnight Success; it was replaced by "Your Favorite Entertainer" in The Hungry Years.

== Certifications ==
| Region | Certification | Certified units/sales |
|---|---|---|
| Canada (Music Canada) | Gold | 50,000^{^} |
| United States (RIAA) | Gold | 500,000^{^} |
^{^} Shipments figures based on certification alone.
