= Breaking Up Is Hard to Do =

1962 single by Neil Sedaka

Single by Neil Sedaka

from the album Neil Sedaka Sings His Greatest Hits
- B-side: "As Long as I Live"
- Released: June 1962
- Genre: Brill Building, doo-wop
- Length: 2:18
- Label: RCA Victor
- Songwriters: Neil Sedaka, Howard Greenfield

Neil Sedaka singles chronology
"King of Clowns" (1962)	"Breaking Up Is Hard to Do" (1962)	"Next Door to an Angel" (1962)

"Breaking Up Is Hard to Do" is a song recorded by Neil Sedaka, co-written by Sedaka and Howard Greenfield. Sedaka recorded this song twice, in 1962 and 1975, in two significantly different arrangements, and it is considered to be his signature song. Between 1970 and 1975, it was a top-40 hit three separate times for three separate artists: Lenny Welch, The Partridge Family and Sedaka's second version. The song was also adapted into multiple languages, most notably in Italian and French.

== Original version ==
In his daily mini-concert on June 12, 2020, Sedaka recalled that the song's iconic scat intro ("come-a come-a down, dooby doo down down") was a result of him and Greenfield being unable to come up with a lyric for that section of the song and Sedaka improvising a vocalise, which they liked so much that they kept it in the finished product. Sedaka liked the vocalise so much that he wanted to use it as backing vocals throughout the track. In a later mini-concert, he mentioned that the basic feel had been inspired by "It Will Stand" by General Johnson and The Showmen, then a relatively minor hit that Sedaka liked, and also acknowledged some inspiration from The Everly Brothers' "Cathy's Clown" and an unintentional similarity to "Come Softly to Me" by The Fleetwoods. Sedaka recalled in 2019 that he had originally conceived the title of the song in 1961, but that Greenfield stalled for several months, not wanting to complete a lyric until Sedaka pressed him to do so.

Described by AllMusic as "two minutes and sixteen seconds of pure pop magic," "Breaking Up Is Hard to Do" hit No.1 on the Billboard Hot 100 on August 11, 1962, and peaked at No.12 on the Hot R&B Sides chart. The single was a solid hit all over the world, reaching No. 7 in the UK, sometimes with the text translated into foreign languages. For example, the Italian version was called "Tu non lo sai" ("You Don't Know") and was recorded by Sedaka himself.

On this version, background vocals on the song are performed by the female group the Cookies.

The personnel on the original recording session included: Al Casamenti, Art Ryerson, and Charles Macy on guitar; Ernie Hayes on piano; George Duvivier on bass; Gary Chester on drums; Artie Kaplan on saxophone; George Devens and Phil Kraus on percussion; Seymour Barab and Morris Stonzek on cellos; and David Gulliet, Joseph H. Haber, Harry Kohon, David Sackson, and Louis Stone on violins.

== Charts ==
=== Weekly charts ===
Chart (1962)	Peak position
Argentina	3
Australia	19
Canada (CHUM Hit Parade)	1
New Zealand (Lever Hit Parade)	1
UK	7
US Billboard Hot 100	1
US Cash Box Top 100	1

=== Year-end charts ===
Chart (1962)	Rank
US Billboard Hot 100	15
US Cash Box Top 100	32

== The Happenings version ==
"Breaking Up Is Hard to Do"

Single by the Happenings

from the album The Happenings Golden Hits
- B-side: "Anyway"
- Released: June 1968
- Recorded: 1968
- Genre: Pop
- Length: 2:20
- Label: B.T. Puppy
- Songwriters: Neil Sedaka, Howard Greenfield

The Happenings singles chronology
"Sealed with a Kiss" (1968)	"Breaking Up Is Hard to Do" (1968)	"Crazy Rhythm" (1968)

In 1968, American sunshine pop and cover band The Happenings covered the song for their 1968 album, "The Happenings Golden Hits", in which the cover was a minor hit. Released in June 1968 on B.T. Puppy Records, the song reached Number 67 on the US Billboard Hot 100 and Number 56 on the Canadian RPM charts.

== Lenny Welch version ==
"Breaking Up Is Hard to Do"

Single by Lenny Welch
- B-side: "Get Mommy to Come Back Home"
- Released: January 1970
- Recorded: 1969
- Genre: Pop
- Length: 2:20
- Label: CUR
- Songwriters: Neil Sedaka, Howard Greenfield

Lenny Welch singles chronology
"Halfway to Your Arms" (1968)	"Breaking Up Is Hard to Do" (1970)	"To Be Loved" (1970)

Though it was originally an uptempo song, Lenny Welch (best known for his 1963 hit version of "Since I Fell for You") re-recorded the song, reimagined as a torch ballad. Welch had approached Sedaka to see if he had any songs in his repertoire that fit Welch's style; as most of the songs Sedaka had written with his usual partner Howard Greenfield were upbeat pop songs, he did not, but playing around on the piano, he discovered "Breaking Up is Hard to Do" worked well as a slow ballad, so he wrote a new introduction and offered it to Welch. It peaked at No. 34 on the US Billboard charts and No. 8 on the easy listening chart in January 1970. It was Welch's third and final top-40 pop hit, and his first since 1964.

== Sedaka's 1975 version ==
"Breaking Up Is Hard to Do"

Single by Neil Sedaka

from the album Overnight Success (UK) The Hungry Years (US)
- B-side: "Nana's Song" (US); "Lonely Night" (UK); "Stephen" (Australia)
- Released: December 1975
- Genre: Soft rock
- Length: 3:14
- Label: Rocket (US); Polydor (Int'l)
- Songwriters: Neil Sedaka; Howard Greenfield
- Producers: Neil Sedaka; Robert Appere

Neil Sedaka singles chronology
"Bad Blood" (1975)	"Breaking Up Is Hard to Do" (1975)	"Love in the Shadows" (1976)

Five years after Welch's successful cover, Sedaka, in the midst of a comeback in his native United States after several years in career decline and a detour through the United Kingdom, re-recorded his signature song in the same style that Welch used. The song begins with the first few bars of Sedaka's 1962 recording, before fading and segueing into the slow version. Sedaka's slow version peaked at No. 8 in February 1976 and went to No. 1 on the Easy Listening chart. It was one of only a few times an artist made the Billboard Top Ten with two different versions of the same song. Sedaka has credited Welch's song "Since I Fell for You" as well as The Showmen and Dinah Washington as his inspiration for the new rendition.

=== Charts ===
==== Weekly charts ====
Chart (1975–1976)	Peak position
Australia KMR	48
Canada RPM Top Singles	1
Canada RPM Adult Contemporary	1
US Billboard Hot 100	8
US Billboard Adult Contemporary	1
US Cash Box Top 100	7

==== Year-end charts ====
Chart (1976)	Rank
Canada RPM Top Singles	30
US Billboard Hot 100	91
US Billboard Easy Listening	18
US Cash Box Top 100	75

== The Partridge Family version ==
"Breaking Up Is Hard to Do"

Single by The Partridge Family

from the album At Home with Their Greatest Hits
- B-side: "I'm Here, You're Here"
- Released: June 1972
- Genre: Pop
- Label: Bell
- Songwriter: Neil Sedaka
- Producer: Wes Farrell

The Partridge Family singles chronology
"Am I Losing You" (1972)	"Breaking Up Is Hard to Do" (1972)	"Looking Through the Eyes of Love" (1972)

Apart from Sedaka's own reworking of the song, by far the most successful cover of "Breaking Up Is Hard to Do" was done by the Partridge Family in 1972. While only a medium hit in North America, their version reached No. 3 in both the UK and Australia. Their version was never released in stereo until the 2013 Bell/Legacy release, Playlist: The Very Best of the Partridge Family.

=== Charts ===
==== Weekly charts ====
Chart (1972)	Peak position
Australia (KMR)	3
Canada RPM Top Singles	18
Ireland (IRMA)	2
New Zealand	11
South Africa	19
UK Singles	3
US Billboard Hot 100	28
US Billboard Adult Contemporary	30
US Cash Box Top 100	25

==== Year-end charts ====
Chart (1972)	Rank
Australia	18
UK	23
US (Joel Whitburn's Pop Annual)	197

== French version ==
"Moi je pense encore à toi"

Single by Claude François

from the album Dis-lui
- Language: French
- English title: I Still Think of You
- Released: October 1962
- Recorded: Summer–fall 1962
- Genre: Chanson, yé-yé, rock and roll
- Length: 2:20
- Label: Fontana
- Songwriters: Neil Sedaka, Howard Greenfield, André Salvet, Georges Aber

Claude François singles chronology
"Moi je pense encore à toi" (1962)	"Le Nabout Twist" (1962)

"Moi je pense encore à toi"

Single by Sylvie Vartan

from the album Sylvie
- B-side: "M'amuser"
- Released: November 1962
- Recorded: Late 1962
- Genre: Pop
- Length: 2:18
- Label: RCA Victor
- Songwriters: Neil Sedaka, Howard Greenfield, André Salvet, Georges Aber

Sylvie Vartan singles chronology
"Le Loco-motion" (1962)	"Moi je pense encore à toi" (1962)	"Chance" (1963)

"Breaking Up Is Hard to Do" was adapted into French in late 1962 by André Salvet and Georges Aber as "Moi je pense encore à toi" (meaning "I Still Think of You"). The French adaption was first recorded and released by singer Claude François in October 1962 but failed to chart, however, one month later, a cover by French singer Sylvie Vartan would follow and would reach Number 12 on the French Belgian charts in early December 1962 and would be later featured on Vartan's debut album, Sylvie, around the same time.

== See also ==
- List of Hot 100 number-one singles of 1962 (U.S.)
- List of number-one adult contemporary singles of 1976 (U.S.)
