= Neil Sedaka =

American singer-songwriter (1939–2026)

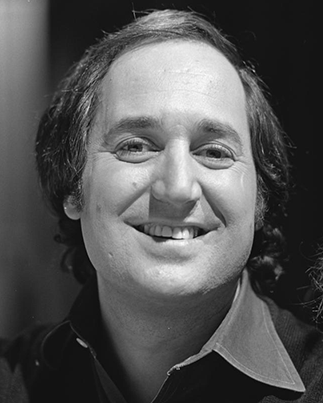
- Sedaka on TopPop in 1974

Background information
- Born: March 13, 1939; New York City, U.S.
- Died: February 27, 2026 (aged 86) Los Angeles, California, U.S.
- Genres: Pop; Brill Building; rock and roll; doo-wop; soft rock
- Occupations: Singer; songwriter; pianist
- Instruments: Vocals; piano
- Years active: 1957–2026
- Labels: RCA Victor; MGM; Polydor; Rocket; Elektra; Neil Sedaka Music; Razor & Tie
- Formerly of: The Tokens
- Website: neilsedaka.com

Neil Sedaka (/səˈdækə/; March 13, 1939 – February 27, 2026) was an American singer, songwriter, and pianist. Beginning his music career in 1957, he sold millions of records worldwide and wrote or co-wrote over 500 songs for himself and other artists, collaborating mostly with lyricists Howard Greenfield and Phil Cody.

After a short-lived tenure as a founding member of the doo-wop group the Tokens, Sedaka achieved a string of hit singles over the late 1950s and early 1960s, including "Oh! Carol" (1959), "Calendar Girl" (1960), "Happy Birthday Sweet Sixteen" (1961), and "Breaking Up Is Hard to Do" (1962). His popularity declined by the mid-1960s, but was revived in the mid-1970s, solidified by the 1975 U.S. Billboard Hot 100 number ones "Laughter in the Rain" and "Bad Blood". Sedaka maintained a successful career as a songwriter, penning hits for other artists including "Stupid Cupid" (Connie Francis), "(Is This the Way to) Amarillo" (Tony Christie), and "Love Will Keep Us Together" (Captain & Tennille). He was inducted into the Songwriters Hall of Fame in 1983 and continued to perform, including in a series of mini-concerts on social media during the COVID-19 pandemic, until his death in 2026.

== Early life and education ==
Sedaka was born on March 13, 1939, in Brooklyn. His father, Mordechai "Mac" Sedaka, was a taxi driver of Lebanese Jewish descent. Sedaka's paternal grandparents came to the United States from Istanbul in 1910. The family name was derived from "tzedakah", Hebrew for charity. Sedaka's mother, Eleanor (née Appel), was an Ashkenazi Jew of Polish and Russian descent. He grew up in the Brighton Beach neighborhood of Brooklyn, where he lived across the street from Neil Diamond and dated Carole King. "We all lived in Brooklyn," he said. "It was a wonderful time. It must have been something in the egg cream. We used to hang out in the sweet shop and have egg creams and potato knishes."

Sedaka demonstrated musical aptitude in his second-grade choral class and, when his teacher sent a note home suggesting he take piano lessons, his mother took a part-time job in an Abraham & Straus department store for six months to pay for a second-hand upright piano. In 1947, he auditioned successfully for a piano scholarship to the Juilliard School of Music's Preparatory Division for Children, which he attended on Saturdays. His mother had wanted him to become a classical pianist like his contemporary, Van Cliburn, and Sedaka continued to show fondness for (and capacity to play) classical music throughout his life.

At the same time, to his mother's dismay, Sedaka was discovering pop music; his mother eventually acquiesced when Sedaka received a five-figure royalty check for his hit "Calendar Girl" in 1961. When Sedaka was 13, a neighbor heard him playing and introduced him to her 16-year-old son, Howard Greenfield, an aspiring poet and lyricist. They became two of the Brill Building's composers.

Sedaka attended Abraham Lincoln High School in Brooklyn, from which he graduated at the age of 17 in 1956.

Sedaka and Greenfield wrote songs together throughout much of their young lives. Before rock and roll became popular, Sedaka and Greenfield found inspiration from show tunes. When Sedaka became a major teen pop star, the pair continued writing hits for Sedaka and numerous other artists.

When the Beatles and the British Invasion took American music in a different direction, Sedaka was left without a recording career. In the early 1970s, he decided a major change in his life was necessary and moved his family to the United Kingdom. Sedaka and Greenfield mutually agreed to end their partnership with "Our Last Song Together". Sedaka began a new composing partnership with lyricist Phil Cody.

== Career ==
=== Rise to fame with RCA Victor: the late 1950s ===
After graduating from Abraham Lincoln High School, Sedaka and some of his classmates formed a band called the Linc-Tones. The band had minor regional hits with songs like "While I Dream", "I Love My Baby", "Come Back, Joe", and "Don't Go", before Sedaka launched his solo career and left the group in 1957. The Linc-Tones, later renamed the Tokens near the end of Sedaka's tenure with the group, went on to have four top-40 hits of their own without Sedaka. Sedaka's first three solo singles, "Laura Lee", "Ring-a-Rockin'", and "Oh, Delilah!" failed to become hits (although "Ring-a-Rockin'" earned him the first of many appearances on Dick Clark's American Bandstand), but they demonstrated his ability to perform as a solo act and Sedaka was signed to a recording contract with RCA Victor.

Sedaka's first single for RCA Victor, "The Diary", was inspired by Connie Francis, one of Sedaka and Greenfield's most important clients, while the three were taking a temporary break during their idea-making for a new song. Francis was writing in her diary, Sedaka asked if he could read it, and Connie said no. After Little Anthony and the Imperials passed on the song, Sedaka recorded it himself, and his debut single hit the top 15 on the Billboard Hot 100, peaking at No. 14 in 1958.

His second single, a novelty tune titled "I Go Ape", just missed the top 40, peaking at No. 42, but it became a more successful single in the United Kingdom at No. 9. The third single, "Crying My Heart Out for You", was a commercial failure, missing the Hot 100 entirely, peaking at No. 111 but reaching No. 6 on the pop charts in Italy. RCA Victor had lost money on "I Go Ape" and "Crying My Heart Out for You" and was ready to drop Sedaka; Sedaka feared he was headed for one-hit wonder status. His manager, Al Nevins, persuaded the RCA Victor executives to give him one more chance.

Sedaka then bought the three biggest hit singles of the time and listened to them repeatedly, studying the song structure, chord progressions, lyrics, and harmonies before writing his next songs. "Oh! Carol" delivered Sedaka his first domestic top 10 hit, reaching No. 9 on the Hot 100 in 1959 and going to No. 1 on the Italian pop charts in 1960, giving Sedaka his first No. 1 ranking. In the UK, the song spent a total of 17 weeks in the top 40, peaking at No. 3 (for four weeks). In addition, the B-side, "One Way Ticket", reached No. 1 on the pop charts in Japan. Sedaka had dated Carole King when he was still at high school, which gave him the idea of using her name in the song. Gerry Goffin—King's husband—took the tune and wrote the playful response "Oh! Neil", which King recorded and released as an unsuccessful single the same year.

=== Big hits in the early 1960s ===
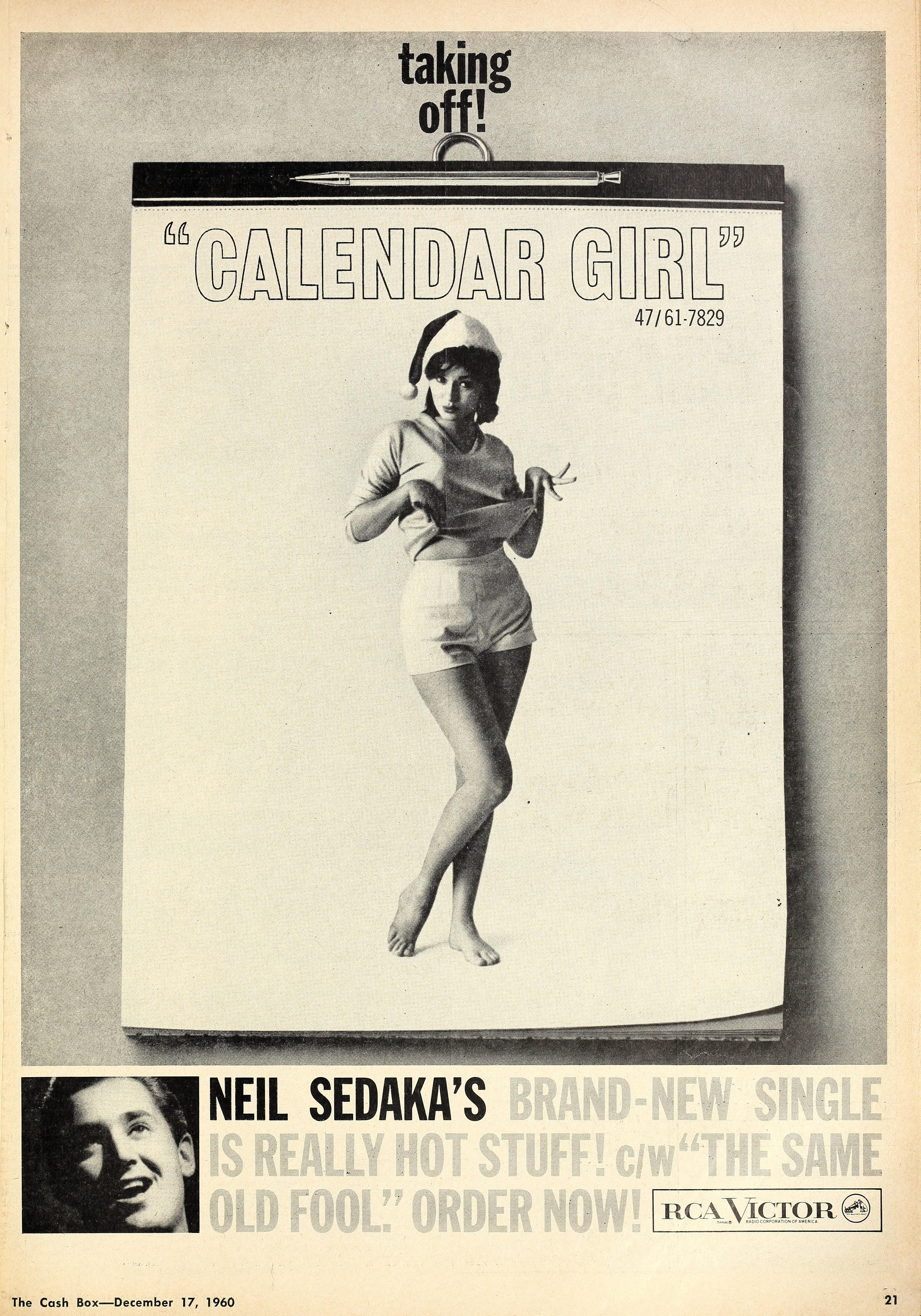
Cashbox advertisement, December 17, 1960

After establishing himself in 1958, Sedaka wrote many more hits from 1960 to 1962. His flow of top 30 hits during this period included: "Stairway to Heaven" (No. 9, 1960); "You Mean Everything to Me" (No. 17, 1960); "Run Samson Run" (No. 27, 1960); "Calendar Girl" (No. 4, 1961; also reached No. 1 on the Japanese and Canadian pop charts); "Little Devil" (No. 11, 1961); "Happy Birthday Sweet Sixteen" (No. 6, 1961); his signature song, "Breaking Up Is Hard to Do" (No. 1, two weeks: August 11 and 18, 1962); and "Next Door to an Angel" (No. 5, 1962). For several of those songs, Sedaka was paired with Stan Applebaum and His Orchestra. Sedaka singles not making the top 30 during this period included "Sweet Little You" (No. 59, 1961) and "King of Clowns" (No. 45, 1962). RCA Victor issued four LPs of his works in the United States and Great Britain during this period, and also produced Scopitone and Cinebox videos of "Calendar Girl" in 1961, "Breaking Up Is Hard to Do" in 1962, and "The Dreamer" in 1963. His second LP, Circulate (1961), contained mostly older pop standards from the 1930s, 1940s, and 1950s. He made regular appearances on such TV programs as American Bandstand and Shindig! during this period.

=== Writing for other performers ===
==== Connie Francis ====
When Sedaka was not recording his own songs, he and Howard Greenfield were writing for other performers, most notably in their earliest days Connie Francis. Francis began searching for a new hit after her 1958 single "Who's Sorry Now?". She was introduced to Sedaka and Greenfield, who played for her every ballad they had written. Francis began writing in her diary while the two played the last of their songs. After they finished, Francis told them they wrote beautiful ballads but that they were too intellectual for the young generation. Greenfield suggested that they play a song they had written for the Shepherd Sisters. Sedaka protested that Francis would be insulted by being played such a puerile song, but Greenfield reminded him Francis had not accepted their other suggestions and they had nothing to lose. After Sedaka played "Stupid Cupid", Francis told them they had just played her new hit. Francis' rendition of the song reached No. 14 on the Billboard charts, while it topped the UK Singles Chart.

While Francis was writing in her diary, Sedaka asked her if he could read what she had written. Francis said no. This inspired Sedaka to write "The Diary", his own first hit single. Sedaka and Greenfield wrote many of Francis' hits, such as "Fallin'" and the "Theme from Where the Boys Are", the film in which she starred. This hit the Top 5 on the Billboard pop singles chart and Francis had several No. 1 singles. "Where the Boys Are" eventually became her signature song.

==== Jimmy Clanton ====
Sedaka and Greenfield also wrote some of Jimmy Clanton's hits, such as "Another Sleepless Night", "What Am I Gonna Do?", and "All the Words in the World". Sedaka himself recorded each of these three songs: "Another Sleepless Night" appears on his Rock With Sedaka debut album; "What Am I Gonna Do?" was the B-side of "Going Home to Mary Lou" and appeared on his 1961 album Neil Sedaka Sings "Little Devil" and His Other Hits; and "All the Words in the World" was recorded but was kept in the RCA Victor vaults until 1977, at the height of Sedaka's return to popularity, when it was released on the album Neil Sedaka: The '50s and '60s.

=== Session work ===
Sedaka also contributed some work as a session pianist during his heyday as a pop singer-songwriter. His piano playing is heard on "Dream Lover", Bobby Darin's 1959 hit.

=== Foreign-language recordings ===
Sedaka was very popular in Italy. Many of his English-language records were released there and proved quite successful, especially "Crying My Heart Out for You" (Italian No. 6, 1959) and "Oh! Carol" (Italian No. 1, 1960).

In 1961, Sedaka began to record some of his hits in Italian, starting with "Esagerata" and "Un giorno inutile", local versions of "Little Devil" and "I Must Be Dreaming", respectively. Other recordings followed, such as "Tu non lo sai" ("Breaking Up Is Hard to Do"), "Il re dei pagliacci" ("King of Clowns"), "I tuoi capricci" ("Look Inside Your Heart"), and "La terza luna" ("Waiting for Never"). "La terza luna" reached No. 1 on the Italian pop charts in April 1963. Cinebox videos exist for "La terza luna" and "I tuoi capricci". Sedaka's Italian diction was impressive; his recordings in Italian had very little American accent. RCA Victor's Italiana branch distributed his records in Italy and released three compilation LPs of Sedaka's Italian recordings.

Sedaka also recorded an album in Yiddish (Brighton Beach Memories – Neil Sedaka Sings Yiddish), several songs in Spanish including "Mi Vecinita" ("Next Door to an Angel"), a handful of songs in German, and one single a piece in Hebrew, Japanese, and French. His English-language recordings were also quite popular internationally; "One-Way Ticket to the Blues" and "Calendar Girl" reached No. 1 on the Japanese pop charts in 1959 and 1961. He also enjoyed popularity in Latin America for his Spanish-language recordings. Many of these were pressed onto 78 rpm discs.

Sedaka stated in 2020 that he was talked into focusing on the international markets because Elvis Presley, the biggest rock star in America, never toured overseas (largely because of Colonel Tom Parker's desire to avoid immigration officials), and because his publishers and managers considered it a much lower risk for a new performer not to face American audiences who knew him.

=== Mid-1960s ===
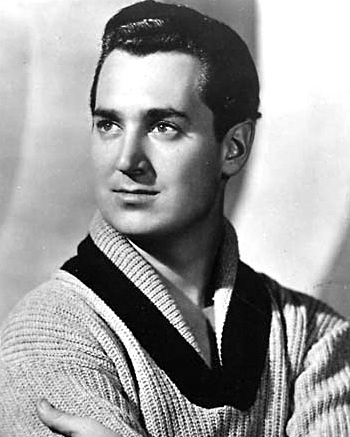
Sedaka in 1965

The year 1962 was one of the most important of Sedaka's career, with "Breaking Up Is Hard to Do" reaching No. 1 and "Next Door to an Angel" reaching No. 5. After this his popularity began to wane and his 1963 singles enjoyed only moderate success: "Alice in Wonderland" (No. 17), "Let's Go Steady Again" (No. 26), "The Dreamer" (No. 47), and "Bad Girl" (No. 33). "Bad Girl" was Sedaka's last top 40 hit in the U.S. until 1974.

In 1964, Sedaka's career began a sharp decline, hastened by the Beatles' arrival on the radio and TV, and the rest of the British Invasion. When describing the Beatles' effect on his career in the mid-1960s, Sedaka put it brusquely: "The Beatles—not good!" He would later describe it in 2023: "after five years of hits... the bottom fell out." From 1964 to 1966, only three of his singles cracked the Hot 100: "Sunny" (No. 86, 1964), "The World through a Tear" (No. 76, 1965), and "The Answer to My Prayer" (No. 89, 1965). His other singles from this era—"The Closest Thing to Heaven", "I Hope He Breaks Your Heart", "Let the People Talk", "The Answer Lies Within", and "We Can Make It If We Try"—all missed the Hot 100, the same fate as Sedaka's third U.S. single for RCA Victor, and became commercial failures.

To make matters worse, RCA Victor refused to release his then-new recording, "It Hurts to Be in Love", because he had not recorded the song at their own studios, as stipulated by his contract. Sedaka attempted another recording of this song in the RCA Victor studios, but the results were unsatisfactory. Howard Greenfield and Helen Miller, the song's co-writers, offered it instead to Gene Pitney. Pitney took the existing musical track, replacing Sedaka's lead vocal track with his own. Everything else was Sedaka, including his own arrangement and backing vocals, piano-playing, and usual female backup singers. Pitney ended up with a No. 7 hit for himself and his record label, Musicor, in 1964. Further exacerbating his situation, Sedaka discovered that his stepfather and manager had been squandering the earnings he had accrued from his years of success.

For the remainder of his tenure with RCA Victor, Sedaka never fully recovered from the effects of Beatlemania, the loss of "It Hurts to Be in Love" to Pitney, or the failure of his recordings. RCA Victor did not renew his contract when it expired in 1966, leaving Sedaka without a record label. He went into retirement as a performing artist.

Although Sedaka's stature as a recording artist was at a low ebb in the late 1960s, he was able to maintain his career through songwriting. Because his publisher, Aldon Music, was acquired by Screen Gems, two of his songs were recorded by the Monkees. Other hits Sedaka wrote in this period included the Cyrkle's versions of "We Had a Good Thing Goin'" and "Workin' On a Groovy Thing"; a top 40 R&B hit for Patti Drew in 1968; and a top 20 pop hit for the 5th Dimension in 1969. Also, "Make the Music Play" was included on Frankie Valli's charting album Timeless.

On a 1965 episode of the quiz show I've Got a Secret, Sedaka's secret was that he had been accepted to compete at the 1966 Tchaikovsky Competition in Moscow. Unaware of the secret, panelist Henry Morgan noted that Soviet bureaucracy had outlawed rock 'n' roll music, and that young Russians obtained Western music only by smuggling it into the country. After the secret was revealed, Sedaka performed Frederic Chopin's "Fantaisie Impromptu" for the panel. He did not ultimately appear in Moscow, and did not compete in the first round; by his own account he was disqualified because of his career as a pop singer.

Sedaka also made an appearance in the 1968 film Playgirl Killer, where he performed a song called "The Waterbug".

=== Struggles of the late 1960s to early 1970s ===
==== Australia years ====
Sedaka worked to revive his solo career in the early 1970s. Despite his waning chart appeal in the U.S. in the late 1960s, he remained very popular as a concert attraction, notably in the UK and Australia. In 2010, as a guest on Australian disc jockey Bob Rogers' radio show, he thanked Rogers and Australian music fans for standing by him during that challenging time: "You know, Bob, in my lean years—I called them 'The Hungry Years'—it was Bob Rogers and Australia who welcomed me." Sedaka made several trips to Australia to play cabaret dates, and his commercial comeback began when the single "Star-Crossed Lovers" became a major hit there. The song went to No. 1 nationally in April 1969—giving Sedaka his first charting single anywhere in four years. It also came in at No. 5 in Go-Set magazine's list of the Top 40 Australian singles of 1969. Later that year, with the support of Festival Records, he recorded a new LP of original material entitled Workin' on a Groovy Thing (released in the United Kingdom as Sounds of Sedaka) at Festival Studios in Sydney. It was co-produced by Festival staff producer Pat Aulton, with arrangements by John Farrar (who later achieved international fame for his work with Olivia Newton-John) and backing by Australian session musicians including guitarist Jimmy Doyle (Ayers Rock) and noted jazz musician-composer John Sangster. One of the tracks from the album, "Wheeling, West Virginia", reached No. 20 in Australia in early 1970. The album is also notable because it was Sedaka's first album to include collaborations with writers other than long-time lyricist Howard Greenfield; the title track featured lyrics by Roger Atkins and four other songs were co-written with Carole Bayer Sager.

==== Emergence and Solitaire ====
In 1971, Sedaka reunited with RCA and released the Emergence album, which Sedaka consistently described as his favorite album of his. Singles from that album included "I'm A Song (Sing Me)", "Silent Movies", "Superbird", and "Rosemary Blue". Good friend and New York music impresario Don Kirshner attempted to make the U.S. release of "Emergence" a comeback for Sedaka, but the album and single releases had no appreciable success, and RCA showed little interest in promoting the album. After the failure of "Emergence" in the U.S. market, Sedaka left New York and moved to England. He recalled in 2025 how someone had spotted him on the street during this time period and said "Hey, you used to be Neil Sedaka!" Sedaka brusquely retorted "I still AM Neil Sedaka, you b****!"

In 1972, Sedaka embarked on a successful British tour with Cissy Houston and was introduced by Harvey Lisberg to the four future members of 10cc (best known to American audiences for "I'm Not in Love" and "The Things We Do for Love") with whom he recorded the Solitaire album at their Strawberry Studios in Stockport issued by RCA in 1972. As well as the title track, "Solitaire", which was successfully covered by Andy Williams (UK Top 5 singles chart) and the Carpenters (U.S. Top 20), it included two UK Top 40 singles, one of which ("Beautiful You") also charted briefly in the United States, Sedaka's first U.S. chart appearance in ten years. "Solitaire" was the first collaboration between Sedaka and Phil Cody, whom Sedaka felt was an ideal lyricist for writing music in the singer-songwriter period; Sedaka and Cody "clicked" as songwriters and began a prolonged collaboration. Sedaka took a different approach to songwriting with Cody compared to Greenfield, with whom he was arguing frequently near the end of their collaboration; whereas he allowed Greenfield in the studio during recording, he met with Cody off-site to write songs. Cody did not consider Sedaka to be a personal friend; he mainly saw his work with Sedaka as a work project to bring the singer into the modern era.

=== Return to success in the mid-1970s ===
==== Newfound success ====
A year later, Sedaka reconvened with the Strawberry team, who had by then charted with their own debut 10cc album, to record The Tra-La Days Are Over for MGM Records, which started the second phase of his career and included his original version of the hit song "Love Will Keep Us Together" (also a U.S. No. 1 hit two years later for Captain & Tennille). This album also marked the effective end of his writing partnership with Greenfield, commemorated by the track "Our Last Song Together" (later the last hit song for both Bo Donaldson and the Heywoods and Bobby Sherman, whose versions hit No. 95 and No. 103 respectively). They reunited, however, and composed together again, before Greenfield's death in 1986. From 1974 onward, Sedaka's records were issued in Europe and around the world on the Polydor label. His first album of new material with Polydor was Laughter in the Rain (1974).

In late 1972, producer Stig Anderson approached Sedaka to write the lyrics for a single by a new Swedish pop quartet then known as Björn & Benny, Agnetha & Anni-Frid. Sedaka agreed, on the condition he liked the song. Anderson, who had co-written the Swedish original with lyricist Björn Ulvaeus and composer Benny Andersson, intended to enter "Ring Ring" in the 1973 Eurovision Song Contest and believed with strong English lyrics it had the potential to become an international hit. He sent a tape of the song together with a rough translation to Sedaka, who within days returned original lyrics, co-written with Phil Cody. The song was entered into the Swedish Eurovision selections on February 10, 1973, but placed third. The band, later renamed ABBA, made "Ring Ring" the title track of their first album, released on March 26, 1973. The single, credited to Andersson, Ulvaeus, Anderson, Sedaka, and Cody, reached number 1 in Sweden and Belgium, and charted in the top 5 in at least four other countries. Sedaka later said that ABBA's "songwriting and production are in a class by themselves."

Darby Crash referred to Sedaka as "the real godfather of punk" due to his unaffected, simple chord progressions and unpretentious lyrics, saying that "Calendar Girl" "had all of punk right there-you just had to get high and play that pure rock and roll just like that."

==== Career with The Rocket Record Company ====
Elton John and Sedaka met at a party in London in 1973. When John learned Sedaka had no American record label, he suggested Sedaka sign with his Rocket Record Company, Limited, and Sedaka accepted the proposition. When John visited Sedaka at his London apartment, they discussed plans for relaunching his career in the United States.

John said he had "always been a Sedaka fan anyway". He went on to say:

So the basic plan was as simple as finding out what he wanted to have on his album—which turned out to be a compilation from his British albums. It had been like Elvis coming up and giving us the chance to release his records. We couldn't believe our luck.

==== Sedaka's Back ====
Sedaka returned to the U.S. album charts with the release of Sedaka's Back, a compilation of songs from three albums he had already recorded in the UK—namely "Solitaire", "The Tra-La Days Are Over", and "Laughter in the Rain". It was only the second Sedaka album ever to chart in the U.S. Sedaka was known principally as a singles artist up to that point in his career; his only other American charting album was Neil Sedaka Sings His Greatest Hits, a compilation of his early singles. Although the single was released in the autumn of 1974 and was very slow in building in sales and at radio, eventually Sedaka found himself once again topping the Billboard Hot 100 singles chart (February 1, 1975) with "Laughter in the Rain". It was Sedaka's second No. 1 single thus far at that point in his career (after 1962's original version of "Breaking Up Is Hard to Do") and solidly reestablished Sedaka's popularity in America. Sedaka followed the success of "Laughter in the Rain" with a more politically motivated song, "The Immigrant", inspired by the songwriters' parents and by John Lennon, then facing immigration issues at the time. "The Immigrant" reached number 22 but topped the easy listening charts. Sedaka was disappointed by the underperformance of "The Immigrant" on the pop charts and the resistance he faced from radio stations unwilling to risk controversy over the song, particularly considering that his own composition "Love Will Keep Us Together" (in a cover version by the Captain & Tennille, who acknowledged Sedaka in the backing lyrics) went to number one at the same time; Sedaka acknowledged he had misjudged Americans' taste. Captain & Tennille also achieved a top-50 hit with a Spanish version of "Love Will Keep Us Together;" "Por Amor Viviremos" reached number 49.

==== Overnight Success/The Hungry Years ====
In late 1975, Sedaka's most successful year of his career continued as he earned yet more chart success with the release of his second Rocket Records album, The Hungry Years. This album was a U.S. edition of Sedaka's British Polydor album Overnight Success. The first single, "Bad Blood", hit No. 1 on the Billboard 100 and stayed there for three weeks (October 11, 18 and 25, 1975), was certified Gold by the Recording Industry Association of America (RIAA), and was the most commercially successful individual single of his career. Elton John provided uncredited backing vocals for "Bad Blood". Despite their later falling out that resulted in Sedaka moving from Elton's Rocket Records to Elektra, Sedaka credited John as being responsible for his successful return to the U.S. pop music scene. John has stated, "I only appear on the records of people I really know or like."

Another highlight from The Hungry Years was Sedaka's new version of "Breaking Up Is Hard to Do". His 1962 original, a No. 1 hit single, was upbeat; the remake was a slow ballad, which Sedaka had arranged for Lenny Welch five years prior. Sedaka's version hit No. 8 on the Hot 100 in early 1976, making him the only artist to ever record an entirely reinterpreted version of a song where both versions reached the Billboard Top 10. (Welch's version had reached No. 34.) The 1976 ballad version also hit No. 1 on Billboard's Adult Contemporary chart.

==== Steppin' Out ====
Later in 1976, Sedaka released a third and final album with Elton John's label The Rocket Record Company, Steppin' Out. The first single, "Love in the Shadows", was an uncharacteristically solid rock song featuring a scorching guitar solo. While it peaked at No. 16 on the Hot 100, it was the first of his three "comeback" albums' debut singles not to hit No. 1, or even the Top 10. The second single was the album's title track, once again featuring Elton on uncredited backing vocals. While it cracked the Top 40 (peaking at No. 36), it also marked the beginning of a slowdown in Sedaka's music sales and radio play, not unlike what he experienced in 1964 when The Beatles and the British Invasion arrived. Sedaka subsequently left Rocket and signed with Elektra Records.

Sedaka met John again several times after his departure from Rocket, and he described their meetings as "cordial, but cold". The ice eventually thawed, however, and in the foreword to Sedaka's 2013 biography, John wrote of their friendship in glowing and positive terms.

=== Late 1970s ===
==== Transition from Rocket to Elektra ====
Sedaka recorded four albums for Elektra Records: A Song (which produced the adult contemporary hits "Alone at Last" and a recording of "Amarillo"), All You Need Is the Music, In the Pocket, and Neil Sedaka Now. The only top-40 pop hit to emerge from the Elektra records, as well as Sedaka's last to date, was "Should've Never Let You Go", a duet between Sedaka and his daughter Dara, which had appeared on In the Pocket in 1980.

==== Reissue of RCA Victor recordings ====
Throughout the 1970s, RCA Records, Sedaka's former label, reissued his 1960s recordings on compilation LPs on the RCA Victor and budget RCA Camden labels. Sedaka released a final album of new material for RCA, consisting of a live concert he gave in Sydney. In 1974, the album was issued by RCA in Australia and Europe as Neil Sedaka On Stage.

=== 1980s ===
Mac Sedaka, Neil's father, died on June 6, 1981, of metastatic colon cancer; Neil was at his bedside singing his father's favorite song, Sedaka's 1965 song "Pictures From The Past", when his father briefly awoke from his coma before his death. Sedaka re-recorded the song that same year.

Sedaka left Elektra and signed with Curb Records. Sedaka recorded two albums on the Curb label – Come See About Me, an album of cover versions of songs, in 1983 and The Good Times in 1986. Neither of these albums fared well on the charts or in terms of sales, with only modest success for the singles that were released from them (another duet with Dara, a cover of "Your Precious Love", reached the adult contemporary charts); Sedaka left Curb in 1986.

=== Other successes ===
American singer-songwriter Ben Folds credited Sedaka on his iTunes Originals album as an inspiration for his own song-publishing career. When Folds heard that Sedaka had a song published by the age of 13, Folds set a similar goal, despite the fact that Sedaka did not actually publish until he was 16.

In 1985, songs composed by Sedaka were adapted for the Japanese anime television series Mobile Suit Zeta Gundam. These included the two opening themes "Zeta-Toki wo Koete" (based on Sedaka's "Better Days Are Coming") and "Mizu no Hoshi e Ai wo Komete" (originally in English as "For Us to Decide", but the English version was never recorded), as well as the end theme "Hoshizora no Believe" (based on Sedaka's "Bad and Beautiful"). Due to copyright restrictions, the songs were replaced for the North American DVD, as well as for Japanese online releases of the series until 2017.

On July 26, 1993, Sedaka performed in South Bend, Indiana as part of the Firefly Festival.

In 1994, Sedaka provided the voice for Neil Moussaka, a parody of himself in Food Rocks, an attraction at Epcot from 1994 to 2006.

A musical comedy based on the songs of Sedaka, Breaking Up Is Hard to Do, was written in 2005 by Erik Jackson and Ben H. Winters; it is now under license to Theatrical Rights Worldwide.

A biographical musical, Laughter in the Rain, produced by Bill Kenwright and Laurie Mansfield and starring Wayne Smith as Sedaka, had its world premiere at the Churchill Theatre in the London borough of Bromley on March 4, 2010. Sedaka attended the opening and joined the cast onstage for an impromptu curtain call of the title song.

=== Into the 21st century ===
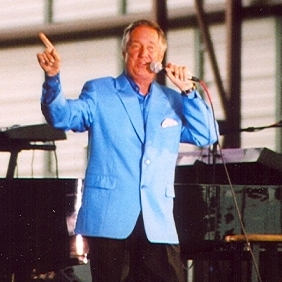
Sedaka performing in 2005

Sedaka was inducted into the Songwriters Hall of Fame in 1983, has a star on the Hollywood Walk of Fame, and was an October 2006 inductee of the Long Island Music Hall of Fame. On November 15, 2013, Pacific Pioneer Broadcasters in Los Angeles gave him their Art Gilmore Career Achievement Award at a luncheon in his honor.

==== American Idol ====
In May 2003, near the end of the second season of the Fox TV series American Idol, Sedaka appeared as a guest judge and mentor to the five remaining finalists. Third-place finalist Kimberley Locke sang the Sedaka/Greenfield composition "Theme from Where the Boys Are".

Season 2 runner-up Clay Aiken chose Sedaka's 1972 song "Solitaire" for his performance. As Aiken explained to the studio and TV audiences, host Ryan Seacrest, and the four regular judges, "Solitaire" had long been one of his mother's all-time favorite songs. When she learned that Sedaka was going to be a guest judge and that the finalists would be singing Sedaka's songs, she begged Clay to sing "Solitaire". The performance was uniformly given extraordinarily high praise by the judges. Sedaka told Aiken that he officially passed ownership of the performance of "Solitaire" to Clay, offering to record and produce a single of the song or an entire CD with him.

Although it did not appear on his debut CD itself, Aiken recorded and added "Solitaire" as the B-side to the single "The Way", whose sales were faltering. "Solitaire" was quickly moved to the A-side, and radio airplay and single and download sales responded immediately. "Solitaire" hit No. 1 on the Billboard Hot Singles Sales chart and was, in fact, the top-selling single for all of 2004. It also hit the Top 5 on Billboard's Hot 100. Sedaka was invited back to American Idol to celebrate the success of "Solitaire" several times, as it continued to reach new milestones. Since then, Aiken has mined the Sedaka songbook again, recording a cover of probably Sedaka's best-known song, "Breaking Up Is Hard to Do", on the "deluxe version" of his 2010 CD release, Tried and True.

==== Amarillo – Guinness World Record ====
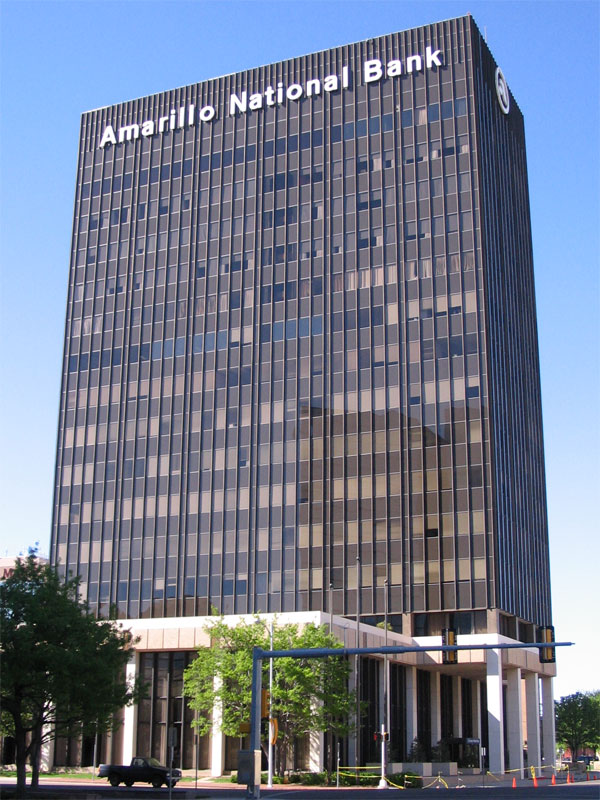
Amarillo National Bank Plaza One building

On a business trip to New York in mid-1971, Harvey Lisberg, who was a longtime fan of Sedaka, asked Don Kirshner if he'd written anything new. Kirshner took Lisberg to a small room with a piano where Sedaka was already seated, and he tapped out a few songs. One of these was the Sedaka/Greenfield composition "(Is This the Way to) Amarillo" which Lisberg loved and placed with his artist Tony Christie who recorded and released it in 1971. The song did relatively well on the UK Singles Chart, reaching the Top 20, but a re-release in 2005 as a charity single for Comic Relief saw it reach No.1 as well as being the best-selling single of that year.

Sedaka released the song in the U.S. in 1977 as the shortened "Amarillo", but it was only a mid-chart entry, peaking just shy of the Top 40.

When interviewed for an "extras" feature for a DVD set of a concert filmed in London on April 7, 2006 (see below), Sedaka jokingly said that he had heard that Christie had retired and was "golfing in Spain." The sudden revival of "Amarillo" summoned Christie back to the UK for an unexpected return to fame. In early 2006, the song received new life yet again when a dance beat was added and the lyrics were revised to become a novelty hit, released as "Is This the Way to the (England) World Cup?", to mark the appearance of the England football team at that summer's FIFA World Cup finals.

On April 7, 2006, Sedaka was appearing at the Royal Albert Hall and filming for the aforementioned CD/DVD package, when he was interrupted mid-concert by a gentleman who walked onstage from the wings. The planned scenario was that Sedaka was to begin performing "Amarillo", and after one verse, the audience was to be surprised by the appearance of Christie for an eventual duet. At the interruption, a confused Sedaka asked, "What is this?" The interloper was a representative from Guinness World Records, and he was there to present Sedaka with an award from Guinness World Records: British Hit Singles and Albums for composing "(Is This the Way to) Amarillo", which at that point Guinness recognised as the most successful UK single of the 21st century so far. After the presentation, Sedaka proceeded into "Amarillo", Christie entered onstage to an eruption of cheers from the audience, and after the successful duet performance, the two men walked offstage together, triumphantly arm in arm, as the first half of Sedaka's concert came to a close.

==== New recording contract, new chart success ====
Since Sedaka had lost his recording contract in the mid-1980s, he had used his own business, Neil Sedaka Music, to finance the recording, production, and distribution of new CDs and repackaging of his existing catalog of music. Because of ongoing disputes with RCA Records over the ownership of Sedaka's original late 1950s and early 1960s hits, in 1991, Sedaka re-recorded those early recordings.

In early 2007, Sedaka signed his first recording contract in nearly two decades with Razor and Tie Records, a small-but-growing, New York–based independent label with a talent roster that also includes Joan Baez, Vanessa Carlton, Foreigner, Joe Jackson, and Ladysmith Black Mambazo. The first release was The Definitive Collection, a life-spanning compilation of his hits, along with outtakes and songs previously released but unavailable in CD or download format. It debuted in the Top 25 on Billboard's Top 200 Albums chart in May 2007, one of the highest-charting albums of his entire career. It also includes "It Hurts to Be in Love", Sedaka's version of the Gene Pitney hit.

Waking Up Is Hard to Do was Sedaka's next release with Razor and Tie, hitting the albums chart in May 2009. The CD was a children's album that used the melodies of many of Sedaka's best-known songs but changed the lyrics to fit the everyday lives of babies and toddlers, along with their parents, grandparents, babysitters, and other caregivers. The CD title is an example. Lastly, The Music of My Life entered the albums chart in February 2010 and comprised almost all new material. "Right or Wrong", co-written with original music partner Howard Greenfield, was done in traditional street-corner, layered doo-wop vocal harmonies with Sedaka overlaying his own voice to achieve the effect for which he was well known in his "early" heyday of the late 1950s and early 1960s. The final track, "You", had been previously released, but was remastered for this project and is one of several titles dedicated to his wife and career guide of over 50 years, Leba.

A concert performance on October 26, 2007, at Lincoln Center in New York City paid homage to the 50th anniversary of Sedaka's debut in show business. Music impresario (and producer for The Music of My Life track "Do You Remember?") David Foster served as emcee. Other guests included Captain & Tennille; Natalie Cole; Connie Francis; recording legend and decades-long Sedaka friend and former manager Don Kirshner; and new "Solitaire" "owner" Clay Aiken, among many others. Also in 2007, Donny Osmond released a CD, Love Songs of the '70s, which included a cover of Sedaka's 1975 No. 1 hit "Laughter in the Rain".

During his 2008 Australian tour, Sedaka premiered a new classical orchestral composition entitled "Joie de Vivre" (Joy of Life). Sedaka also traveled to the Philippines for his May 17, 2008, concert at the Araneta Coliseum.

On September 11, 2010, Sedaka performed to a TV audience in Hyde Park, London, the venue of the "Proms in the Park" for the BBC.

In early 2011, Sedaka recorded two duets ("Brighton" and "The Immigrant") with singer Jim Van Slyke for Van Slyke's Neil Sedaka tribute album, The Sedaka Sessions. LML Records released this album in August 2011.

In 2010, Sedaka duetted with West End (London) and Broadway theatre legend Elaine Paige, on their cover of "Make It with You", from Paige's UK release Elaine Paige and Friends. The track was originally a No. 1 hit on the Billboard Hot 100 pop charts for the soft-rock group Bread in 1970. In 2014, Sedaka duetted with Engelbert Humperdinck. The pair recorded the title song from Sedaka's 1975 album The Hungry Years. The track is from Engelbert's UK/USA release Engelbert Calling.

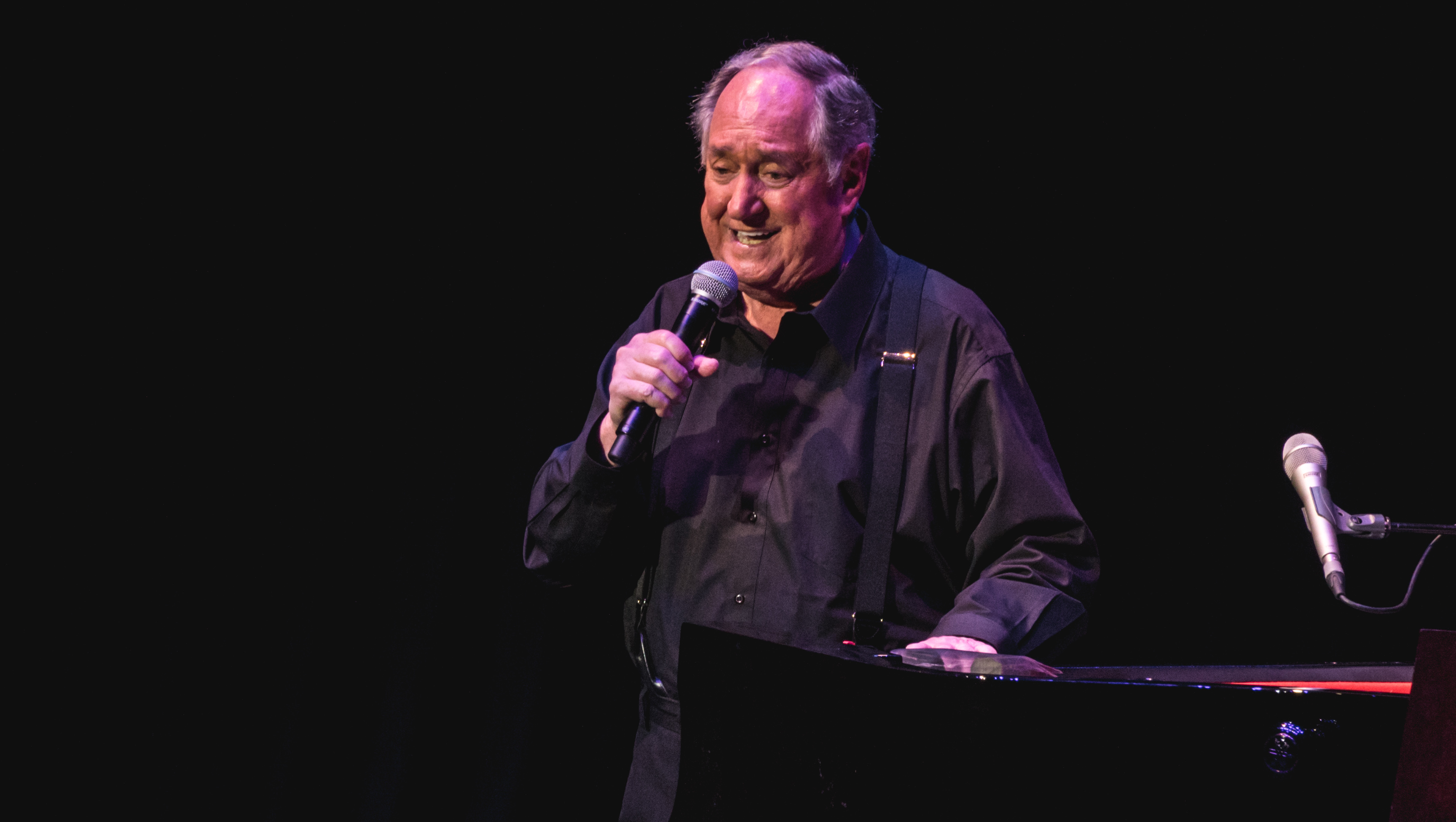
Sedaka performing in 2017

Also in 2014, Sedaka duetted with up-and-coming Nashville star Mary Sarah (Gross) on Connie Francis' classic, "Theme from Where the Boys Are", on her all-duets album Bridges. Mary Sarah was also a Season 10 (spring 2016) contestant on NBC's The Voice, and once again relied on Sedaka's "Where the Boys Are" for her blind audition. She turned all four chairs around, and ultimately placed seventh in the competition. In 2015, Sedaka duetted on his No. 1 hit from 1974 to 1975, "Laughter in the Rain", with Steve Tyrell, on Tyrell's 2015 album That Lovin' Feeling. In 2014, BBC Four broadcast the documentary, Neil Sedaka: King of Song, telling the story of the two distinct periods of success in his career.

On February 1, 2016, Sedaka performed to a sold-out audience in The Villages in Central Florida. Then, on August 12, 2016, Sedaka released his new acoustic album, I Do It for Applause, which includes 11 new tracks and a bonus of his first symphony which he had debuted in Australia in 2008, "Joie de Vivre (Joy of Life)"; the recording features the London Philharmonia Orchestra.

In April 2020, Sedaka launched a series of free mini-concerts, released through his social media channels, as a method of entertaining his fans during the COVID-19 pandemic. Each daily concert features three songs from Sedaka's discography. Sedaka paused the series in December owing to contracting COVID-19 himself, but resumed on a reduced schedule January 4, 2021, after recovering with no symptoms. Sedaka continued to produce short-form online content through the rest of his life, including guest duets with his grandson Mike Sedaka and doo-wop revivalist Elliot James Reay.

In 2024, Sedaka signed a deal with Primary Wave in an effort to revive interest in his catalog, which Primary Wave began reintroducing on streaming platforms, beginning with golden anniversary re-releases of his 1970s albums. In a 2025 interview, following his return to in-person concert performances for a limited engagement at Vitello's, an Italian restaurant in Studio City, Sedaka stated that he had retired from songwriting in 2022; he believed he could no longer write at the caliber he did at his peak.

== Personal life and death ==
Sedaka married Leba Strassberg in 1962. The couple had a daughter and a son. Sedaka's nephew, through his marriage to Strassberg, is CNN Politics writer Harry Enten.

Sedaka last appeared in public on February 25, 2026, while dining at a local restaurant, and had shown no signs of ill health. On the morning of February 27, 2026, he was hospitalized in Los Angeles after experiencing an undisclosed medical emergency and died later the same day, at the age of 86. The cause of his death was listed as atherosclerotic cardiovascular disease combined with kidney failure. He is buried at Beth Olam Cemetery (part of Hollywood Forever Cemetery) in Los Angeles.

== No. 1 hits ==
=== As a performer ===
- "Oh! Carol" (Italy, Netherlands and Wallonia), 1960
- "One-Way Ticket to the Blues" (Japan), 1960
- "Calendar Girl" (Canada & Japan), 1961
- "Breaking Up Is Hard to Do" (1962 version) – (Canada), US Billboard Hot 100, 1962, Grammy nomination for Best R&R performance
- "La terza luna" (Italy), 1963
- "Star Crossed Lovers" (Australia), 1969
- "Laughter in the Rain" – US Adult Contemporary, 1974; US Billboard Hot 100, 1975
- "The Immigrant" – US Adult Contemporary, 1975
- "Bad Blood" – US Billboard Hot 100, 1975–76, Grammy nomination for Best Pop Vocal Performance
- "Breaking Up Is Hard to Do" (1975 version) – US Adult Contemporary, 1976, Grammy Award nomination for Song of the Year

=== As a songwriter ===
- "Ring Ring" by ABBA (debut single) (English translation co-lyricist) – Belgium, 1973"
- "Solitaire" by The Carpenters (composer) – US Billboard Adult Contemporary, 1975
- "Lonely Night (Angel Face)" by Captain & Tennille (1975) (composer and lyricist) – (Canada), US Billboard Easy Listening
- "Love Will Keep Us Together" by Captain & Tennille (1975) (composer) – US Billboard Hot 100, Grammy Award nomination for Song of the Year

== Filmography ==
- 1967: Playgirl Killer (also known as Decoy for Terror)
- 1973: The Sonny & Cher Comedy Hour (one episode, as himself) (musical performance)
- 1975: The Midnight Special (as himself, guest host and musical performance)
- 1976: Saturday Night Live (one episode, as himself) (musical performance)
- 1977: The Carol Burnett Show (one episode, as himself)
- 1980: The Toni Tennille Show (one episode, as himself)
- 2005: The King of Queens (one episode, as himself)
- 2020–2026: Today's Mini-Concert (self-produced musical performance series)

== Autobiography ==
- Laughter in the Rain: My Own Story. New York: Putnam, 1982. ISBN 0-399-12744-5

== Sources ==
- Bloom, Ken. American Song: The Complete Musical Theater Companion 1877–1995, vol. 2, 2nd edition, Schirmer Books, 1996.
- Clarke, Donald. The Penguin Encyclopedia of Popular Music, Viking, 1989.
- diMartino, Dave. Singer-Songwriters, Pop Music's Performer-Composers, from A to Zevon, Billboard Books, 1984.
- Ewen, David. American Songwriters: An H. W. Wilson Biographical Dictionary, H. W. Wilson Company, 1987.
- Friedrich, Gary; Brown, Len. Encyclopedia of Rock & Roll, Tower Publications, 1970.
- Lablanc, Michael. Contemporary Musicians, vol. 4, Gale Research, 1991.
- Larkin, Colin. The Encyclopedia of Popular Music, Macmillan, 1992.
- Lyman, Darryl. Great Jews in Music, J. D. Publishers, 1986.
- Sadie, Stanley; Hitchcock, H. Wiley (ed.). The New Grove Dictionary of American Music. Grove's Dictionaries of Music, 1986.
- Stambler, Irwin. Encyclopedia of Pop, Rock and Soul, St. Martin's Press, 1974.
- Sumrall, Harry. Pioneers of Rock and Roll: 100 Artists Who Changed the Face of Rock, Billboard Books, 1994.
- White, Mark. You Must Remember This... Popular Songwriters 1900–1980, Frederick Warner, 1983.
