= The Very Best of Neil Sedaka =

Compilation album by Neil Sedaka
- Released: August 6, 2001
- Genre: Pop rock
- Label: RCA
- Producers: Al Nevins; Don Kirshner (original recordings); Paul Williams (compilation)

Neil Sedaka chronology
| The Singer and His Songs (2000) | The Very Best of Neil Sedaka (2001) | Let The Good Times In (2002) |

Professional ratings
Review scores
| Source | Rating |
|---|---|
| AllMusic | 4.5/5 stars |

The Very Best of Neil Sedaka is a 2001 compilation album issued by RCA Records as part of their commemorative "100th Anniversary" series of albums celebrating their biggest stars. The album features some of Sedaka's best-known hits during his days with RCA, recorded from 1958 to 1963.

== Track listing ==
All songs written by Neil Sedaka and Howard Greenfield.

1. "The Diary" (2:15)
2. "I Go Ape" (2:31)
3. "Oh! Carol" (2:16)
4. "Stairway to Heaven" (2:39)
5. "You Mean Everything to Me" (2:35)
6. "Run Samson Run" (2:51)
7. "Calendar Girl" (2:36)
8. "Little Devil" (2:42)
9. "Happy Birthday Sweet Sixteen" (2:37)
10. "Breaking Up Is Hard to Do" (2:17)
11. "Next Door to an Angel" (2:24)
12. "Alice in Wonderland" (2:31)
13. "Let's Go Steady Again" (2:46)
14. "Bad Girl" (2:38)

== Recording dates ==
- October 30, 1958– "The Diary"
- January 15, 1959– "I Go Ape"
- July 31, 1959– "Oh! Carol"
- February 5, 1960– "Stairway to Heaven", "Run Samson Run"
- February 8, 1960– "You Mean Everything to Me"
- October 24, 1960– "Calendar Girl"
- March 17, 1961– "Little Devil"
- October 5, 1961– "Happy Birthday Sweet Sixteen"
- February 9, 1962– "Breaking Up Is Hard to Do"
- August 30, 1962– "Next Door to an Angel"
- January 3, 1963– "Alice in Wonderland", "Let’s Go Steady Again"
- September 23, 1963– "Bad Girl"

== Personnel ==
=== Original recordings (1958–1963) ===
- Neil Sedaka – vocals
- Al Nevins – producer (all tracks)
- Don Kirshner – producer (tracks 4–14)
- Bob Pollard – A&R (track 1)
- Stan Applebaum – orchestra conductor (tracks 4–8, 14)
- Alan Lorber – arranger (tracks 9–14), conductor (tracks 9–13)

=== Compilation release (2001) ===
- Paul Williams – producer
- Bill Lacey – audio restoration
- Dennis Ferrante – digital transferring
- Michael Hill – liner notes
- Victoria Sarro – project director
- Jennifer Liebeskind – project research
- BMG Entertainment Archives – photography
- Frank Harkins – art direction
- JRJ Associates, Inc. – design
- Jon Bryant, Glenn Korman, Mike Panico, Rob Santos – special thanks
