= Neil Sedaka Sings His Greatest Hits =

- Original 1962 release

Greatest hits album by Neil Sedaka
- Released: 1962
- Recorded: 1958–1962
- Genre: Pop
- Label: RCA Victor
- Producers: Al Nevins; Don Kirshner

Neil Sedaka chronology
Neil Sedaka Sings Little Devil and His Other Hits (1961)	Neil Sedaka Sings His Greatest Hits (1962)	Three Great Guys (1963)

Neil Sedaka Sings His Greatest Hits is a 1962 compilation album of twelve of the most popular hits of Neil Sedaka's tenure with RCA Victor.

== Track listing ==
All songs written by Neil Sedaka and Howard Greenfield unless otherwise noted.

=== Side one ===
1. "Next Door To An Angel" (2:24)
2. "Oh! Carol" (2:16)
3. "King of Clowns" (2:40)
4. "Stairway to Heaven" (2:39)
5. "Run Samson Run" (2:51)
6. "Calendar Girl" (2:36)

=== Side two ===
1. "Breaking Up Is Hard to Do" (2:17)
2. "The Diary" (2:15)
3. "Happy Birthday Sweet Sixteen" (2:38)
4. "Little Devil" (2:42)
5. "Sweet Little You" (Barry Mann, Larry Kolber) (2:03)
6. "You Mean Everything to Me" (2:35)

== Recording dates ==
Sources:

- October 30, 1958– "The Diary"
- July 31, 1959– "Oh! Carol"
- February 5, 1960– "Stairway to Heaven", "Run Samson Run"
- February 8, 1960– "You Mean Everything to Me"
- October 24, 1960– "Calendar Girl"
- March 17, 1961– "Little Devil"
- July 10, 1961– "Sweet Little You"
- October 5, 1961– "Happy Birthday Sweet Sixteen"
- February 9, 1962– "King of Clowns", "Breaking Up Is Hard to Do"
- August 30, 1962– "Next Door to an Angel"

== Personnel ==
Sources:

- Neil Sedaka – vocals
- Al Nevins – producer (all tracks)
- Don Kirshner – producer (all tracks except 2 and 8)
- Stan Applebaum – orchestra conductor (tracks 4–6, 10–12), arranger (track 11)
- Alan Lorber – arranger/conductor (tracks 1, 3, 7, 9)

== Re-release ==
The album was re-released in 1975 and again in 1992.

Each release used different cover art. The original 1962 issue (shown above) featured a painting of a teenage girl admiring a photo of Sedaka on her nightstand. The 1975 second edition featured a 1970s-era photo of Sedaka in a tuxedo standing against a black background. The 1992 third edition, the first CD issue of this album, features a standard early-1960s publicity photo of Sedaka.
