= Breaking Up Is Hard to Do (musical) =

Breaking Up Is Hard To Do is a jukebox musical written by Erik Jackson and Ben H. Winters, based on the songs composed by Neil Sedaka, with lyrics by Sedaka, Howard Greenfield, and Philip Cody. The title of the musical is taken from Sedaka's signature song "Breaking Up Is Hard To Do."

== Premise ==
At Esther's Paradise, a small resort in the Catskills, in 1960, Lois urges her best friend Marge to look for a new partner after her fiancé leaves her. Gabe, one the resort's employees, falls in love with Marge, although she doesn't notice.

== Productions ==
Breaking Up Is Hard to Do premiered in 2005, produced at Capital Repertory Theatre in Albany, NY, directed by Gordon Greenberg.

The Southeastern United States regional premiere opened at Actor's Playhouse at the Miracle Theater on January 11, 2006, and ran through February 12, 2006. Gordon Greenberg directed a cast that included Stuart Zagnit (Harvey Feldmann), Edward Staudenmayer (Del Delmonaco), Nora May Lyng (Esther Simowitz), Jaime LaVerdiere (Gabriel Green), Jenny Fellner (Marge Gelman), and Laura Woyasz (Lois Warner). Choreography by Lisa Schriver, and the Design Team included Scenic Designer Jesse Poleshak, Costume Designer Thom Heyer, and Lighting design by Jeffery Croiter.

The show debuted on the West Coast in Thousand Oaks, California in January 2009.

The UK Premiere of ‘Breaking Up Is Hard To Do’ ran at The Guildhall Theatre in Derby in September 2016. Produced by JKB Productions the show received very favourable reviews locally and inspired more UK based productions in its wake. The cast featured Richard Hague as Del Delmonaco, Rachael Wyatt as Lois Warner, Sarah Towle as Marge Gelman, Tom Banks as Gabe, Richard Symes as Harvey and Kerry Britnell as Esther. A tour of this production was considered on the back of an excellent critical reception but ultimately did not come to fruition.

The musical received its London premiere at Upstairs at the Gatehouse, Highgate, from March 29, 2017, until 23 April. It was produced by Joseph Hodges Entertainments and directed by Jordan Murphy, with musical direction by Oliver Hance, choreography by Alyssa Noble, design by Richard Cooper, sound by Phil Wilson and casting by Harry Blumenau for Debbie O' Brien Casting. The cast included Robyn Mellor as Lois, Lauren Cocoracchio as Marge, Damien Walsh as Del, Jonny Muir as Gabe, Katie Paine as Esther, Andrew Bradley as Harvey, Abigail Carter Simpson and Samuel Bailey.

== Characters ==
- Marge Gelman
- Lois Warner
- Del Delmonaco
- Gabe Green
- Esther
- Harvey

== Musical numbers ==
Act I

- "Breaking Up Is Hard To Do" - Del with Lois and Harvey
- "Lonely Nights" - Marge
- "Where the Boys Are" - Lois and Marge
- "Happy Birthday Sweet Sixteen" - Del and Harvey
- "The Diary" - Gabe
- "Stupid Cupid" - Lois and Del
- "Betty Grable" - Marge and Del
- "King Of Clowns" - Harvey
- "Oh! Carol" - Del
- Act I Finale ("The Other Side of Me","I Ain't Hurtin' No More", "Where the Boys Are") - Gabe, Marge, and Lois

Act II

- "Calendar Girl" - Del, Marge, Lois, Esther, and Harvey
- "Next Door To An Angel" - Harvey and Esther
- "Breaking Up Is Hard To Do" (Reprise) - Harvey
- "Solitaire" - Marge
- "Laughter In The Rain" - Gabe
- "My Friend" - Lois and Marge
- "King Of Clowns" (Reprise) - Harvey and Esther
- "Stairway To Heaven/Little Devil" - Marge and Lois
- "Love Will Keep Us Together" - All

== Reception ==
The show was mostly well-received across its different iterations, especially in regards to its music, although reviewers tended to agree that the show had a thin plot and, although enjoyable, was forgettable.
