= Oh Carol: The Complete Recordings, 1955–66 =

Box set by Neil Sedaka
- Released: 2003
- Recorded: 1955–1966
- Genre: Pop
- Label: Bear Family

Oh! Carol: The Complete Recordings, 1955–66 is an eight CD box set of songs by Neil Sedaka. It was released in 2003 on Bear Family Records. The compilation is an almost exhaustive set of Sedaka's songs for the 1955 to 1966 period, encompassing 112 tunes. Most notably it includes his hits in English, as well as translations of his songs in German, Spanish, Italian, Japanese and Hebrew.

== Track listing ==
CD 1

1. While I Dream (Neil Sedaka/Howard Greenfield)
2. I Love My Baby (Neil Sedaka/Howard Greenfield)
3. Don't Go (Neil Sedaka/Howard Greenfield)
4. Come Back Joe (Neil Sedaka/Howard Greenfield)
5. Snowtime (Neil Sedaka/Howard Greenfield)
6. Laura Lee (Neil Sedaka/Howard Greenfield)
7. Ring A Rockin' (Neil Sedaka/Howard Greenfield)
8. Fly Don't Fly On Me (Neil Sedaka/Joel McKible)
9. Oh Delilah (Neil Sedaka/Howard Greenfield)
10. Neil's Twist (Neil Sedaka/Howard Greenfield) (instrumental)
11. The Diary (Neil Sedaka/Howard Greenfield)
12. No Vacancy (Neil Sedaka/Howard Greenfield)
13. All I Need Is You (Neil Sedaka/Howard Greenfield)
14. The Diary (Neil Sedaka/Howard Greenfield)
15. You're Knockin' Me Out (Neil Sedaka/Howard Greenfield)
16. As Long As I Live (Neil Sedaka/Howard Greenfield)
17. I Go Ape (Neil Sedaka/Howard Greenfield)
18. Moon Of Gold (Neil Sedaka/Howard Greenfield)
19. I Ain't Hurtin' No More (Neil Sedaka/Howard Greenfield)
20. I Belong To You (Neil Sedaka/Howard Greenfield)
21. You Gotta Learn Your Rhythm And Blues (Neil Sedaka/Howard Greenfield)
22. Crying My Heart Out For You (Neil Sedaka/Howard Greenfield)
23. Another Sleepless Night (Neil Sedaka/Howard Greenfield)
24. Fallin' (Neil Sedaka/Howard Greenfield)
25. Stupid Cupid (Neil Sedaka/Howard Greenfield)
26. I Waited Too Long (Neil Sedaka/Howard Greenfield)
27. Without Your Love (Neil Sedaka/Howard Greenfield)
28. Going Home To Mary Lou (Neil Sedaka/Howard Greenfield)

CD 2

1. Oh! Carol (Neil Sedaka/Howard Greenfield)
2. Oh Neil (Neil Sedaka/Howard Greenfield/Gerry Goffin) (song by Carole King)
3. One Way Ticket To The Blues (Hank Hunter/Jack Keller)
4. The Girl For Me (Anne Thompson (Sylvester Bradford))
5. What Am I Gonna Do (Neil Sedaka/Howard Greenfield)
6. Run Samson Run (Neil Sedaka/Howard Greenfield)
7. Stairway to Heaven (Neil Sedaka/Howard Greenfield)
8. You Mean Everything to Me (Neil Sedaka/Howard Greenfield)
9. I Must Be Dreaming (Neil Sedaka/Howard Greenfield)
10. Walk With Me (Neil Sedaka/Howard Greenfield)
11. Forty Winks Away (Barry Mann/Larry Colber)
12. Forty Winks Away (Barry Mann/Larry Colber)
13. Look To The Rainbow (Burton Lane/E.Y. Harburg)
14. Bess You Is My Woman Now (Ira Gershwin/George Gershwin/DuBose Heyward)
15. Circulate (Neil Sedaka/Howard Greenfield)
16. We Kiss In A Shadow (Richard Rodgers/Oscar Hammerstein II)
17. Everything Happens To Me (Tom Adair/Matt Dennis)
18. Smile (Charlie Chaplin/Geoff Parsons/John Turner)
19. I Found My World In You (Neil Sedaka/Howard Greenfield)
20. Angel Eyes (Earl K. Brent/Matt Dennis)
21. All The Way (Sammy Cahn/Jimmy Van Heusen)
22. Nothing Ever Changes My Love For You (Marvin Fisher/Jack Segal)
23. A Felicidade (Vinicius de Moraes/Antonio Carlos Jobim)
24. You Took Advantage Of Me (Lorenz Hart/Richard Rodgers)
25. Calendar Girl (Neil Sedaka/Howard Greenfield)
26. The Same Old Fool (Neil Sedaka/Howard Greenfield)

CD 3

1. Little Devil (Neil Sedaka/Howard Greenfield)
2. Another Day, Another Heartache (Neil Sedaka/Howard Greenfield)
3. This Endless Night (Eddie Grossman/Howard Greenfield)
4. Your Heart Has Changed Its Mind (Neil Sedaka/Howard Greenfield)
5. Sweet Little You (Barry Mann/Larry Kolber)
6. Don't Lead Me On (Neil Sedaka/Howard Greenfield)
7. Happy Birthday Sweet Sixteen (Neil Sedaka/Howard Greenfield)
8. King of Clowns (Neil Sedaka/Howard Greenfield)
9. Breaking Up Is Hard to Do (Neil Sedaka/Howard Greenfield)
10. All The Worlds In The World (Neil Sedaka/Howard Greenfield)
11. Next Door To An Angel (Neil Sedaka/Howard Greenfield)
12. Bad Girl (Neil Sedaka/Howard Greenfield)
13. Look Inside Your Heart (Francesco Migliacci jr/Luis Enriquez Grossman)
14. Waiting For Never (Francesco Migliacci jr/Luis Enriquez Grossman)
15. Let's Go Steady Again (Neil Sedaka/Howard Greenfield)
16. Alice In Wonderland (Neil Sedaka/Howard Greenfield)
17. The Dreamer (Neil Sedaka/Ronnie Grossman)
18. Too Late (Neil Sedaka/Ronnie Grossman)
19. Bad Girl (Neil Sedaka/Howard Greenfield)
20. Wait 'Til You See My Baby (Neil Sedaka/Howard Greenfield)
21. The Closest Thing To Heaven (Neil Sedaka/Howard Greenfield)
22. Fly Me To The Moon (In Other Words) (Bart Howard)
23. You'll Never Know (Mack Gordon/Harry Warren)
24. Without Your Love (Neil Sedaka/Howard Greenfield)
25. Because Of You (Arthur Hammerstein/Dudley Wilkinson)
26. Without A Song (Edward Eliscu/Billy Rose/Vincent Youmans)
27. I'll Be Seeing You (Irving Kahal/Sammy Fain)

CD 4

1. Sunny (Neil Sedaka/Howard Greenfield)
2. It Hurts to Be in Love (Neil Sedaka/Howard Greenfield)
3. She'll Never Be You (Neil Sedaka/Howard Greenfield)
4. Let The People Talk (Howard Greenfield/Helen Miller/Neil Sedaka)
5. I Hope He Breaks Your Heart (Howard Greenfield/Helen Miller/Neil Sedaka)
6. In The Chapel With You (Richard Grossman/Francesco Migliacci)
7. Another Day, Another Heartache (Neil Sedaka/Howard Greenfield)
8. The World Through A Tear (Christopher Allen/Peter Allen/Richard Everitt)
9. High On A Mountain (Deep In A Valley) (Richard Grossman/Hank Hunter)
10. Pictures From The Past (Neil Sedaka/Howard Greenfield)
11. The Answer To My Prayer (Peter Allen/Christopher Allen/Richard Everitt)
12. Blue Boy (Richard Grossman/Hank Hunter)
13. Nobody But You (Charles Fox/O. C. Francis)
14. We Hide From The Sun (Neil Sedaka/Howard Greenfield)
15. Sleeping Beauty (Neil Sedaka/Howard Greenfield)
16. The Answer Lies Within (Roger Atkins/Neil Sedaka)
17. Grown-Up Games (Roger Atkins/Neil Sedaka)
18. We Can Make It If We Try (Carole Bayer Sager/Neil Sedaka)
19. Cellophane Disguise (Carole Bayer Sager/Neil Sedaka)
20. Cold Girl (Roger Atkins/Neil Sedaka)
21. Pray For Love (Carole Bayer Sager/Neil Sedaka)
22. Hallelujah I Love Her So (Ray Charles)
23. Israeli Medley (Shalom Aleichem/Artza Aleinu/Tzena, Tzena, Tzena) (Paul (Buggie)/J. Barasch/Captain Michrousky/Richard Grossman/Hagizz/traditionell)
24. My Yiddishe Momme (Lew Pollack/Jack Yellen)
25. Scapricciatiello (Ferninando Albano/Pacifico Vento)

CD 5

1. Es deficil decir adiós (Neil Sedaka/Howard Greenfield)
2. No me mientas más (Howard Greenfield/Ben Molar/Neil Sedaka)
3. Pasaje de ida (Hank Hunter/Jerry Keller)
4. Chica de calendario (Howard Greenfield/Helen Miller/Carlo Rossi/Neil Sedaka)
5. Serás todo para mi (Neil Sedaka/Howard Greenfield)
6. Recuerdos de ipacaraí (Zulema De Mirkin/Demetrio Ortiz)
7. Rey de los payasos (Neil Sedaka/Howard Greenfield)
8. Feliz cumpleaños, dulces dietciséis (Howard Greenfield/Ben Molar/Neil Sedaka)
9. Diablito (Neil Sedaka/Howard Greenfield)
10. Con un beso (Howard Greenfield/Ben Molar/Neil Sedaka)
11. Soy el amor (Ben Molar/Tovaroga)
12. Mi madre querida (Ben Molar/Lew Pollack/Rafaelmo/Jack Yellen)
13. Mi vecinita (Cerca de un ángel) (Howard Greenfield/J. Ortiz Pino/Neil Sedaka)
14. María Elena (Lorenzo Barcelata)
15. Alicia (En el país de las maravillas) (Neil Sedaka/Howard Greenfield)
16. Mi dicha lejana (E. Ayala Báez)
17. Bésame otro vez (Volvamos a ser novios) (Howard Greenfield/J. Ortiz Pino/Neil Sedaka)
18. Más (Te guardaré en el corazón) (Marcello Ciorciolini/Oliveiro/Riz Ortolani/J. Ortiz Pino)
19. Chica mala (Howard Greenfield/Adolfo Salas/Neil Sedaka)
20. Divina ilusión (Frederik Chopin/E. Quezada)
21. Iré por tí (La terza luna) (Luis Bacalov/Richard Grossman/Francesco Migliacci/M. Molina Montes)
22. Creo estar soñando (Neil Sedaka/Howard Greenfield)
23. El reloj (Roberto Cantoral)
24. El soñandor (Ronnie Grossman/J. Ortiz Pino)
25. Cumbia de la primavera (Chico Novarro)
26. Qué suerte (Chicó Novarro/Palito Ortega)
27. Manuela (Armando Trovajoli)
28. Lunita consejera (Armando Trovajoli)
29. Ilero por ti porque no estas, ilero port (Peter Allen/Christopher Allen/Richard Everitt)
30. Entre montañ, nas cruzando valles (Richard Grossman/Hank Hunter)

CD 6

1. Esagerata (Matteo Leo Chiosso/Neil Sedaka)
2. Un giorno inutile (De Simoni/E. Gentile/Neil Sedaka)
3. Finché vivrò (Umberto Bertini/Howard Greenfield/Neil Sedaka)
4. L'ultimo appuntamento (Howard Greenfield/Francesco Migliacci/Neil Sedaka)
5. A 16 anni tu vuoi amare (Sergio Bardotti/Ronnie Grassman)
6. Tu non lo sai (Neil Sedaka/Howard Greenfield)
7. I tuoi capricci (Luis Enriquez Baracalov/Francesco Migliacci)
8. La terza luna (Luis Enriquez Baracalov/Francesco Migliacci)
9. Il cielo ti ha creata per me (Luca Palleschi/Carlo Rossi)
10. Quando sorridi così (Luis Enriquez Barcalov/Ido Ofir)
11. Il re dei pagliacci (D. Amenni/Howard Greenfield/Neil Sedaka)
12. Adesso no (Gianni Meccia/Enrico Polito)
13. Non cercare un'altra bocca (E. Gentile/Howard Greenfield/Neil Sedaka)
14. Se c'è un paradiso (Luis Bacalov/Francesco Migliacci)
15. Darei 10 anni (Robifer/Carlo Rossi)
16. La notte è fatta per amare (Howard Greenfield/Francesco Migliacci/Neil Sedaka)
17. La luna a fiori (Carlo Pes/Alberto Testa)
18. Non basta mai (Luis Enriquez Bacalov/Sergio Bardotti)
19. Ricordati ancora (Luis Enriquez Bacalov/Sergio Bardotti)
20. Sarà sarà (Luis Enriquez Bacalov/Ido Ofir)
21. Matto (Ronnie Grossman/Carlo Rossi)
22. Mai sarà come te (Howard Greenfield/Gino Ingrosso/Neil Sedaka)
23. Che non farei (Howard Greenfield/Helen Miller/Carlo Rossi/Neil Sedaka)
24. Viene la notte (Gianni Meccia/Francesco Migliacci)
25. I primi giorni (Gianni Meccia/Francesco Migliacci)
26. E la vita continua (Maria Rosa Conz/Giuseppe Previde Massara)
27. La forza del destino (Robifer/Carlo Rossi)

CD 7

1. Cantando con le lacrime agli occhi (Vittoria Mascheroni/Mario Panzeri)
2. I' te vurria vasà (Eddie DiCapua/Vincenzo Russo)
3. Tu, musica divina (Alfredo Brachi/Giovanni D'Anzi)
4. Sì, amore (Sammy Cahn/Jimmy Van Heusen)
5. 'Na sera 'e maggio (Cioffi/Pisano)
6. Ricordando (Fumo negli occhi) (Otto Harbach/Jerome Kern/Edgar Nomen)
7. Arcobaleno (Harold Arlen/Devilli/E.Y. "Yip" Harburg)
8. Estrelita (Manuel Ponce)
9. L'ultima foglia (Luis Bacalov/Francesco Migliacci/Bruno Zambrini)
10. Sorridi (Charlie Chaplin/Geoff Parsons/John Turner)
11. Questa notte saprò (Cochran/Devilli/Newman/Nisa)
12. Lettera bruciata (Sandy Linzer/Francesco Migliacci/Denny Randell)
13. Un'ora sola ti vorrei (Umberto Bertini)
14. L'amore e' una cosa meravigliosa (Sammy Fain/Paul Webster)
15. Crazy Daisy (Howard Greenfield/Kurt Hertha/Neil Sedaka)
16. Heaute sind es Träume (Howard Greenfield/Kurt Hertha/Neil Sedaka) (song in German)
17. Candy (Mädchen aus Old Germany) (Heinz Alisch/Werner O. Richter) (song in German)
18. Wenn ich in dein Fenster seh' (Hans Bradtke/Neil Sedaka) (song in German)
19. Nur ein Bild von dir (Neil Sedaka/Günther Loose) (song in German)
20. So wie mein Baby (Heinz Alisch/Werner O. Richter) (song in German)
21. Die Welt ohne dich (Peter Allen/Christopher Allen/Richard Everitt) (song in German)
22. Oh Carol (Neil Sedaka/Howard Greenfield/Chaim Kaynan) (song in Hebrew)
23. You Mean Everything To Me (Neil Sedaka/Howard Greenfield/Chaim Kaynan) (song in Hebrew)
24. Namida No Komichi (Peter Allen/Christopher Allen/Richard Everitt) (song in Japanese)
25. High On A Mountain (Richard Grossman/Hank Hunter) (song in Japanese)

CD 8

1. Without Your Love (Neil Sedaka/Howard Greenfield) (instrumental)
2. Walk With Me (Gerry Goffin/Howard Greenfield/Neil Sedaka) (instrumental)
3. The Diary (Neil Sedaka/Howard Greenfield) (instrumental)
4. You Mean Everything To Me (Neil Sedaka/Howard Greenfield) (instrumental)
5. Time Marches On (Neil Sedaka/Howard Greenfield) (instrumental)
6. Where The Boys Are (Neil Sedaka/Howard Greenfield) (instrumental)
7. What Am I Gonna Do (Neil Sedaka/Howard Greenfield) (instrumental)
8. One Way Ticket (To The Blues) (Hank Hunter/Jack Keller) (instrumental)
9. Happy Birthday Sweet Sixteen (Neil Sedaka/Howard Greenfield) (instrumental)
10. Calendar Girl (Neil Sedaka/Howard Greenfield) (instrumental)
11. Little Devil (Neil Sedaka/Howard Greenfield) (instrumental)
12. Oh Carol (Neil Sedaka/Howard Greenfield) (instrumental)
13. I Go Ape (Neil Sedaka/Howard Greenfield) (stereo)
14. No Vacancy (Neil Sedaka/Howard Greenfield) (stereo)
15. Oh Carol (Neil Sedaka/Howard Greenfield) (stereo)
16. Sunny (Neil Sedaka/Howard Greenfield) (stereo)
17. She'll Never Be You (Neil Sedaka/Howard Greenfield) (stereo)
18. Sleeping Beauty (Neil Sedaka/Howard Greenfield) (stereo)
19. Forty Winks Away (Larry Kolber/Barry Mann) (first vocal version)
20. Without A Song (Edward Eliscu/Billy Rose/Vincent Youmans) (stereo)
21. My Best Friend Barbara
22. TV Show
23. The Canvas Sky (from the film Ring Around the World)
24. The Waterbug (from the film Playgirl Killer)
25. The Jellyfish Song (from the film Sting of Death)
26. Party Song (from the film Sting of Death)
27. Instant Love (from the film Instant Love)
28. It Happened Again (from the film Instant Love)
29. Station Breaks (a radio advertisement)
30. Message To Japanese Fans (talk)
31. The Christmas Greeting (talk)
32. New Years Greeting (talk)
