= Neil Sedaka Sings Little Devil and His Other Hits =

Studio album by Neil Sedaka
- Released: 1961
- Genre: Pop
- Label: RCA Victor
- Producer: Al Nevins; Don Kirshner

Neil Sedaka chronology
Circulate (1961)	Neil Sedaka Sings Little Devil and His Other Hits (1961)	Neil Sedaka Sings His Greatest Hits (1963)

Neil Sedaka Sings Little Devil and His Other Hits is a solo album by Neil Sedaka released in 1961 immediately after the cover versions of earlier hits in Circulate.

== Track listing ==
All tracks composed by Neil Sedaka and Howard Greenfield; except where indicated

1. "Little Devil"
2. "Oh! Carol"
3. "You Mean Everything to Me"
4. "Run Samson Run"
5. "The Girl For Me" (Sylvester Bradford, Annebelle Thompson)
6. "Stairway to Heaven"
7. "Calendar Girl"
8. "I Must Be Dreaming"
9. "Going Home to Mary Lou"
10. "The Diary"
11. "What Am I Gonna Do"
12. "One Way Ticket" (Hank Hunter, Jack Keller)

== Singles ==
All of the songs on this album were released on 45 rpm singles. Seven of the twelve songs on this album hit the US and UK charts as follows:

- "Little Devil" (US #11, UK #9)
- "Oh! Carol" (US #9, UK #3)
- "You Mean Everything to Me" (US #17, UK #45)
- "Run Samson Run" (US #28)
- "Stairway to Heaven" (US #9, UK #8)
- "Calendar Girl" (#4, UK #8)
- "The Diary" (US #14) (already found on the Rock with Sedaka album)

"You Mean Everything to Me" and "Run Samson Run" were released together on a 45 rpm record; with both songs charting, the record gave Sedaka a rare double A-side.

The other five songs had also seen 45 rpm single releases as follows:

- "The Girl For Me" was a non-charting A-side from 1959.
- "I Must Be Dreaming" was the B-side of "Little Devil" in 1961.
- "Going Home To Mary Lou" was a single from 1959. The song reached number 3 on the Utamatic singles chart in Japan.
- "What Am I Gonna Do" was the B-side of "Going Home To Mary Lou" in 1959.
- "One Way Ticket (to the Blues)" was the B-side of "Oh, Carol!" in 1959.

== Re-releases ==
=== 1993 ===
The album was re-released in 1993 with the same 12 original tracks in addition to 8 bonus tracks:

- 13) "Stupid Cupid" (Neil Sedaka, Howard Greenfield)
- 14) "You Got to Learn Your Rhythm and Blues" (Neil Sedaka, Howard Greenfield)
- 15) "Sweet Little You" (Mann, Kolber) (US #59)
- 16) "King of Clowns" (Neil Sedaka, Howard Greenfield) (US #45 UK #23)
- 17) "Breaking Up Is Hard to Do" (Neil Sedaka, Howard Greenfield) (US #1, UK #7)
- 18) "Next Door To An Angel" (Neil Sedaka, Howard Greenfield) (US #5, UK #29)
- 19) "The Dreamer" (Grossman) (#47)
- 20) "Let's Go Steady Again" (Neil Sedaka, Howard Greenfield) (US #26, UK #42)

=== 2010 ===
The 12 tracks from the original 1961 release were reissued again in late 2010, combined with the tracks from the 1978 album The Many Sides Of Neil Sedaka.

=== 2017 ===
In April 2017, the UK-based Hallmark Records reissued this album on CD according to the original 1961 track listing.
