= Oh! Carol and Other Big Hits =

Oh Carol and Other Big Hits
- cover of the 1989 CD reissue

Compilation album
- Released: 1975
- Label: RCA

Oh! Carol and Other Big Hits is a 1975 compilation album containing the works of American pop singer Neil Sedaka. The album contains his recordings from the period 1959–1964, when he was affiliated with RCA Records. It is a blend of his rock hits with a few pop standards he recorded for the Circulate album in 1961. It was originally released on LP by RCA in 1975, and was reissued as a CD in 1989.

== Track listing ==
1. "Oh! Carol" (1959)
2. "Little Devil" (1961)
3. "Circulate" (1961)
4. "All the Way" (1961)
5. "Breaking Up is Hard to Do" (1962)
6. "Calendar Girl" (1961)
7. "Smile" (1961)
8. "Everything Happens to Me" (1961)
9. "Sunny" (1964)
10. "One-Way Ticket To The Blues" (1959)
