= Precious Wilson =

Jamaican-born soul singer (born 1957)

Background information
- Born: 18 October 1957 (age 68)
- Origin: Spanish Town, Jamaica
- Genres: Dance-pop, dance, soul
- Occupations: Singer-songwriter, performer
- Instrument: Vocals
- Years active: 1974–present
- Labels: Hansa Records, Jive Records Sony Music Entertainment
- Website: www.preciouswilson.com

Precious Wilson (born 18 October 1957) is a Jamaican soul singer.

== Background ==
Precious Wilson was born in Spanish Town, Jamaica. She started out as a backing singer for the singing group Eruption. The group enjoyed their first minor success when they won a talent competition in 1975, and then went on to record the song "Let Me Take You Back in Time". Shortly after, the lead singer left the group, and Precious Wilson stepped forward to front the band.

The group relocated to Germany in 1976. The following year, while on the road touring in West Germany, Eruption was introduced to German producer Frank Farian, who booked them to work with Boney M as their backing band, and as their support act on Boney M's first European tour. Farian then went on to sign them to Boney M.'s label, Hansa Records, and Farian released the single "Party Party". However, it was their disco cover version of Ann Peebles' "I Can't Stand the Rain" from their first album that broke big, giving them a UK No. 5 hit and a US No. 18 hit. After a second album and another hit single with Neil Sedaka's "One Way Ticket" (UK #9), Precious Wilson left the group to pursue her solo career.

== Solo career ==
Wilson's debut single as a solo artist was a cover version of Sam & Dave's "Hold On I'm Coming", released in August 1979. Produced by Frank Farian and set to a funky disco-beat, the single reached No. 45 in the Dutch charts. The song was also included in Boney M's fourth album Oceans of Fantasy which also yielded a guest performance by Wilson on the opening track "Let It All Be Music".

She co-wrote several tracks, including the title song of her debut album We Are on the Race Track, also produced by Farian, was completed during 1980 on Hansa Records. It was released in October, heralded by the single "Cry to Me", which Wilson performed on TV, backed by the band that she created called Sky Train. The single reached number 3 in Switzerland. The album's second single, "We Are on the Race Track", reached No. 11 in Switzerland in early 1981.

In October 1981, Wilson released a cover version of "I Need You", which peaked at No. 6 in Switzerland. In Germany, it reached No. 39. In the summer of 1982, the electro-pop track "I Don't Know" was released, followed by her second album All Coloured in Love. The album was released with a different track selection in the UK, Italy and France under the name Red Light, followed by several different single releases in the various territories.

Hot on the heels of the then Aerobic craze and Farian's success with the album Aerobic Fitness Dancing, the theme song "Let's Move Aerobic (Move Your Body)" was rush-released with Wilson's vocals in March 1983. Her third album Funky Fingers, consisting of two side-long medleys of soul standards, was released in December 1983. In 1985, she signed with Jive Records and teamed up with multiple producer teams for the album, including American songwriter, Monte Moir, a musician and songwriter, best known as a member of The Time.

The following year, Wilson released several singles; "I'll Be Your Friend" (a U.S. Top 40 R&B hit), the theme song from the Michael Douglas movie The Jewel of the Nile (the sequel to the movie Romancing the Stone), and "Nice Girls Don't Last" ("Love Can't Wait" in the U.S.).

In 1986, she contributed to the charity album titled The Anti-Heroin Project: It's a Live-in World, singing among others on the title track, as well as on "Waiting in the Dark" and a song called "Something Better" with Kim Wilde and Darryl Pandy.

A dance cover of Jerry Butler's "Only the Strong Survive" in 1987, produced by Stock Aitken Waterman.

Wilson was one of the three background singers on the Elton John song "Duets for One" (1993).

She has toured the former USSR on the invitation of the Soviet Cultural Ministry. The 55-date concert tour was arranged in six Soviet Republics, performing to full capacity audiences at each venue. She was the first black UK based female artiste to have undertaken such an extensive tour in the then USSR in 1988.

After another of her co-written songs, was the single "I May Be Right 4U" in 1990. She achieved two small hit singles in the early 1990s with a cover of Sheila and B. Devotion's "Spacer" (a hit single in France, 1992) and a cover of Donna Summer's "I Feel Love" (a UK No. 19 hit single with techno group Messiah, 1992). Since then, Wilson has been touring extensively internationally, and also frequently tours as Precious Wilson of Eruption.

In 2017, Precious Wilson appeared on the Channel 4 programme First Dates.

In 2018, Wilson was one of 12 co-authors of a book titled Mission Critical Messengers: How to Deliver a Difference.

Her most recent release is a version of the song "Something's Gotten Hold of My Heart", released in July 2022.

== Discography ==
=== Solo albums ===
- On the Race Track (October 1980)
- All Coloured in Love (July 1982) – released as Red Light in France and UK.
- Funky Fingers (December 1983)
- Precious Wilson (Jive Records, 1986)

=== Singles ===
Year	Title	Chart positions				
Year	Title	GER	SWI	NL	UK	US R&B
1979	"Hold On, I'm Coming"	—	—	45	—	—
1980	"Cry to Me"	—	3	12	—	—
1981	"We Are on the Race Track"	11	—	—	—	—
1981	"I Need You"	39	6	—	—	—
1982	"I Don't Know"	33	—	—	—	—
1982	"Raising My Family"	61	—	—	—	—
1982	"Red Light" (FR)	—	—	—	—	—
1983	"Let's Move Aerobic (Move Your Body)"	—	—	—	—	—
1984	"River Deep, Mountain High" / "Funky Fingers"	—	—	—	—	—
1985	"I'll Be Your Friend"	—	—	—	87	40
1986	"The Jewel of the Nile"	—	—	—	—	—
1986	"Nice Girls Don't Last"	—	—	—	—	—
1986	"Love Can't Wait" (US)	—	—	—	—	—
1987	"Only the Strong Survive"	—	—	—	—	—
1990	"I May Be Right 4U"	—	—	—	—	—
1992	"I Feel Love" (Messiah feat. Precious Wilson)	—	—	—	19	—
1992	"Spacer" (Funky French Guy & Precious Wilson)	—	—	—	—	—
"—" denotes releases that did not chart or were not released in that territory.

== See also ==
- List of disco artists (L-R)
- Eruption (band)
