= You Mean Everything to Me =

You Mean Everything to Me may refer to:

- "You Mean Everything to Me" (song), a song by Neil Sedaka
- "You Mean Everything to Me", a song by Curtis Mayfield
- "You Mean Everything to Me", a song by Black Ivory
- "You Mean Everything to Me", a song by Shawn Mullins
