= Brill Building =

Office building in Manhattan, New York

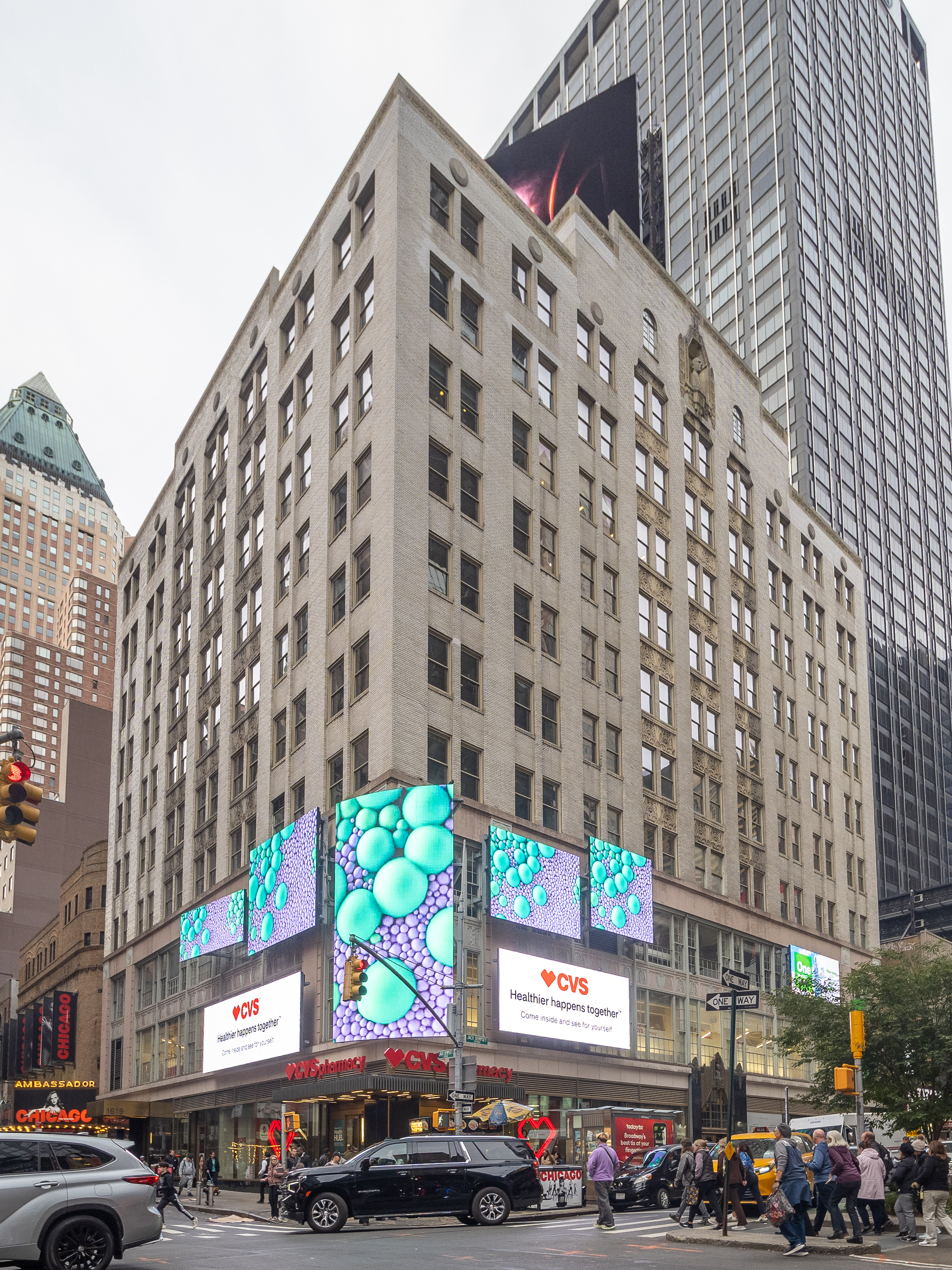
- Seen in 2024

General information
- Type: Office building
- Location: 1619 Broadway, Manhattan, New York
- Coordinates: 40°45′40″N 73°59′04″W
- Opening: 1931

Technical details
- Floor count: 11
- Floor area: 175,000 sq ft (16,300 m^{2})

Design and construction
- Developer: Victor Bark Jr.
- Main contractor: Abraham E. Lefcourt

New York City Landmark
- Designated: March 23, 2010
- Reference no.: 2387

The Brill Building is an office building at 1619 Broadway on 49th Street in the New York City borough of Manhattan, just north of Times Square and farther uptown from the historic musical Tin Pan Alley neighborhood. The Brill Building housed music industry offices and studios where some of the most popular American songs were written. It is considered to have been the center of the American music industry that dominated the pop charts in the early 1960s.

It was built in 1931 as the Alan E. Lefcourt Building, after the son of its builder Abraham E. Lefcourt, and designed by Victor Bark Jr. The building is 11 stories high and has about 175,000 square feet (16,300 m^{2}) of rentable area.

The "Brill" name comes from Maurice Brill, a haberdasher who operated a store at street level and subsequently bought the building. The Brill Building was purchased by 1619 Broadway Realty LLC in June 2013 and subsequently renovated. A CVS Pharmacy opened on the building's first two floors in 2019.

== Big band era ==
Before World War II, the Brill Building became a center of activity for the popular music industry, especially music publishing and songwriting. Scores of music publishers had offices in the Brill Building. Once songs had been published, the publishers sent song pluggers to the popular bands and radio stations. These song pluggers would sing and/or play the song for the band leaders to encourage bands to play their music.

During the ASCAP strike of 1941, many of the composers, authors and publishers turned to pseudonyms in order to have their songs played on the air.

Brill Building songs were frequently at the top of Billboard's Hit Parade and played by the leading bands of the day:

- The Benny Goodman Orchestra
- The Glenn Miller Orchestra
- The Jimmy Dorsey Orchestra
- The Tommy Dorsey Orchestra

Publishers included:

- Leo Feist Inc.
- Lewis Music Publishing
- Mills Music Publishing

Brill Building composers and lyricists during the big band era included:

- Buddy Feyne
- Johnny Mercer
- Irving Mills
- Ben Raleigh
- Billy Rose

== "Brill Building Sound" ==
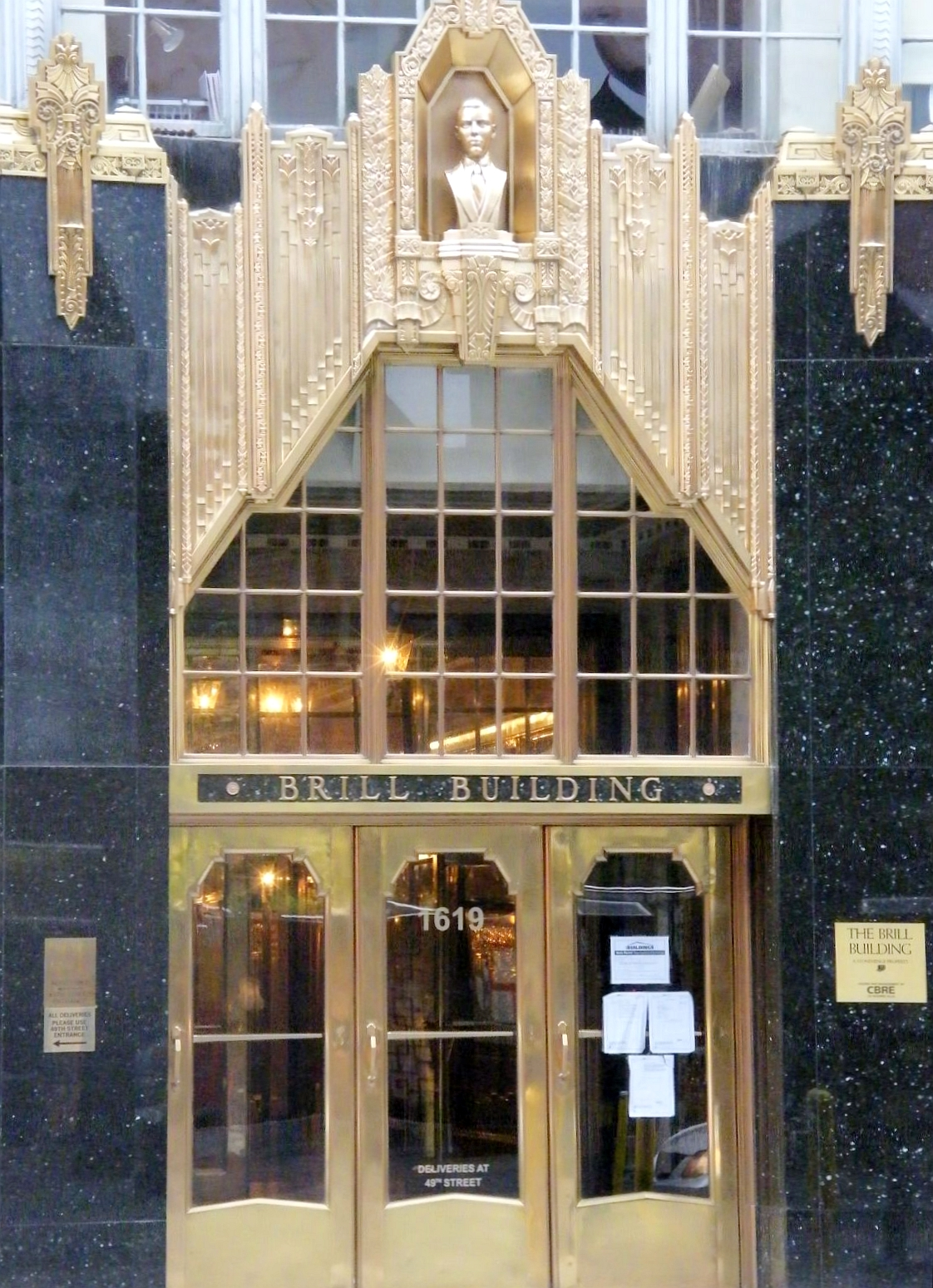
Entryway (2008)

The Brill Building's name has been widely adopted as a shorthand term for a broad and influential stream of American popular music (strongly influenced by Latin music, traditional black gospel, and rhythm and blues) which enjoyed great commercial success in the late 1950s and throughout the 1960s. Many significant American and international publishing companies, music agencies, and record labels were based in New York, and although these ventures were naturally spread across many locations, the Brill Building was regarded as probably the most prestigious address in New York for music business professionals. The term "Brill Building Sound" is somewhat inaccurate, however, since much of the music so categorized actually emanated from other locations — music historian Ken Emerson nominated buildings at 1650 Broadway and 1697 Broadway as other significant bases of activity in this field.

By 1962, the Brill Building contained 165 music businesses. In the mid-1960s a musician could cut a demo, find a publisher and printer, promote the record and cut a deal with radio promoters without leaving the building. The creative culture of the independent music companies in the Brill Building and the nearby 1650 Broadway came to define the influential "Brill Building Sound" and the style of popular songwriting and recording created by its writers and producers.

Carole King described the atmosphere at the "Brill Building" publishing houses of the period:

Every day we squeezed into our respective cubby holes with just enough room for a piano, a bench, and maybe a chair for the lyricist if you were lucky. You'd sit there and write and you could hear someone in the next cubby hole composing a song exactly like yours. The pressure in the Brill Building was really terrific—because Donny (Kirshner) would play one songwriter against another. He'd say: "We need a new smash hit"—and we'd all go back and write a song and the next day we'd each audition for Bobby Vee's producer.

— Quoted in The Sociology of Rock by Simon Frith

The Brill Building approach—which can be extended to other publishers not based in the Brill Building—was one way that professionals in the music business took control of things in the time after rock and roll's first wave. In the Brill Building practice, there were no more unpredictable or rebellious singers; in fact, a specific singer in most cases could be easily replaced with another. These songs were written to order by pros who could custom fit the music and lyrics to the targeted teen audience. In a number of important ways, the Brill Building approach was a return to the way business had been done in the years before rock and roll, since it returned power to the publishers and record labels and made the performing artists themselves much less central to the music's production.

=== Writers ===
Many of the works in this diverse category were written by a loosely affiliated group of songwriter-producer teams—mostly duos—that enjoyed immense success and who collectively wrote some of the biggest hits of the period. Many in this group were close friends and/or (in the cases of Goffin-King, Mann-Weil and Greenwich-Barry) married couples, as well as creative and business associates—and both individually and as duos, they often worked together and with other writers in a wide variety of combinations. Some (Carole King, Paul Simon, Burt Bacharach, Neil Sedaka, Neil Diamond, Boyce and Hart, Bob Gaudio by way of The Four Seasons) recorded and had hits with their own music.

- Burt Bacharach and Hal David
- Bert Berns
- Otis Blackwell
- Sonny Bono
- Boyce and Hart
- Bob Crewe
- Neil Diamond
- Sherman Edwards
- Haras Fyre and Gwen Guthrie
- Bob Gaudio
- Giant, Baum & Kaye
- Gerry Goffin and Carole King
- Ellie Greenwich and Jeff Barry
- Marvin Hamlisch
- Kander and Ebb
- Jack Keller
- Andy Kim
- Artie Kornfeld
- Jerry Leiber and Mike Stoller
- Sandy Linzer and Denny Randell
- Barry Mann and Cynthia Weil
- John Leslie McFarland
- Helen Miller
- Shadow Morton
- Claus Ogerman
- Tony Orlando
- Hugo Peretti and Luigi Creatore
- Doc Pomus and Mort Shuman
- Tony Powers
- Beverly Ross
- Neil Sedaka and Howard Greenfield
- Paul Simon as Jerry Landis
- Phil Spector
- Eddie Snyder
- Bobby Susser
- Steve Tyrell

Other musicians who were headquartered in the Brill Building include:

- Bobby Darin
- The Drifters featuring Ben E. King
- Connie Francis
- Lesley Gore
- Haras Fyre
- Darlene Love
- Liza Minnelli
- Donald Fagen and Walter Becker
- Gene Pitney
- The Ronettes
- The Shangri-Las
- The Shirelles
- The Sweet Inspirations
- Doris Troy
- Frankie Valli & The Four Seasons
- Dee Dee Warwick
- Dionne Warwick
- The Delicates

Among the hundreds of hits written by this group are "Maybe I Know" (Barry-Greenwich), "Yakety Yak" (Leiber-Stoller), "Save the Last Dance for Me" (Pomus-Shuman), "The Look of Love" (Bacharach-David), "Breaking Up Is Hard to Do" (Sedaka-Greenfield), "Devil in Disguise" (Giant-Baum-Kaye), "The Loco-Motion" (Goffin-King), "Supernatural Thing" (Haras Fyre-Gwen Guthrie), "We Gotta Get Out of This Place" (Mann-Weil), "River Deep, Mountain High" (Spector-Greenwich-Barry), "Big Girls Don't Cry" (Gaudio-Crewe), and "Working My Way Back to You" (Linzer-Randell).

=== Musicians ===
The following is a partial list of studio musicians who contributed to the Brill Building sound:

- Arrangers/Conductors: Teacho Wiltshire, Garry Sherman, Alan Lorber, Jimmy Wisner, Artie Butler, Claus Ogerman, Stan Applebaum
- Bass: George Duvivier, Milt Hinton, Russ Savakus, Bob Bushnell, Joe Macho Jr, Al Lucas, Dick Romoff, James Tyrell, Jimmy Lewis, Lloyd Trotman, Wendell Marshall, Chuck Rainey
- Guitar: George Barnes, Al Gorgoni, Carl Lynch, Trade Martin, Bucky Pizzarelli, Everett Barksdale, Bill Suyker, Vinnie Bell, Al Caiola, Al Casamenti, Art Ryerson, Eric Gale, Ralph Casale, Charles Macey, Hugh McCracken, Wally Richardson, Don Arnone, Charles McCracken, Allan Hanlon, Sal Ditroia, Kenny Burrell, Mundell Lowe, Cornell Dupree, Mickey Baker
- Keyboards: Ernie Hayes, Paul Griffin, Leroy Glover, Frank Owens, Allan H. Nurse, Bernie Leighton, Artie Butler, Stan Free, Ron Frangipane
- Drums: Gary Chester, Buddy Saltzman, Sticks Evans, Herbie Lovelle, Panama Francis, Al Rogers, Bobby Gregg, Sol Gubin, Bernard Purdie
- Saxophone: Artie Kaplan, Frank Heywood Henry, Phil Bodner, Jerome Richardson, Romeo Penque, King Curtis, Seldon Powell, Sam "the Man" Taylor, Buddy Lucas
- Trombone: Jimmy Cleveland, Frank Saracco, Benny Powell, Wayne Andre, Tony Studd, Micky Gravine, Urbie Green, Frank Rehak
- Trumpet: Jimmy Nottingham, Ernie Royal, Jimmy Maxwell, Bernie Glow, Irwin "Marky" Markowitz, Jimmy Sedlar, Dud Bascomb, Lammar Wright Jr, Burt Collins, Joe Shepley
- Percussion: George Devens, Phil Kraus, Bobby Rosengarden, Willie Rodriguez, Martin Grupp
- Engineers: Brooks Arthur, Eddie Smith, Bruce Staple, Phil Ramone, Gordy Clark, Mickey Crofford, Tom Dowd, Bill MacMeekin, Ron Johnson.

=== Aldon Music (1650 Broadway) ===
Many of these writers came to prominence while under contract to Aldon Music, a publishing company founded in 1958 by industry veteran Al Nevins, and aspiring music entrepreneur Don Kirshner. Aldon was not initially located in the Brill Building, but rather, a block away at 1650 Broadway (at 51st Street). A number of Brill Building writers worked at 1650 Broadway, and the building continued to house record labels throughout the decades.

Toni Wine explains:

There were really two huge buildings that were housing publishing companies, songwriters, record labels, and artists. The Brill Building was one. But truthfully, most of your R&B, really rock & roll labels and publishing companies, including the studio, which was in the basement and was called Allegro Studios, was in 1650 Broadway. They were probably a block and a half away from each other. 1650 and the Brill Building.

== Businesses at 1619 Broadway (Brill Building) and 1650 Broadway ==
=== 1619 Broadway ===
- Hill and Range Songs
- Elvis Presley Music
- Broadway Video
- Postworks LLC/Orbit Digital
- Famous Music
- Fiesta Records
- Coed Records, Inc.
- Mills Music
- Clock Records
- Southern Music
- Red Bird Records
- TM Music
- SoundOne (primarily film sound editing) and Sound Mixers (sound studio for jingles and music albums)
- Helios Music/Glamorous Music
- KMA Music
- New Vision Communications
- Paul Simon Music
- Key Brand Entertainment
- Maggie Vision Productions
- Alexa Management – President/CEO – Shafi Khan
- TSQ LLC
- Mission Big
- Studio Center

=== 1650 Broadway ===
- Aldon Music
- Action Talents agency
- April/Blackwood Music
- Bang Records
- Bell Records, Inc.
- Buddah Records, Inc.
- Capezio Dance Theatre Shop
- Diamond Records
- Fling Music
- Gamble Records, Inc.
- H/B Webman & Co.
- Iridium Jazz Club
- Laurie Records
- Princess Music Publishing, Corp.
- Roulette Records
- Scepter Records
- Wand Records
- Web IV Music, Inc.
- We Three Music Publishing, Inc.
- Just Sunshine Records
- Allegro Sound Studios (later called Generation Sound Studios)
- Roosevelt Music

== In popular culture ==
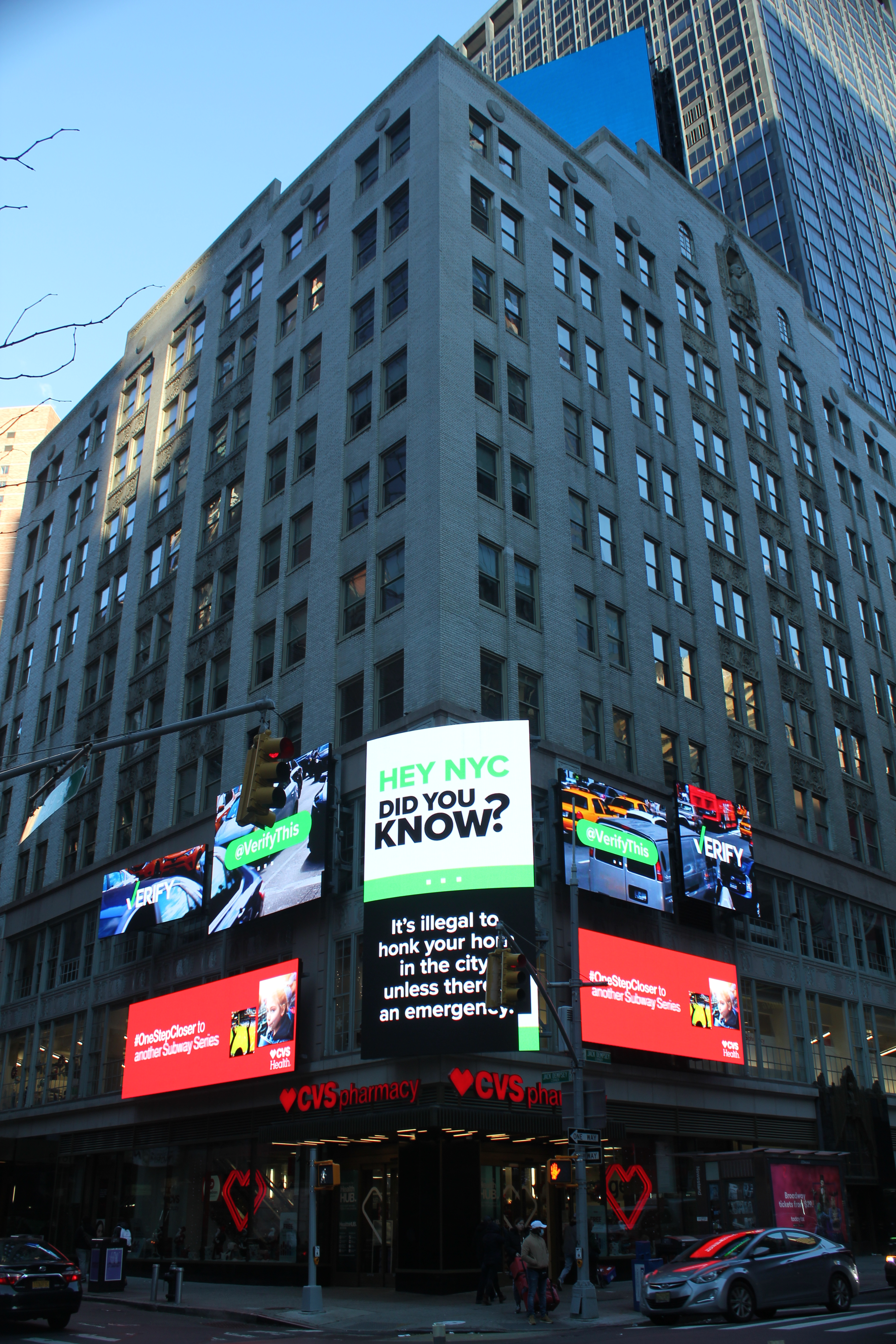
The southeast corner in 2021

The 1996 film Grace of My Heart is in part a fictionalized account of the life in the Brill Building. Illeana Douglas plays a songwriter loosely based on Carole King. Similarly, Broadway musical Beautiful depicts King's early career, including her songwriting at 1650 Broadway. Scenes from Jersey Boys depict the Brill Building and the Allegro Studios at 1650 Broadway.

In Sweet Smell of Success, J.J. Hunsecker and his sister Susie live on one of the upper floors of the Brill Building. The title of the 2014 New Pornographers power pop album Brill Bruisers is a reference to the 1960s-era Brill Building studio sound. In the HBO series Vinyl, the fictitious record label American Century is headquartered in the Brill Building.

Jack Dempsey's Broadway Restaurant was located in the Brill Building's first floor on Broadway.

It features in several episodes of the Broadway-themed NBC musical drama Smash.

Stephin Merritt makes reference to the Brill Building on the Magnetic Fields' "Epitaph For My Heart" from their 1999 release 69 Love Songs.

== Renovations and current use ==
The New York City Landmarks Preservation Commission (LPC) designated the Brill Building as a landmark in December 2010.

In 2017 Brookfield Properties foreclosed on the building's $50 million mezzanine loan. It subsequently bought the building for $220 million at a foreclosure auction in March 2017. Jimmy Buffett's hospitality company considered the building for a Margaritaville restaurant. It had investigated taking 25,000 square feet (2,300 m^{2}) across the ground floor, second floor, and 11-story roof. The owners also negotiated with CVS Pharmacy and WeWork to lease some of the space, In 2020, the LPC approved a proposal by Bruno Kearney Architects to add LED signs to the Brill Building's facade and modify a ground-floor storefront for TD Bank. In July 2023, Brookfield transferred the deed to the Brill Building to lender Mack Real Estate Group in a transfer valued at $216.1 million. At the time, part of the ground floor was occupied by CVS and TD Bank, while some of the storefronts were vacant.

== See also ==
- National Register of Historic Places listings in Manhattan from 14th to 59th Streets
- List of New York City Designated Landmarks in Manhattan from 14th to 59th Streets
