= One Way Ticket (Neil Sedaka song) =

1959 song by Neil Sedaka, popularized by Eruption in 1979

- Front cover of Japanese 7-inch single

Single by Neil Sedaka

from the album Neil Sedaka Sings Little Devil and His Other Hits
- Language: English
- A-side: "Oh! Carol"
- Released: 1959
- Studio: RCA Victor Studio A, New York City
- Genre: Pop
- Length: 2:13
- Label: RCA
- Songwriters: Jack Keller, Hank Hunter
- Producer: Al Nevins

"One Way Ticket" is a song written by Jack Keller and Hank Hunter. It was originally performed by American singer Neil Sedaka and popularized by British disco band Eruption.

== Neil Sedaka version ==
The track was originally performed by Neil Sedaka and included as the B-side on Sedaka's 1959 single "Oh! Carol". In 1961, the song featured in the track listing of his third studio album, Neil Sedaka Sings Little Devil and His Other Hits, but was never released as a standalone single. Despite this, the song made it to number one on the Japanese pop charts, where it was affectionately called "The Choo-Choo Train Song".

The lyrics allude to several popular songs of the late 1950s, including "Lonesome Town", "Heartbreak Hotel", "Bye Bye Love", "Gotta Travel On", "Lonely Teardrops", "A Fool Such as I", and "I Cried a Tear".

== Eruption version ==
"One Way Ticket"
- Front cover of UK 7-inch single

Single by Eruption

from the album Leave a Light
- B-side: "Left Me in the Rain"
- Released: January 1979
- Recorded: 1978
- Genre: Disco
- Length: 3:35
- Label: Hansa, Ariola, RCA
- Songwriters: Jack Keller, Hank Hunter
- Producers: Frank Farian, Rainer M. Ehrhardt

Eruption singles chronology
"Leave a Light" (1978)	"One Way Ticket" (1979)	"Go Johnnie Go" (1980)

"One Way Ticket" was covered by British disco band Eruption for their second album, Leave a Light. The song became a big hit in Europe in the first half of 1979, topping charts in Austria and Switzerland, and reaching top 10 across Europe. This song inspired the item song "Hari Om Hari" from the Hindi film Pyara Dushman (1980). "One Way Ticket" is now one of the band's trademark hits, along with their cover of "I Can't Stand the Rain".

=== Track listing ===
- 7" Single (1979)

A. "One Way Ticket" – 3:35
B. "Left Me in the Rain" – 3:54

- 12" Single (1979)

A. "One Way Ticket" (Long Version) – 5:05
B. "Left Me in the Rain" – 3:54

- CD Single (1994)
1. "One Way Ticket" (Radio Version) – 3:58
2. "One Way Ticket" (Club Mix) – 5:58
3. "One Way Ticket" (Never Return Mix) – 5:44
4. "If I Loved You Less" – 4:08

=== Chart performance ===
==== Weekly charts ====
Chart (1979)	Peak position
Argentina (CAPIF)	2
Australia (Kent Music Report)	10
Austria (Ö3 Austria Top 40)	1
Belgium (Ultratop 50 Flanders)	2
Denmark (Hitlisten)	2
Finland (Suomen virallinen lista)	2
French Singles Chart	4
Irish Singles Chart	13
Netherlands (Single Top 100)	5
Netherlands (Dutch Top 40)	4
New Zealand (Recorded Music NZ)	32
South Africa (Springbok Radio)	5
Sweden (Sverigetopplistan)	8
Switzerland (Schweizer Hitparade)	1
UK Singles (Official Charts Company)	9
US Dance Club Songs (Billboard)	30
West Germany (GfK)	7
Zimbabwe (ZIMA)	4

==== Year-end charts ====
Year-end chart performance for "One Way Ticket "
Chart (1979)	Position
Australia (Kent Music Report)	42
