= Venus in Blue Jeans =

1962 Jimmy Clanton single

Single by Jimmy Clanton
- B-side: "Highway Bound"
- Released: 1962
- Length: 2:24
- Label: Ace
- Songwriter(s): Howard Greenfield; Jack Keller
- Producer(s): Jack Keller

Jimmy Clanton singles chronology
"Just a Moment" (1962)	"Venus in Blue Jeans" (1962)	"Darkest Street in Town" (1962)

"Venus in Blue Jeans" is a 1962 song written by Howard Greenfield and Jack Keller. It was recorded that year by Jimmy Clanton and reached No. 7 on the Billboard charts, and No. 5 on the CHUM Chart in Canada.

The song was also recorded that year by Mark Wynter who released the song in the UK where it reached No. 4.

== Background ==
The song was written by Howard Greenfield and Jack Keller, although Neil Sedaka is often miscredited as one of the writers. Greenfield took inspiration in the lyrics from songs such as "Mona Lisa" by Nat King Cole and "Venus" by Frankie Avalon. A demo was then recorded with Barry Mann on lead vocals and The Cookies on backing vocals. The song was first recorded by Bruce Bruno in 1961 and released as the B-side to a single titled "Dear Joanne" on Roulette Records, but the single failed to chart.

In 1962, Jimmy Clanton went to New York after pausing his career to serve with the National Guard, and got in touch with Greenfield and Sedaka to record some songs. He found "Venus in Blue Jeans" in a pile of rejected demos and liked the chord changes of the opening bars, although Greenfield dismissed it because it had been rejected by other artists. Clanton, however, failed to find other suitable songs, and so he chose to record "Venus in Blue Jeans" as a throwaway. Carole King arranged the brass and strings, and was responsible for the distinctive horn section on the opening. Gerry Goffin arranged the muted trumpet in the middle eight. Keller produced the song.

The song was originally listed as the "B" side to the record with "Highway Bound" listed as the "A" side. Radio disc jockeys preferred the "B" side and it became a hit. The pressings of the single listed in error Sedaka as a writer together with Greenfield.

== Charts ==
Chart (1962)	Peak position
Australia (Music Maker)	11
Canada (CHUM Hit Parade)	5
US Billboard Hot 100	7
US Cash Box Top 100	10

== Mark Wynter version ==
"Venus in Blue Jeans"

Single by Mark Wynter
- B-side: "Please Come Back to Me"
- Released: 1962
- Length: 2:09
- Label: Pye
- Songwriter(s): Howard Greenfield; Jack Keller
- Producer(s): Tony Hatch

Mark Wynter recorded a version soon after Clanton's recording was released. The track was produced by Tony Hatch who directed the arrangement, and released on Pye Records. His release succeeded in reaching No. 4 on the UK chart, and became his highest charting song in the UK.

=== Charts ===
Chart (1962)	Peak position
Ireland	6
New Zealand (Lever Hit Parades)	8
UK Singles (OCC)	4

== Other versions ==
Claude François released a French version titled "Vénus en blue-jeans", which reached No. 5 in the Walloon chart in Belgium in 1963.
