= Eruption (British band) =

British disco, R&B and soul recording act

- Origin: United Kingdom
- Genres: Pop, disco, dance-pop, R&B
- Years active: 1969–1985
- Labels: RCA, Hansa, Jupiter

Eruption were a British disco, R&B and soul recording act in the 1970s and 1980s. They are best known for their covers of Ann Peebles's "I Can't Stand the Rain" and Neil Sedaka's "One Way Ticket", which were big disco hits in 1978 and 1979.

== History ==
The band was formed in 1969 as a school band in the United Kingdom as Silent Eruption, and consisted of musicians of Caribbean origins. The group changed the name to Eruption in 1974. Precious Wilson joined the band in 1974 as a backing singer and a year later in 1975, they won the RCA Soul Search contest and their first single "Let Me Take You Back in Time" was released. The group did not find a singer who could replace Lindel Leslie so backing singer Precious Wilson became the lead singer. Their manager signed a contract for several concerts in Germany. In 1977 they went on the road in Germany where they were discovered by Hans-Jörg Mayer who worked as a talent scout for Frank Farian (the producer of Boney M.) Farian signed the group with the Germany-based Hansa Records and the band was the backing band and the support act for Boney M's first European tour.

Their 'comeback' single "Party, Party" did not well in 1977, but their cover of "I Can't Stand the Rain" released in December 1977 was an international hit, reaching No. 1 in Belgium and Australia, No. 5 in the UK Singles Chart and No. 18 in the US Billboard Hot 100. Afterwards, in the spring of 1978, "Party, party" was re-released and became a hit in the Benelux countries. Both songs were included in their first album, released in December 1977. It was followed by their second album titled Leave a Light, launched towards the end of 1978. The first single off the album, "Leave a Light", went largely unnoticed, but the second single, "One Way Ticket" (a cover of Neil Sedaka's song written by Jack Keller and Hank Hunter), catapulted them to the top of the charts (a UK No. 9 hit).

In 1979, Eruption and Boney M. were both featured in the 1979 German film Disco Fever. Precious Wilson left the group in the same year to pursue a solo career and was replaced by singer Kim Davis. The group enjoyed their third German top 10 hit with "Go Johnnie Go" from the third album Fight Fight Fight. Shortly after, a tragedy hit when Davis succumbed to a brain haemorrhage, although some sources claim she died in a car accident. The band decided to continue and singer Jane Jochen stepped in. A new recording, a cover of Del Shannon's "Runaway" was released in December 1980, and peaked at No. 21 in the German charts. After a compilation album in the spring of 1981 and the single release of "You (You Are My Soul)" from Fight Fight Fight, the band signed to Ralph Siegel's Jupiter Records.

By now, without the lead vocals of Precious Wilson, success was drastically diminishing, and the singles from their fourth album Our Way received little notice. In 1983, the drummer Eric Kingsley left Eruption, and Andi Weekes Barbados joined the group to play drums during last two years of the band's activity. In 1985, Eruption disbanded. In 1988, a new version of "I Can't Stand the Rain" was released. In 1994, Farian released the CD Gold – 20 Super Hits which featured five remixed and two original Eruption titles and 13 tracks from Precious Wilson's solo album. The new version of "One Way Ticket" was released as a single in the same year to promote the compilation. In 1997, Wilson became the legal owner of the trademark Eruption. She continues to tour promoting her solo projects, and also as Eruption with her new group, but none of the band's original members perform in the latest line-ups.

== Band members ==
- Greg Perrineau (guitar)
- Morgan Perrineau (bass) (died in July 2026)
- Gerry Williams (keyboards) (1975–1985) (died 14 May 2020)
- Eric Kingsley (drums)
- Lindel Leslie (Leslie Johnson) (lead singer 1975–1976) (died in August 2015)
- Precious Wilson (lead singer 1974–1979)
- Kim Davis (lead singer 1980) (died in 1980)
- Jane Jochen (lead singer 1980–1985)
- Andi Weekes Barbados (drums 1983–1985)

== Discography ==
=== Studio albums ===
Year	Title	Peak chart positions				
Year	Title	AUS	NOR	SWE	US	US R&B
1977	Eruption	14	—	25	133	44
1979	Leave a Light	42	19	—	—	—
1980	Fight Fight Fight	—	—	—	—	—
1983	Our Way	—	—	—	—	—
"—" denotes releases that did not chart.

=== Compilations ===
Hansa

- 1981: The Best of Eruption BMG (This includes tracks from Precious Wilson's solo albums + Eruption)
- 1994: Gold – 20 Super Hits (This includes tracks from Precious Wilson's solo albums + Eruption)
- 1995: I Can't Stand the Rain

Sony Music

- 2006: Best of the Best (previous released as Gold. This includes tracks from Precious Wilson's solo albums + Eruption)
- 2007: Greatest Hits (previous released as Gold)

Big Break Records

- 2017: The Best of Eruption (1981 album + 5 bonus tracks, CD, CDBBRX0365)

=== Singles ===
Year	Title	Peak chart positions													Certifications	Album
Year	Title	UK	AUS	AUT	BEL	GER	IRE	NLD	NOR	SWE	SWI	US	US R&B	US Dance	Certifications	Album
1975	"Let Me Take You Back in Time"	—	—	—	—	—	—	—	—	—	—	—	—	—		—N/a
1977	"Party, Party"	—	—	—	—	—	—	—	—	—	—	—	—	—		Eruption
1977	"I Can't Stand the Rain"	5	1	4	1	7	6	4	6	2	8	18	30	6	BPI: Silver	Eruption
1978	"Computer Love"	—	—	—	—	—	—	—	—	—	—	—	—	—		Eruption
1978	"Party, Party" (re-release)	—	—	—	19	—	—	16	—	—	—	—	—	—		—N/a
1978	"Love Is a Feelin'"	—	—	—	—	—	—	—	—	—	—	—	—	—		—N/a
1978	"Leave a Light"	—	—	—	—	43	—	—	—	—	—	—	—	—		Leave a Light
1979	"One Way Ticket"	9	10	1	2	7	13	5	—	8	1	—	—	30	BPI: Silver	Leave a Light
1980	"Go Johnnie Go"	—	—	12	—	8	—	—	—	—	10	—	—	—		Fight Fight Fight
1980	"Runaway"	—	—	—	—	21	—	—	—	—	—	—	—	—		The Best of Eruption
1981	"You (You Are My Soul)"	—	—	—	—	65	—	—	—	—	—	—	—	—		The Best of Eruption
1981	"In a 1000 Years"	—	—	—	—	—	—	—	—	—	—	—	—	—		Our Way
1982	"Up and Away"	—	—	—	—	—	—	—	—	—	—	—	—	—		—N/a
1982	"Joy to the World"	—	—	—	—	—	—	—	—	—	—	—	—	—		Our Way
1983	"I Can't Help Myself"	—	—	—	—	—	—	—	—	—	—	—	—	—		Our Way
1983	"Sophisticated Lady"	—	—	—	—	—	—	—	—	—	—	—	—	—		—N/a
1985	"Where Do I Begin"	—	—	—	—	—	—	—	—	—	—	—	—	—		—N/a
1988	"I Can't Stand the Rain 88"	—	—	—	—	—	—	—	—	—	—	—	—	—		—N/a
1994	"One Way Ticket (Remix '94)"	—	—	—	—	—	—	—	—	—	—	—	—	—		Gold – 20 Super Hits
"—" denotes releases that did not chart.
