= Run Samson Run =

- US picture sleeve

Single by Neil Sedaka

from the album Neil Sedaka Sings Little Devil and His Other Hits
- B-side: "You Mean Everything to Me"
- Released: 1960
- Recorded: 1960
- Genre: Pop
- Songwriters: Neil Sedaka; Howard Greenfield
- Producer: Al Nevins

Neil Sedaka singles chronology
"You Mean Everything to Me" (1960)	"Run Samson Run" (1960)	"Calendar Girl" (1961)

"Run Samson Run" is a song written by Neil Sedaka and Howard Greenfield and sung by Neil Sedaka. It appears on his album Neil Sedaka Sings Little Devil and His Other Hits. The song was included in Neil Sedaka Sings His Greatest Hits (1959–1963).

== Chart performance ==
The single was released in 1960. It became a hit in US reaching number 28 on the US Billboard Hot 100 chart. As with most of Sedaka's early recordings, Stan Applebaum provided the musical accompaniment. In Canada, the song was co-charted with the a-side 'You Mean Everything To Me' and they reached and No. 2 in Canada.

== Cover versions ==
- In 1963, Hong Kong female singer Chang Loo (張露) (1932–2009), covered this song, under title name of Run Samson Run/英雄美人, in alternate English and Mandarin Chinese language, on her LP album An Evening With Chang Loo with EMI Columbia Records.
