= Bernard Miller (pastor) =

Pastor and founder of New Covenant Fellowship Church

Bernie Miller
- Born: Salisbury, North Carolina
- Occupation: Pastor

Bernard "Bernie" Miller is the founder and Pastor of New Covenant Fellowship Church in Chattanooga, Tennessee. He founded the church in 1996 using census data that allowed him to build a multi-ethnic church to meet the needs of his community.

== Career and early life ==
Miller arrived in Chattanooga in 1990 by way of New York City where he worked as Vice President of artists and repertoire for Sony/Epic Records, from 1987 to 1989. On the Epic roster were over 25 artists including The Jacksons, Michael Jackson and Luther Vandross, respectively. In addition, he wrote several songs for which he received both gold and platinum record awards with the most famous being the Grammy Award winner, "I Can't Stand the Rain." He received Christ as his personal Savior in New York while watching The 700 Club.

The 700 Club selected Miller to be interviewed for their 50th anniversary celebration. Miller was invited to share his testimony live, September 30, 2011 at CBN's black-tie dinner before over 400 longtime partners of The 700 Club.

Miller was born in Salisbury, North Carolina, but his mother moved to Baltimore, MD, when he was 3 years old. He started his radio career in high school, at the age of 16 in Baltimore. The first station for which he worked, WEBB, was owned by James Brown. He is the host of two distinctly different radio programs in Chattanooga: "Power Praise," a Black gospel program on Power94, WJTT; and "Sunday Celebration," a contemporary Christian music program on J103.

In 2010, Miller was named "Man of the Year" from Tennessee and received the "Distinguished Christian Statesman Award" by the Atlanta-based RossReportNews.net Ministries. Miller has received several awards for his work in communications. In 1988, he was the recipient of the "Black Achievers in Industry Award" from the Harlem Branch YMCA of Greater New York. Black Enterprise Magazine voted him one of the country's top 25 broadcasters in 1985 for his work in Chicago with Tom Joyner on WJPC, the Johnson Publishing Company's radio station. Additionally, while in Chicago he received the "Monarch Award in Communications" from the Alpha Kappa Alpha sorority, Xi Nu Omega chapter. In 1994, Miller was voted the most popular Morning Drive radio personality in Chattanooga. Miller hosted a nationally syndicated gospel program that was heard on the Moody Bible broadcasting network.

Miller has served as chairman on numerous boards and advisory panels. Currently, he serves as Chair of the U.S. Census Bureau's African-American Race & Ethnicity Advisory Committee. Furthermore, Miller serves as Chairman of the Tennessee Advisory Committee to the U.S. Commission on Civil Rights. In 2008, Miller requested, and received, an audience with President Obama's transition team to request an additional $150 million to fund the Census Bureau's 2010 advertising campaign and additional dollars to hire more Partnership Specialists.

Miller and his wife were invited to the White House for several key events such as the 50th Anniversary of the Civil Rights Movement, Black Music Month celebration, the First Lady's Summitt, the state arrival ceremony for His Excellency Mwai Kibaki, President of Kenya, the historic signing of the Voting Rights Act and the Medal of Freedom Ceremony honoring civil rights pioneer Dr. Benjamin Hooks.

Miller is a graduate of Covington Theological Seminary. He was the first to receive Covington Seminary's Alumni of the Year award at their 2006 graduation ceremony where he received a Doctorate of Divinity. Miller has also received an honorary Doctor of Philosophy in Theological Studies from St. Thomas Christian College.

In 2010, Miller was named "Man of the Year" from Tennessee and received the "Distinguished Christian Statesman Award" by the Atlanta-based RossReportNews.net Ministries. In 2011, Rainbow/PUSH and the Reverend Jesse Jackson selected Miller to receive the prestigious God's Trombone Award for his excellent service and community achievements.
