= Stairway to Heaven (Neil Sedaka song) =

Single by Neil Sedaka

from the album Neil Sedaka Sings Little Devil and His Other Hits
- B-side: "Forty Winks Away"
- Released: March 1960
- Recorded: February 5, 1960
- Studio: RCA Victor Studio A, New York City
- Genre: Pop
- Length: 2:35
- Label: RCA Victor
- Songwriter(s): Neil Sedaka; Howard Greenfield
- Producer(s): Al Nevins; Don Kirshner

Neil Sedaka singles chronology
"Oh! Carol" (1959)	"Stairway to Heaven" (1960)	"You Mean Everything to Me" (1960)

"Stairway to Heaven" is a song written by Neil Sedaka and Howard Greenfield. It was released as a 45 rpm single and appeared on Sedaka's 1961 album Neil Sedaka Sings Little Devil and His Other Hits.

Sedaka's "Stairway to Heaven" predates by 11 years Led Zeppelin's song of the same name, which was released in 1971 and written by Jimmy Page and Robert Plant. Sedaka remarked in 2021: "You can't copyright a title, so Led Zeppelin, I forgive you!"

== Composition ==
Sedaka described the song as a "sandwich song": the main verses and chorus, the "meat" of the song, are enveloped in a "bread," a short musical snippet repeated at the beginning and end of the song (in this case, the phrase "Climb up, way up high"). The style would become a trademark of Sedaka and Greenfield's compositions of the early 1960s.

== Personnel ==
The personnel includes King Curtis on saxophone, Don Arnone, Art Ryerson and Everett Barksdale on guitar, Milt Hinton on bass, Irving Faberman on timpani and Dave "Panama" Francis on drums. Stan Applebaum arranged and conducted the song, a role he would carry for several more hit songs recorded by Sedaka.

== Reception ==
"Stairway to Heaven" became a hit for Sedaka after "Oh! Carol" (1959). In 1960, it repeated the performance of the previous single by peaking at number nine on the US Billboard Hot 100 chart.

== Chart performance ==
Chart (1960)	Peak position
Canada (CHUM Chart)	16
UK Singles (The Official Charts Company)	8
US Billboard Hot 100	9
