= The Diary (song) =

Single by Neil Sedaka

from the album Rock with Sedaka
- B-side: "No Vacancy (I’m Walkin’ ‘Round)"
- Released: November 1958
- Recorded: October 30, 1958
- Studio: RCA Victor Studio A, New York City
- Genre: Pop
- Length: 2:14
- Label: RCA Victor
- Songwriters: Neil Sedaka; Howard Greenfield
- Producer: Al Nevins

Neil Sedaka singles chronology
"The Diary" (1958)	"I Go Ape" (1959)

"The Diary" is a song written and composed by Neil Sedaka and Howard Greenfield. It was released in late 1958 as Sedaka’s first hit single.

== Background ==
This song's writers, Sedaka and Howard Greenfield, were inspired to write the song after asking for (and being refused) access to their client Connie Francis's diary in hopes of mining it for lyrical material.

They originally wrote this song for Little Anthony & The Imperials. (It had a very similar sound to that group's first hit, "Tears on My Pillow".) The pair took the song to George Goldner, The Imperials' producer, over at End Records, who, although having the group record and release the song as an End Records single, felt that it wasn't quite done the way they felt it should have been done. As a result, the song did not chart.

At around the same time, Sedaka auditioned at RCA Victor with the song. After he became aware of the situation surrounding the song’s failure to chart, Sedaka decided that he should record it himself.

== Reception ==
Sedaka's version became his very first hit. In early 1959, the single reached No. 14 on the US Billboard Hot 100 pop chart, and No. 15 in Canada. It sold about 600,000 copies.

Looking back at the record’s success years later, in 2020, Sedaka marveled that it was "a thrill [and] a dream come true" and that he couldn’t imagine how excited he was when he scored his first hit.

"The Diary" later appeared on Sedaka’s debut studio album Rock with Sedaka. It would also appear in Neil Sedaka Sings Little Devil and His Other Hits (1961) and Neil Sedaka Sings His Greatest Hits (1962), as well as many other compilation albums of his.
