= Calendar Girl (song) =

Single by Neil Sedaka
- B-side: "The Same Old Fool"
- Released: 1960
- Genre: Pop
- Length: 2:32
- Label: RCA Victor
- Songwriters: Neil Sedaka; Howard Greenfield
- Producers: Al Nevins; Don Kirshner

Neil Sedaka singles chronology
"Run Samson Run" (1960)	"Calendar Girl" (1960)	"Little Devil" (1961)

"Calendar Girl" is a song by Neil Sedaka. The music was composed by Sedaka and the lyrics by Howard Greenfield. Released in December 1960 as a single, it was a hit single for Sedaka, peaking at No. 4 on the US charts, No. 3 in Australia, and No. 1 on the Canadian (3 weeks) and Japanese charts.

== Background ==
Sedaka borrowed inspiration from multiple sources for the music, incorporating a shuffle beat after hearing "Personality" by Lloyd Price, a chord progression that was common in the music of Al Jolson and Eddie Cantor, along with another progression from the end of Ricky Nelson's hit record "Travelin' Man."

Record producer Joe Viglione, writing for AllMusic, describes the song as a G-rated calendar of pin-ups such as Betty Grable and Marilyn Monroe, using verbal rather than visual imagery. Each month gives a different reason for the singer's affection for the titular character, and September—"I light the candles at your sweet sixteen"—was a lyrical motif that Howard Greenfield frequently used at the time, including in "Happy Birthday Sweet Sixteen," released later the same year. Other months in the song reference Valentine's Day in February, the Easter Bunny in April, a junior prom in May and June.

Instrumentation on the song was provided by Stan Applebaum and His Orchestra, with Gary Chester on drums.

The song was released to a 45 rpm single backed with a country-and-western song, "The Same Old Fool". Both songs were also released on a Compact 33 Single, a short-lived format that RCA Victor promoted in the early 1960s.

== Promotional video ==
A Scopitone promotional clip for the song was filmed in color in 1966, several years after the song was a hit (and at a time when Sedaka's star power had faded). It consists of Neil Sedaka playing the piano and dancing alongside four models (including his wife Leba), on a mock stage made to resemble calendar themes. It was somewhat unusual among American Scopitones in that the film matched the content of the song; Scopitones of the mid-1960s were noted for their disjointedness.

== Reception ==
"Calendar Girl" became Sedaka's sixth hit in two years, but was also his first top-five record. The song peaked at No. 4 on the US Billboard chart and No. 1 on the Canadian (3wks@1) and Japanese chart in 1961. In New Zealand, the song reached No. 7. The recording peaked at number 8 in the UK, as well as a top 5 in Australia.

== Chart history ==
=== Weekly charts ===
Chart (1960–1961)	Peak position
Australia (Kent Music Report)	3
Canada CHUM Chart	1
Japan	1
New Zealand (Lever Hit Parade)	7
UK Singles Chart	8
U.S. Billboard Hot 100	4
U.S. Cash Box Top 100	4

=== Year-end charts ===
Chart (1961)	Rank
U.S. Billboard Hot 100	33

== Covers ==
Petula Clark recorded a French-language cover of this song, Tout Au Long Du Calendrier.

The Swedish group Sven-Ingvars Kvartett recorded a version of Calendar Girl on their second EP "Pony Time" in 1961.

In 1963, Dee Dee Sharp recorded "Calendar Boy" published by Cameo Parkway Records.

In 1973, Tirso Cruz III under Vicor Music Philippines.

In 1976, Purina Cat Chow started a commercial campaign using a track called "Calendar Cat". This song used the tune from Neil Sedaka's "Calendar Girl", and included lyrics which were altered.

In 1977, Tina Arena and John Bowles recorded a version for their album "Tiny Tina and Little John".

In 1978, The Beach Boys recorded a version of "Calendar Girl" with Mike Love on lead. This version was never released by The Beach Boys but was re-recorded by Mike Love for his first solo album, Looking Back with Love.

In 1991, Mexican pop band La onda vaselina recorded a version in Spanish entitled "Calendario de Amor".

Also in 1991, Sedaka recorded a new version of "Calendar Girl", which was included as the B-side of his newly released single "The Miracle Song".

In 1998, Brazilian singer Eliana recorded the song on his sixth studio album, titled "Um Calendário do Amor".

In 2012, J-Pop singer Aimer recorded the song on her cover album Bitter & Sweet.

In 2013, Shakey Graves recorded a cover of "Calendar Girl" for his album Story Of My Life.

== Personnel ==
The personnel on the original recording include Al Caiola, Buck Pizzarelli, Art Ryerson and Bill Suyker on guitar, George Duvivier on bass, Ernie Hayes on piano, Jerome Richardson on sax, and David "Panama" Francis on drums.
