= Oh! Carol =

- Side A of U.S. single

Single by Neil Sedaka

from the album Neil Sedaka Sings Little Devil and His Other Hits
- B-side: "One Way Ticket (To the Blues)"
- Released: September 1959
- Recorded: July 31, 1959
- Studio: RCA Victor Studio A, New York City
- Genre: Pop; rock and roll
- Length: 2:15
- Label: RCA Victor
- Songwriters: Neil Sedaka; Howard Greenfield
- Producer: Al Nevins

Neil Sedaka singles chronology
"Crying My Heart Out for You" (1959)	"Oh! Carol" (1959)	"Stairway to Heaven" (1960)

"Oh! Carol" is an international hit written by American singer, songwriter and pianist Neil Sedaka and Howard Greenfield in early 1959, and recorded by Sedaka.

The song is noted for Sedaka's spoken recitation of the verse, the second time around. It was written explicitly as a sound-alike to other popular hit records of the era, after his previous single had sold so poorly that his record label threatened to drop him if his next record was not a hit.

It spent 18 weeks on the U.S. Billboard Hot 100 pop chart, reaching #9 on December 6, 1959, while reaching #3 on the UK's New Musical Express chart. It also earned Sedaka his first #1 ranking when it went to #1 in the Netherlands and Wallonia. After its release as a single, it was included in the 1961 album Neil Sedaka Sings Little Devil and His Other Hits.

On October 7, 1972, it entered the UK chart again at #49 and charted for 14 weeks, peaking at #19 on December 2, 1972.

"Carol" was a reference to Carol Klein, Sedaka's ex-girlfriend from high school. Klein, who later adopted the stage name Carole King, recalled upon Sedaka's death that she herself had wanted to become a professional songwriter and used the success of Sedaka's record to get into the business. She and her then-husband Gerry Goffin found work at the Brill Building at the same firm Sedaka was working—Aldon Music—with their first record for them being a jocular answer song, "Oh, Neil," which she herself recorded.

The B-side song, "One Way Ticket", also earned Sedaka a No. 1 ranking in Japan for several months in 1960.

== Charts ==
Chart (1959–1960)	Peak position
Belgium (Ultratop Flanders)	2
Belgium (Ultratop Wallonia)	1
Canada (CHUM Hit Parade)	4
France (IFOP)	34
Italy	2
Netherlands (Single Top 100)	1
Norway (VG-lista)	9
UK (New Musical Express)	3
US Billboard Hot 100	9
US Hot R&B Sides (Billboard)	27
US Cash Box Top 100	5
West Germany (GfK)	25

Chart (1972)	Peak position
UK Singles (OCC)	14

== Sales ==
Sales for Oh! Carol
Region	Sales
Italy	100,000

== Other notable versions ==
- General Saint featuring Don Campbell had a minor UK hit in 1994 with their version of "Oh! Carol", peaking at No. 54. In Iceland, it became a top-40 hit, peaking at No. 36.
