= Little Devil =

Single by Neil Sedaka

from the album Neil Sedaka Sings Little Devil and His Other Hits; Neil Sedaka Sings His Greatest Hits
- B-side: "I Must Be Dreaming"
- Released: April 1961
- Recorded: 1961
- Genre: Pop
- Label: RCA Records
- Songwriters: Neil Sedaka, Howard Greenfield

Neil Sedaka singles chronology
"Calendar Girl" (1961)	"Little Devil" (1961)	"Sweet Little You" (1961)

Music video
- "Little Devil" on YouTube

"Little Devil" is a song written by Neil Sedaka and Howard Greenfield which was recorded by Sedaka and released as a single in 1961. Included in the Sedaka's 1961 album Neil Sedaka Sings Little Devil and His Other Hits, the song was a hit, reaching #11 in the US Billboard Charts. In Canada it was #2 for 2 weeks.

The personnel on the song included: Al Caiola, Bucky Pizzarelli and Charles Macy on guitar; George Duvivier on bass; Phil Kraus on percussion; David "Panama" Francis on drums; Romeo Penque, Sol Schlinger and Herman Yorks on saxophone; Jack Keller and Ernie Hayes on piano; and Harry Lookofsky, Julius Held, David Nadien, Paul Winter, Arnold Eidus and Julius Brand on violins.

== Other language versions ==
"Esagerata" and "Un Giorno Inutile", the Italian-language versions of "Little Devil" and its B-side "I Must Be Dreaming"

"Little Devil" was Sedaka's first song to be translated into Italian, with the title "Esagerata". It also was translated into German as "Crazy Daisy", Spanish as "Diablito", and French, but in the last case it was recorded by the band Les Gendarmes ("Petit Démon"). Danish and Finnish versions also were recorded.
