= I Can't Stand the Rain (song) =

1973 single by Ann Peebles

Single by Ann Peebles

from the album I Can't Stand the Rain
- Released: July 1973
- Recorded: 1973
- Studio: Royal Studios, Memphis, Tennessee
- Genre: Soul; Memphis soul
- Length: 2:31
- Label: Hi
- Songwriters: Ann Peebles; Don Bryant; Bernard "Bernie" Miller
- Producer: Willie Mitchell

Ann Peebles singles chronology
"I'm Gonna Tear Your Playhouse Down" (1973)	"I Can't Stand the Rain" (1973)	"(You Keep Me) Hanging On" (1974)

Official audio
- "Ann Peebles – I Can't Stand the Rain (Official Audio)" on YouTube

"I Can't Stand the Rain" is a song originally recorded by Ann Peebles in 1973, and written by Peebles, Don Bryant, and Bernard "Bernie" Miller. Other notable versions have subsequently been recorded by Eruption and Tina Turner. Missy Elliott sampled it in her song "The Rain (Supa Dupa Fly)". The original version is ranked at 197 on Rolling Stone's 500 Greatest Songs of All Time.

== Ann Peebles version ==
The song was written by Peebles, her partner (and later husband) Don Bryant, and DJ Bernard "Bernie" Miller in 1973:

One evening in Memphis in 1973, soul singer Ann Peebles was meeting friends, including her partner, Hi Records staff writer Don Bryant, to go to a concert. Just as they were about to set off, the heavens opened and Peebles snapped: "I can't stand the rain." As a professional songwriter in constant need of new material, Bryant was used to plucking resonant phrases out of the air and he liked the idea of reacting against recent R&B hits that celebrated bad weather, such as the Dramatics' "In the Rain" and Love Unlimited's "Walkin' in the Rain with the One I Love". So he sat down at the piano and started riffing on the theme, weaving in ideas from Peebles and local DJ Bernie Miller. The song was finished that night and presented the next morning to Hi's studio maestro, Willie Mitchell, who used a brand new gadget, the electric timbale, to create the song's distinctive raindrop riff. It really was that easy. "We didn't go to the concert," Bryant remembers. "We forgot about the concert."

Ann Peebles said: "At first, we had the timbales all the way through the song but as we played the tape, Willie Mitchell said 'what about if the timbales were in front before anything else comes in?'. So we did that and when we listened back I said 'I love it, let's do that'." The organ is played by Charles Hodges, who later said: "We wanted to catch a sound like water dripping. Willie pulled the timbales out and Howard [Grimes] did the low part and Teenie [Hodges] did the high part. It was an overdub." Peebles said: "I have to give Teenie a lot of credit, because he added a lot of licks and details to make it right."

Produced by Willie Mitchell, the song became Peebles' biggest hit when, in 1973, it reached No. 38 on the US Pop Chart and No. 6 on the R&B/Black Chart; it also reached No. 41 on the UK singles chart in April 1974. It was one of John Lennon's favorite songs; he called it "the best song ever". Ian Dury made the song one of his choices when he was the guest for BBC Radio 4's Desert Island Discs in December 1996. Missy "Misdemeanor" Elliott samples Ann Peebles' version of the song on her debut solo single "The Rain (Supa Dupa Fly)".

=== Personnel ===
- Ann Peebles – vocals
- Howard Grimes – drums, percussion
- Charles Hodges – organ
- Leroy Hodges – bass
- Mabon "Teenie" Hodges – guitar, percussion
- Archie Turner – piano
- James Mitchell – saxophone
- Andrew Love – saxophone
- Ed Logan – saxophone
- Wayne Jackson – trumpet
- Willie Mitchell – producer

=== Charts ===
Chart (1973–1974)	Peak position
Australia (Kent Music Report)	79
Canada (RPM)	89
U.S. (Billboard Hot 100)	38

== Eruption version ==
"I Can't Stand the Rain"

Single by Eruption

from the album Eruption
- B-side: "Be Yourself"
- Released: January 23, 1978
- Recorded: 1977
- Genre: Disco; funk
- Length: 3:12
- Label: Hansa
- Songwriters: Ann Peebles, Don Bryant & Bernard "Bernie" Miller
- Producer: Frank Farian

Eruption singles chronology
"I Can't Stand the Rain" (1978)	"Leave a Light" (1978)

In 1978, Eruption released a disco-oriented remake which became the group's biggest hit. It reached the top 10 in many European charts, hitting the No. 1 in Belgium for 2 weeks in March 1978. It was also a No. 1 hit in Australia and reached the top 10 in New Zealand and South Africa. In the U.S., it peaked at No. 6 on the disco chart and reached No. 18 on the Billboard Hot 100.

=== Track listings ===
7" single

1. "I Can't Stand the Rain" – 3:12
2. "Be Yourself" – 3:43

12" single

1. "I Can't Stand the Rain" – 6:24

=== Charts ===
==== Weekly charts ====
Chart (1978)	Peak position
U.S. Billboard Hot 100	18
U.S. Billboard Hot R&B/Hip-Hop Songs	30
U.S. Billboard Hot Dance Club Play	6
Canadian Singles Chart	21
UK Singles Chart	5
Irish Singles Chart	6
German Singles Chart	7
Austrian Singles Chart	4
Swiss Singles Chart	8
Dutch Top 40	4
Belgian Singles Chart	1
French Singles Chart	5
Italian Singles Chart	3
Norwegian Singles Chart	2
Swedish Singles Chart	2
Finnish Singles Chart	15
New Zealand Singles Chart	4
Australian Singles Chart	1
South African Singles Chart	5

==== Year-end charts ====
Year-end chart performance for "I Can't Stand the Rain"
Chart (1978)	Position
Australia (Kent Music Report)	15
Canada (RPM)	162
US Billboard Hot 100	95

== Tina Turner version ==
"I Can't Stand the Rain"

Single by Tina Turner

from the album Private Dancer
- B-side: "Let's Pretend We're Married" (live)
- Released: February 1985 (UK)
- Recorded: 1984
- Studio: Mayfair Studios (London, England)
- Genre: Pop rock; new wave
- Length: 3:41
- Label: Capitol
- Songwriters: Ann Peebles, Don Bryant & Bernard "Bernie" Miller
- Producer: Terry Britten

Tina Turner singles chronology
"Private Dancer" (1985)	"I Can't Stand the Rain" (1985)	"Show Some Respect" (1985)

Licensed audio
- "I Can't Stand the Rain (2015 Remaster)" on YouTube

In 1984 Tina Turner recorded "I Can't Stand the Rain" for her fifth solo studio album, Private Dancer, and released it as a single in early 1985 in Europe. Turner's version would find minor success in the UK, but would be a success in Germany, Austria and Switzerland.

=== Track listings ===
7" single

1. "I Can't Stand the Rain" – 3:40
2. "Let's Pretend We're Married" (live version) – 4:22

12" single

1. "I Can't Stand the Rain" (extended version) – 5:43
2. "Let's Pretend We're Married" (live version) – 4:22
3. "Nutbush City Limits" (live version) – 2:56

=== Chart performance ===
==== Weekly charts ====
Chart (1985)	Peak position
Austria (Ö3 Austria Top 40)	6
Europe (European Top 100)	78
Germany (Official German Charts)	9
Ireland (IRMA)	20
Switzerland (Schweizer Hitparade)	15
UK Singles (Official Charts)	57

==== Year-end charts ====
Chart (1985)	Rank
Austria (Ö3 Austria Top 40)	30

=== Personnel ===
- Tina Turner – lead vocals
- Nick Glennie-Smith – keyboards, synthesizers
- Terry Britten – guitar
- Graham Broad – drums
