= You Mean Everything to Me (song) =

Single by Neil Sedaka
- B-side: "Run Samson Run"
- Released: 1960
- Recorded: 1960
- Genre: Traditional pop, soft rock
- Length: 2:32
- Label: RCA Victor
- Songwriters: Neil Sedaka; Howard Greenfield

Neil Sedaka singles chronology
"Stairway to Heaven" (1960)	"You Mean Everything to Me" (1960)	"Run Samson Run" (1960)

Music video
- "You Mean Everything to Me" on YouTube

"You Mean Everything to Me" is a song co-written and sung by Neil Sedaka.

== Background ==
The song bears similarity to Paul Anka's "You Are My Destiny", and has been covered by many artists in many languages including a Hebrew-language version (written by Chaim Kaynan) which was recorded by Sedaka himself.

== Chart performance ==
It was released in 1960. It became a hit in the US reaching #17 on the US Billboard chart, and No. 2 in Canada.
