= Jack Keller (songwriter) =

American composer, songwriter and record producer (1936–2005)

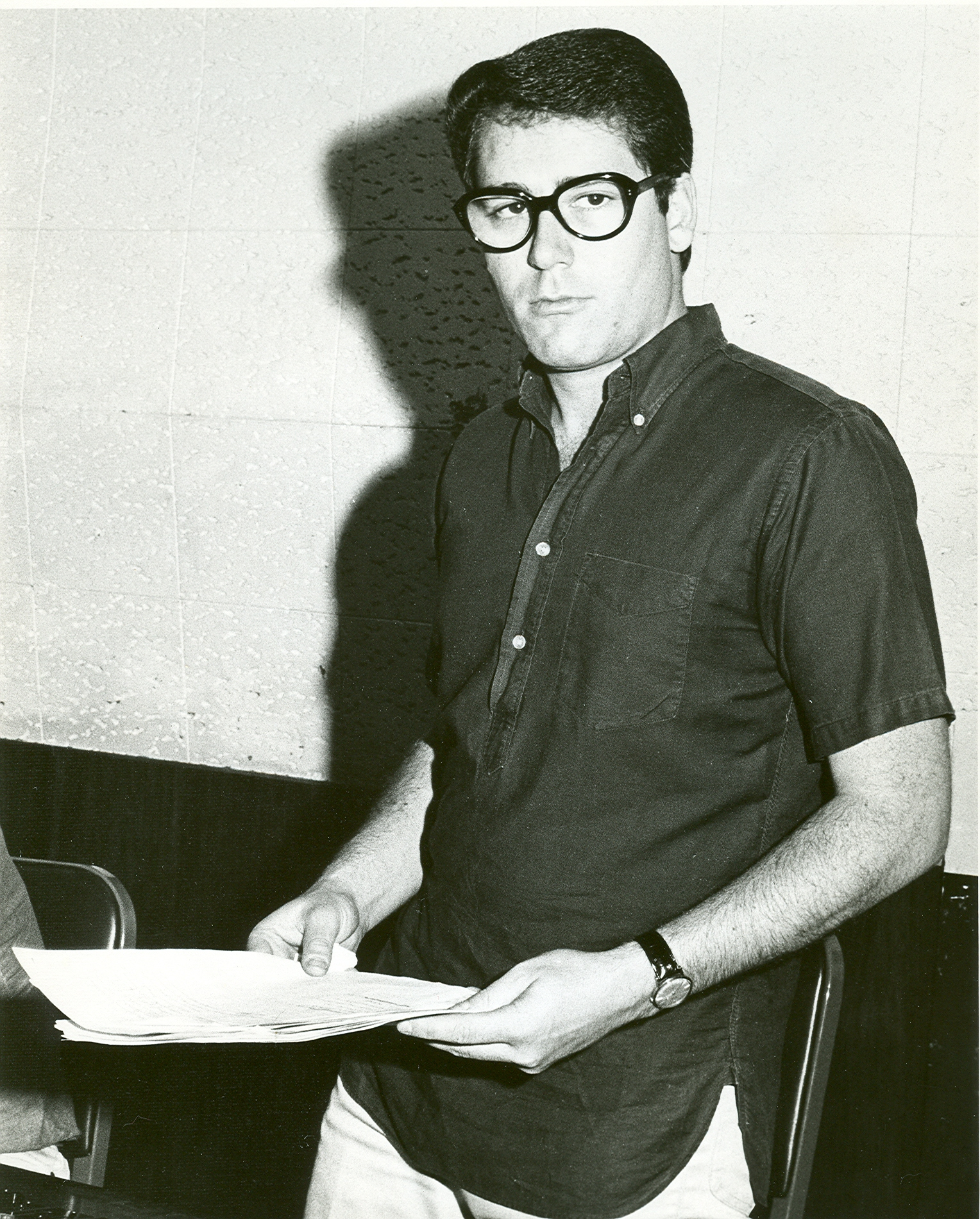
- Keller in the early 1960s

Background information
- Born: Jack Walter Keller; November 11, 1936; Brooklyn, New York, U.S.
- Died: April 1, 2005 (aged 68) Nashville, Tennessee, U.S.
- Occupations: Songwriter, record producer
- Website: www.jackkellersongwriter.com

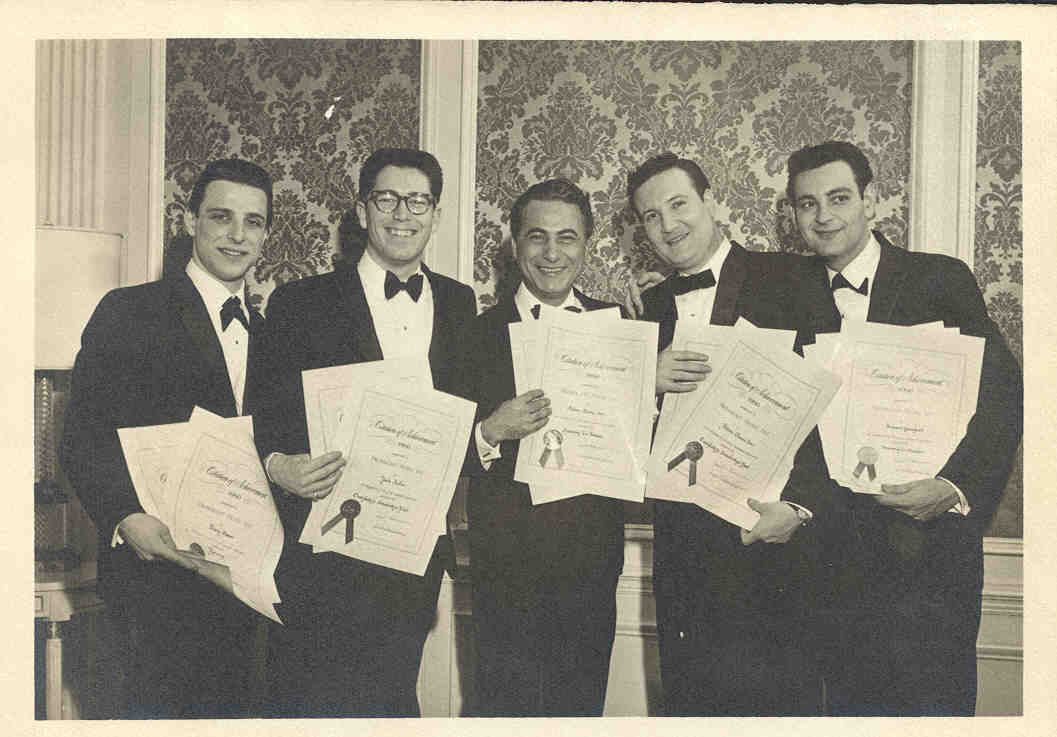
Barry Mann, Jack Keller, Al Nevins, Don Kirshner and Howard Greenfield at the 1962 BMI Awards

Jack Walter Keller (born James Walter Keller; 11 November 1936 – 1 April 2005) was an American composer, songwriter and record producer. He co-wrote, with Howard Greenfield and others, several pop hits in the late 1950s and early 1960s, including "Just Between You and Me", "Everybody's Somebody's Fool", "My Heart Has a Mind of Its Own", "Venus in Blue Jeans" and "Run to Him". He also wrote the theme songs for TV series including Bewitched and Gidget, and later worked in Los Angeles – where he wrote for, and produced, The Monkees – and in Nashville.

== Biography ==
Keller was born in Brooklyn, New York, the son of dance band musician Mal Keller and his wife Reva. He learned the accordion and piano, and worked in a camera repair store at the age of 15 following his father's death. He also began playing in dance bands, and started writing songs with his friend Paul Kaufman. In the mid 1950s, he started hanging around the Brill Building, the heart of "Tin Pan Alley" in New York City, and was introduced to lyricist Lee Cathy. Their first collaboration, "Just Between You and Me", was recorded by The Chordettes and became a top ten hit in 1957. He also collaborated with Noel Sherman, and their songs were recorded by Perry Como and The Kalin Twins.

In 1959, he was one of the first songwriters to sign an exclusive contract with Aldon Music, the music publishing company established by Don Kirshner and Al Nevins. Keller began working with and developing a young writing staff that included Carole King, Gerry Goffin, Neil Sedaka, and Howard Greenfield. Between 1960 and 1963, Aldon Music had 54 top ten songs.

After Sedaka began a performing career, Keller worked with Greenfield, and the pair jointly co-wrote two number-one hits for Connie Francis in 1960, "Everybody's Somebody's Fool" and "My Heart Has a Mind of Its Own", as well as the follow-up "Breakin' In A Brand New Broken Heart". Keller and Greenfield also co-wrote Jimmy Clanton's 1962 top ten hit "Venus in Blue Jeans"; and "Your Used to Be", a chart hit for Brenda Lee. At the same time, Keller wrote successfully with lyricist Gerry Goffin, including Bobby Vee's No. 2 hit "Run to Him" as well as several hits for The Everly Brothers, and co-wrote with Hank Hunter, including the McGuire Sisters' hit "Just For Old Time's Sake" and Sedaka's "One Way Ticket," later a hit for Eruption.

When Aldon was sold to Columbia Pictures (Screen Gems) in 1963, the company began securing new film and television contracts. Keller and Greenfield wrote the theme songs for two highly successful TV series, Bewitched and Gidget, in 1964 and 1965. Both Greenfield and Keller moved to Los Angeles, California in 1966. As well as continuing to write theme songs for TV, his compositions were recorded by such musicians as Frank Sinatra, Ray Charles and Louis Armstrong.

When Don Kirshner and Screen Gems launched The Monkees in 1966, Keller co-produced their first album, and co-wrote several of their songs including "Your Auntie Grizelda" and "Early Morning Blues and Greens", both written with Diane Hildebrand. Keller and Hildebrand also wrote Bobby Sherman's 1970 hit, "Easy Come, Easy Go". He later worked for United Artists Music in Hollywood.

In 1984 he moved to Nashville, Tennessee, where he wrote songs recorded by leading country stars including Ernest Tubb, Crystal Gayle, Eddy Arnold, Loretta Lynn and Reba McEntire. On November 11, 2013, one of Keller's arrangements, Stephen Foster's Beautiful Dreamer, appeared on the Beatles' album On Air – Live at the BBC Volume 2 – recorded live on January 22, 1963 – showing that Keller and his fellow 'Brill Building' songwriters were influential on the Beatles in their formative years. (Keller had written additional lyrics to Foster's song.)

He died of leukemia at the age of 68.
