= Happy Birthday Sweet Sixteen =

- Reissue single

Single by Neil Sedaka

from the album Neil Sedaka Sings His Greatest Hits
- B-side: "Don't Lead Me On"
- Released: November 1961
- Recorded: 1961
- Genre: Pop
- Length: 2:40
- Label: RCA Victor
- Songwriters: Neil Sedaka and Howard Greenfield

Neil Sedaka singles chronology
"Sweet Little You" (1961)	"Happy Birthday Sweet Sixteen" (1961)	"King of Clowns" (1962)

"Happy Birthday Sweet Sixteen" is a pop song released in 1961 by Neil Sedaka. Sedaka wrote the music and performed the song, while the lyrics were written by Howard Greenfield. The song is noted for being similar in musical structure to Take Good Care of My Baby by Bobby Vee (another 1961 hit), and additionally for its resemblance to the melody of the Chiffons' subsequent 1963 hit "One Fine Day". Both of these songs exhibiting similarity to "Happy Birthday Sweet Sixteen" were penned by the team of Carole King and Gerry Goffin (King and Sedaka were close friends in high school, and Sedaka was known for his appropriation of other popular song motifs in his work). The song reached No. 6 on the Billboard Hot 100 chart and No. 3 on the UK Singles Chart. In Canada it was No. 5 for 2 weeks.

== Background ==
The narrator sings the song to a younger acquaintance who had up to that point had more of a sibling-like relationship (“when you were only six, I was your big brother”) upon her sixteenth birthday, reminiscing about the ups and downs of their friendship thus far and declaring that now that she has grown from a gawky tomboy (comparing her younger self to the subject of the Rodgers and Hart song "My Funny Valentine") to a radiant, feminine beauty, he wants her for his sweetheart. Greenfield wrote the song out of a flippant comment Sedaka had made regarding their success up to that time: "you could write a birthday song and it'd be a hit."

This was one of several Sedaka recordings that employed the services of drummer Gary Chester. Other musicians on the record include Al Casamenti, Art Reyerson and Charles Macey on guitar, Ernie Hayes on piano, George Duviver on bass, Artie Kaplan on sax, Seymour Barab and Morris Stonzek on cellos, David Guillet, Joseph Haber, Louie Haber, Harold Kohon, David Sackson, Maurice Stine, Louis Stone, and Arnold Goldberg on violins, and Phil Kraus and George Devens on percussion.

A year after the song became a hit, Sedaka's brother-in-law, chemist Ed Grossman, wrote lyrics for a sequel song from the sixteen-year-old's perspective. In "It Hurts to Be Sixteen", the female singer laments her "in-between" state between childhood and adulthood, insisting she has fallen in love but that those around her insist she is too young. "It Hurts to Be Sixteen", with a melody written by Sedaka, was a minor hit for Andrea Carroll (herself 16 at the time she recorded it) in 1963.

== Chart history ==
=== Weekly charts ===
Chart (1961–62)	Peak position
Australia	4
Canada (CHUM Hit Parade)	5
New Zealand (Lever Hit Parade)	7
UK	3
US Billboard Hot 100	6
US Cash Box Top 100	9

=== Year-end charts ===
Chart (1961)	Rank
UK	33
US (Joel Whitburn's Pop Annual)	60

== Other versions ==
- A Bobby Vee version was released on the album "30 Big Hits from the 60's" in 1964.
- The Swedish dansband Flamingokvintetten in 1968 recorded a cover of the song that reached #1 in the Swedish charts Tio i Topp and Kvällstoppen. They also recorded a Swedish version of the song, named "Hon är sexton år i dag" reaching Svensktoppen the same year.
- A version called "Happy Birthday, Twenty-One" with a special lyric by Ian Whitcomb and sung by Mae West was released on her Great Balls of Fire album in 1972 on MGM Records. She also sang the song in the 1978 film Sextette.
- In 1975, Davey Page released a version of the song, which peaked at number 57 on the Australian charts.
- In 1983, Kyoko Koizumi did a Japanese cover of the song called "素敵な16才" for her cassette only Extended Play; Separation Kyoko in 1983.
- In 2009, Damian McGinty of Celtic Thunder included the song on their album Take Me Home.
- In the Roseanne episode "Pretty in Black" (Season Five), Roseanne, Dan and several of their friends sing the first chorus of this song to a mortified Darlene at her "sweet sixteen" party. A version of the song by an uncredited performer is also played over the closing credits of the episode.
- In an episode of King of Queens Arthur Spooner, played by Jerry Stiller claims that he inspired Sedaka to this song. In the end of this episode Sedaka appears as himself.
- The Chilling Adventures of Sabrina used the song in their first trailer.
- Neil Diamond recorded the song for his 1993 album Up on the Roof: Songs from the Brill Building.
