= Don Kirshner =

American songwriter, publisher, music producer, manager (1934–2011)

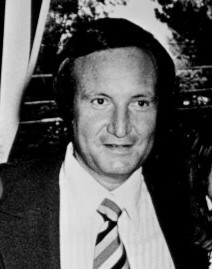
- A PR photo of Kirshner while he was celebrating the anniversary of his show, Rock Concert, in 1974
- Born: Donald Kirshner; April 17, 1934; New York, New York, U.S.
- Died: January 17, 2011 (aged 76); Boca Raton, Florida, U.S.
- Resting place: Temple Beth El Mausoleum, Boca Raton, Florida
- Education: Upsala College
- Occupations: Music publisher; record producer; talent manager; songwriter
- Years active: 1950s–2011
- Known for: Don Kirshner's Rock Concert
- Spouse: Sheila Grod Kirshner (m. 1959)
- Children: 2, including Ricky Kirshner
- Parent(s): Gilbert Kirshner; Belle Jaffe

Donald Kirshner (April 17, 1934 – January 17, 2011) was an American music publisher, music consultant, rock music producer, talent manager, and songwriter. Dubbed "the Man with the Golden Ear" by Time, he was best known for managing songwriting talent as well as successful pop groups including the Monkees, Kansas, and the Archies.

== Early life ==
Don Kirshner was born to a Jewish family in the Bronx, New York, the son of Gilbert Kirshner, a tailor, and Belle Jaffe. He graduated from George Washington High School in Washington Heights, Manhattan and studied at Upsala College in East Orange, New Jersey. After graduation he went to work for Vanderbilt Music, a small music publishing company owned by former Tin Pan Alley lyricist Al Lewis. Kirshner introduced Lewis to Sylvester Bradford, an African American songwriter. Lewis and Bradford wrote "Tears on My Pillow", which was a big hit for Little Anthony and the Imperials in 1958.

== Aldon Music ==
Kirshner achieved his first major success in the late 1950s and early 1960s as co-owner of the influential New York-based publishing company Aldon Music with partner Al Nevins, which had under contract at various times several of the most important songwriters of the so-called "Brill Building" school, including Carole King, Gerry Goffin, Neil Sedaka, Neil Diamond, Paul Simon, Phil Spector, Howard Greenfield, Barry Mann, Cynthia Weil, Tony Orlando, and Jack Keller.

As a producer-promoter, Kirshner was instrumental in launching the careers of singers and songwriters, including Bobby Darin, with whom he collaborated on a number of advertising jingles and pop "ditties" - their first was called "Bubblegum Pop". He was also responsible for finding Tony Orlando, Neil Diamond, Carole King, and Sarah Dash of Labelle, as well as discovering rock acts such as Kansas.

== Kirshner's record labels ==
Kirshner had three record labels. The first was Chairman Records, a subsidiary of London Records. Although he was responsible for scores of hits in the 1960s, he was only to have one on the Chairman label – 1963's "Martian Hop" by The Ran-Dells – which reached number 16 nationally. Kirshner later had two other record labels: Calendar Records, which had early hits by the Archies, and later morphed into the Kirshner label, which had later hits by the Archies and Kansas. Calendar/Kirshner recordings were first distributed by RCA Records, then CBS Records. Kirshner was also involved in Dimension Records.

== Music for TV shows ==
In the early 1960s, Kirshner was a successful music publisher as head of his own company, Aldon Music, which later was sold to Screen Gems-Columbia Music. With Al Nevins, Kirshner brought performers such as Bobby Darin together with songwriters and musicians. He later became president of Colgems Records in 1966.

Kirshner was hired by the producers of The Monkees to provide hit-worthy songs to accompany the television program, within a demanding schedule. Kirshner used songwriting talent from his Brill Building stable of writers and musicians to create catchy, engaging tracks which the band could pretend to perform on the show. This was required to keep up with the demanding schedule.

The formula worked phenomenally well – the singles "Last Train to Clarksville", written by Tommy Boyce and Bobby Hart, and "I'm a Believer", written by Neil Diamond, were, along with the first two Monkees albums, produced and released in time to catch the initial wave of the television program's popularity. After a year, the Monkees wanted a chance to play their own instruments on the records. They also wanted more control over which songs would be released as singles. The matter reached a breaking point over a disagreement regarding the Neil Diamond-penned "A Little Bit Me, A Little Bit You" in early 1967. The song's release by Kirshner as a single, without Columbia Pictures' consent, led to his dismissal.

Kirshner's later venture was the Archies, an animated series where there were only studio musicians to be managed. He was a music consultant or music supervisor for nearly two dozen TV series between 1966 and 1977, such as Bewitched. One instance brought Phil Spector, Tommy Boyce and Bobby Hart together on the TV show I Dream of Jeannie, a program on which Don Kirshner was credited as music consultant for 35 episodes from 1966 to 1967.

== Producer ==
From 1970 to 1979, Kirshner served as producer or executive producer for a number of made for TV movies, TV specials, and TV series. One of those series was the musical game show Musical Chairs, notable for being the first game show hosted by an African-American, Adam Wade.

== Don Kirshner's Rock Concert ==
In the fall of 1972, Kirshner was asked by ABC Television to serve as executive producer and "creative consultant" for their new In Concert series, which aired every other week in the 11:30 p.m. slot normally showing The Dick Cavett Show. The following September, Kirshner left In Concert to produce and host his own syndicated weekly rock-concert program called Don Kirshner's Rock Concert. With its long-form live performances, it was a new direction for pop music presentation on television as compared to rehearsed, often lip-synced performances that were the staple of earlier television shows like Shindig!. The last show aired in 1981, the year that MTV was launched.

The program presented many of the most successful bands of the era, usually rock and roll but occasionally from other genres, each time introduced by Kirshner's trademark monotone delivery as the program host. In its final season, Rock Concert was mostly hosted by Kirshner's son and daughter, whose delivery was similar as their father's. Kirshner's "wooden" presentation style was later lampooned on Saturday Night Live by Paul Shaffer, most notably in Shaffer's introduction of the Blues Brothers during the duo's television debut. Shaffer and Kirshner worked together on the short-lived situation comedy, A Year at the Top, which Kirshner co-produced with Norman Lear, and in which Shaffer starred.

== Later career ==
Kirshner received the 2007 Songwriters Hall of Fame Abe Olman Publishing Award. He was a creative consultant for Rockrena, a company founded by Jack Wishna, and launched in 2011 to promote new music talent online. He died of heart failure in a Boca Raton, Florida hospital on January 17, 2011 at age 76, survived by his wife of 50 years, Sheila; his son, Ricky Kirshner; daughter, Daryn Lewis; and five grandchildren.

On April 14, 2012, Kirshner was posthumously inducted into the Rock and Roll Hall of Fame.
