= Stan Applebaum =

American composer, arranger, and conductor (1922–2019)

- Born: Stanley Seymour Applebaum; March 1, 1922; Newark, New Jersey, U.S.
- Died: February 23, 2019 (aged 96)
- Genres: Pop, classical
- Occupations: Arranger, composer, musician
- Instrument: Piano
- Years active: 1940s–2019

Stanley Seymour Applebaum (March 1, 1922 – February 23, 2019) was an American composer, arranger, musician and conductor. He arranged the orchestration on many pop hit records, most notably in the early 1960s, including The Drifters' "Save the Last Dance for Me"; Ben E. King's "Spanish Harlem" and "Stand By Me"; Brian Hyland's "Sealed with a Kiss"; and Neil Sedaka's "Breaking Up Is Hard to Do".

== Life and career ==
Applebaum was born in Newark, New Jersey, United States. He started playing piano aged 7, after a doctor suggested it would help heal a broken finger, and began taking lessons. By the age of 12 he had started writing arrangements for his school band, and played at local weddings and events, and in clubs. He wrote arrangements for Cootie Williams, Lucky Millinder, and others, before serving in World War II in Germany, where he joined the US Army band. After leaving the military, he joined music publishers Edwin H. Morris & Co, and began composing. His reputation as an arranger grew, and he worked with bandleaders such as Benny Goodman, Harry James and Charlie Ventura, as well as Jimmy Durante. He is co-credited as writer of the Billy Eckstine and Sarah Vaughan hit "Passing Strangers". Mort Palitz of Jubilee Records asked Applebaum to arrange songs on a 1958 album, Scotch Mist, by Marilynn Lovell, and he also orchestrated Al Martino's 1959 album Swing Along.

He stated

I learned different types of music and got gigs playing Greek, Polish, Italian and Jewish weddings. This diversity and understanding of different styles kept growing every day and became one of my most valuable skills for the rest of my life.

He studied under German composer Stefan Wolpe, and became acquainted with fellow student Mike Stoller. Working with Leiber and Stoller, Applebaum began orchestrating some of their recordings. He arranged the orchestration on "There Goes My Baby" by the Drifters, the first R&B record to use strings, and continued to work with the two producers and lead singer Ben E. King on his solo hits "Spanish Harlem" and "Stand By Me". Among the other recording artists whose hits were arranged by Applebaum were Connie Francis, Neil Sedaka, Brook Benton, Brian Hyland, Joanie Sommers, and Bobby Vinton. In all, Applebaum is credited with working on over 25 top 10 hit records. In 1963, Warner Bros. Records released the album Hollywood's Bad but Beautiful Girls, credited to Applebaum and featuring his piano playing.

Applebaum was also a prolific writer of over 1,500 commercials, notably writing the Pan Am jingle "Makes the Going Great" – later the basis of a ballet by George Balanchine – and winning four Clio Awards. He also wrote a number of piano instruction books. From the 1980s, he was for fifteen years the principal orchestrator and arranger for the New York Pops. He wrote for orchestras including the New York Philharmonic and the London Philharmonic. He also wrote the orchestrations for the 1986 Broadway musical, Raggedy Ann.

In 2018, he donated his archives to the New York Public Library for the Performing Arts. He died in 2019, aged 96.
