= Howard Greenfield =

American lyricist and songwriter (1936–1986)

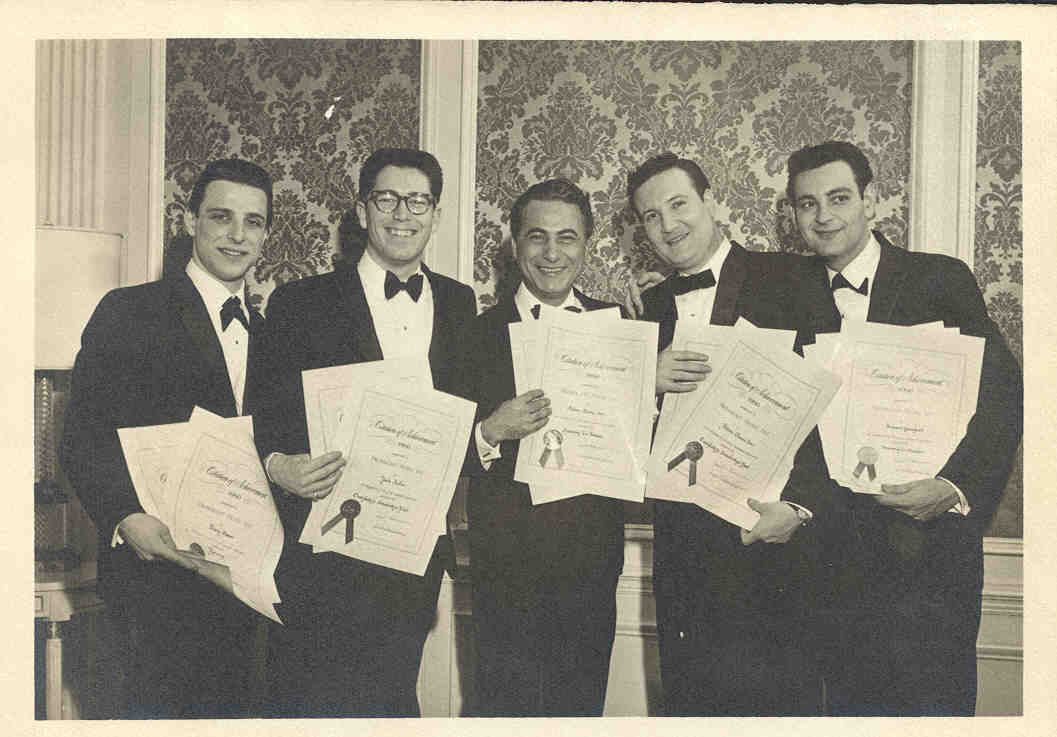
- Greenfield, at far right, at the 1962 BMI Awards

Background information
- Born: March 15, 1936; Brooklyn, New York, U.S.
- Died: March 4, 1986 (aged 49) Los Angeles, California, U.S.
- Occupations: Lyricist and songwriter

Howard Greenfield (March 15, 1936 – March 4, 1986) was an American lyricist and songwriter, who for several years in the 1960s worked out of the Brill Building. He is best known for his successful songwriting collaborations, including one with Neil Sedaka from the late 1950s to the mid-1970s, and near-simultaneous (and equally successful) songwriting partnerships with Jack Keller and Helen Miller throughout most of the 1960s.

== Songs ==
Greenfield co-wrote four songs that reached #1 on the US Billboard charts: "Breaking Up Is Hard to Do", as recorded by Sedaka; "Everybody's Somebody's Fool" and "My Heart Has a Mind of Its Own", both as recorded by Connie Francis, and "Love Will Keep Us Together", as recorded by Captain & Tennille.

He also co-wrote numerous other top 10 hits for Sedaka (including "Oh! Carol", "Stairway to Heaven", "Calendar Girl", "Little Devil", "Happy Birthday Sweet Sixteen", and "Next Door to an Angel"); Francis (including the "Theme to Where The Boys Are" and "Breakin' In A Brand New Broken Heart"); the Everly Brothers ("Crying in the Rain"); Jimmy Clanton ("Venus in Blue Jeans") and the Shirelles ("Foolish Little Girl"). Greenfield also co-wrote the theme songs to numerous 1960s TV series, including Gidget, Bewitched, The Flying Nun and Hazel.

In 2005, "(Is This the Way to) Amarillo", a song Greenfield had written with Sedaka in the early 1970s, reached #1 on the UK charts in the original 1971 version by Tony Christie. The video featured an all-star celebrity line-up lip-synching the track, and the proceeds went to charity. The record stayed at #1 for 7 weeks.

== Career ==
Born in Brooklyn, New York City, by his late teens Greenfield formed a songwriting partnership with Neil Sedaka, a friend whom he had first met as a teenager when they both lived in the same apartment building, in the Brighton Beach section of Brooklyn. Greenfield was educated at Abraham Lincoln High School.

Their first recorded compositions took up both sides of the 1956 non-charting debut single by the Tokens, of which Sedaka (but not Greenfield) was briefly a member. They then went on to supply the song "Passing Time" to the Cookies, as well as other non-hit singles to vocal groups the Clovers and the Cardinals. At this point, though their songs were being recorded, the income derived from these songs was minimal, and Greenfield worked as a messenger for National Cash Register.

In 1958, Greenfield and Sedaka signed to Al Nevins and Don Kirshner's Aldon Music as songwriters, which had offices at 1650 Broadway in New York. (The company later moved to the Brill Building.) In their first year there, Greenfield and Sedaka wrote material for Jimmy Clanton and Bobby Darin, and scored their first major pop hit single with Connie Francis' "Stupid Cupid", which hit #14 on the US pop charts in September 1958. They also wrote Francis' later hits, "Fallin'", "Frankie", and the "Theme to Where the Boys Are," the film in which she starred.

When, in 1958, Sedaka signed to RCA Records as a solo artist, he and Greenfield composed a string of hits for Sedaka to record – among them "The Diary", "Oh! Carol", "Stairway to Heaven", "Calendar Girl", "Little Devil", "Happy Birthday Sweet Sixteen", "Next Door to an Angel" and the chart-topping "Breaking Up Is Hard to Do". Sedaka's recordings eventually sold a combined 25 million records.

As Sedaka's promotional and touring commitments began taking up more and more of his time, Kirshner encouraged Greenfield to collaborate with other Aldon writers. Beginning in 1960, Greenfield began a regular collaboration with Jack Keller; they would write songs together every Monday and Wednesday for six straight years.

Successful Greenfield/Keller collaborations included two consecutive US #1 hits for Connie Francis, "Everybody's Somebody's Fool" and "My Heart Has a Mind of Its Own". They wrote another Francis top 10 hit, "Breakin' in a Brand New Broken Heart", Jimmy Clanton's top 10 hit "Venus in Blue Jeans", as well as songs recorded by Frank Sinatra, Ernest Tubb, Patti Page and Brenda Lee. Greenfield and Keller also supplied the theme music for U.S. television programs such as Gidget and Bewitched.

Greenfield also collaborated with other Aldon songwriters, including Helen Miller, with whom he co-wrote "Foolish Little Girl" (the Shirelles' final Top Ten hit), "It Hurts to Be in Love", originally intended for Neil Sedaka but ultimately recorded by Gene Pitney, as well as a new theme for the TV series Hazel for its fourth season. He also collaborated with Bill Buchanan recording a novelty record called "The Invasion" as Buchanan and Greenfield in 1964.

As well, Greenfield's one and only collaboration with Aldon songwriter Carole King resulted in "Crying in the Rain", a top ten hit for the Everly Brothers in 1962. The collaboration came about when, on a whim, two Aldon songwriting partnerships decided to switch partners for a day—Gerry Goffin (who normally worked with King) partnered with Jack Keller, leaving King and Greenfield to work as a pair for the day. Despite the commercial success of their collaboration, King and Greenfield never wrote another song together.

Sedaka and Greenfield also continued to work together as Sedaka's schedule allowed. After Sedaka's singing career cooled in 1963, they kept writing hits for other artists, including the 5th Dimension's and Tom Jones' "Puppet Man".

Greenfield moved to Los Angeles in 1966, but still continued to collaborate with Sedaka and Keller, both of whom moved to California within a year or two of Greenfield.

Sedaka began working with other lyricists in 1970 (most prominently Philip Cody, who wrote most of the songs for Sedaka's 1970s comeback), though he and Greenfield still occasionally worked together after this time. Sedaka and Greenfield were increasingly argumentative near the end of their collaboration and ended their songwriting partnership in 1973. Their last collaboration, appropriately named "Our Last Song Together", would be a minor hit for Bo Donaldson and The Heywoods. In 1975, their song "Love Will Keep Us Together" (originally recorded by Sedaka in 1973) topped the Billboard Hot 100 chart in a cover version by Captain & Tennille, as well as earning a Grammy Award for Record of the Year. This version of "Love..." was the best-selling single of the year.

Sedaka had a substantial hit in 1975 with a drastically re-arranged version of the Greenfield/Sedaka composition "Breaking Up Is Hard to Do". As well, a re-release of the Greenfield/Sedaka song "Is This The Way To Amarillo" (originally a UK hit for Tony Christie in 1971) became the UK's best-selling record of 2005.

Sedaka and Greenfield would reunite in the late 1970s for Sedaka's Elektra Records albums; only one of these collaborations, "Should've Never Let You Go," was a hit, reaching the top 40 as a duet between Sedaka and his daughter Dara.

== Personal life ==
Greenfield was openly gay and was in a domestic partnership with cabaret singer Tory Damon (September 29, 1939 – March 30, 1986) from the early 1960s until his death; the two lived together in an apartment on East 63rd Street in Manhattan before moving to California in 1966.

== Death and legacy ==
Greenfield died in Los Angeles in 1986 from complications from AIDS, eleven days before his 50th birthday. He was interred at Forest Lawn Memorial Park (Hollywood Hills). Damon died from AIDS complications a few weeks later and is buried next to Greenfield.

In 1991, Greenfield was inducted into the Songwriters Hall of Fame.

== Songs ==
- "Alice in Wonderland"
- "Another Sleepless Night" (Edited By Blas Vallejo)
- "As Long As I Live" (Edited by Blas Vallejo)
- "A Woman is a Sentimental Thing"
- "Baby Roo"
- "Bad Girl" (Edited by Blas Vallejo)
- "Bewitched" (theme from ABC TV sitcom starring Elizabeth Montgomery)
- "Birds Do It"
- "Bouncin' All Over The World" (from Harlem Globetrotters animated cartoon show)
- "Breakin' in a Brand New Broken Heart"
- "Breaking Up Is Hard to Do"
- "Calendar Girl"
- "Call Me Crazy"
- "Candy Heart"
- "Circulate"
- "Counting Teardrops"
- "Cry a Little Sometimes"
- "Crying in the Rain"
- "Does Goodnight Mean Goodbye?"
- "Don't Hide Your Love"
- "Don't Read the Letter I Wrote You"
- "Eternity"
- "Everybody's Somebody's Fool"
- "Falling"
- "Find Yourself a Rainbow"
- "Foolish Little Girl"
- "Funny Thing About Time"
- "Get Rid of Him"
- "Happy Birthday Sweet Sixteen"
- "Hazel" ("Theme for the Hazel TV Show" second theme, season 4)
- "Heartache Named Johnny"
- "High School Girl"
- "I Found My World in You"
- "I Go Ape"
- "I Gotta Find Her"
- "I Must Be Dreaming" (Edited by Blas Vallejo)
- "I'm Not the Marrying Kind"
- "I Think It's Gonna Rain"
- "I Wish I'd Never Been Born"
- "(Is This the Way to) Amarillo"
- "It Hurts to Be in Love"
- "King of Clowns" (Edited by Blas Vallejo)
- "King of the Mountain"
- "Let's Go Steady Again"
- "Let's Go to the Movies"
- "Little Devil"
- "Love Me Like A Baby"
- "Love Will Keep Us Together"
- "Lovey Kravezit"
- "Lucky in Love with You"
- "My Heart Has a Mind of Its Own"
- "Next Door to an Angel"
- "Nobody's Asking Questions (But Everyone Wants To Know)"
- "Oh! Carol"
- "One Day of Your Life"
- "Our Last Song Together"
- "Passing Time"
- "Poor Little Puppet"
- "Puppet Man"
- "Put Yourself in My Place"
- "Rainy Day Bells"
- "Ring a Rockin' " (Edited by Blas Vallejo)
- "Run, Samson, Run"
- "She'll Never Be You"
- "Since You've Been Gone"
- "Sing Me"
- "Stairway to Heaven"
- "Standing in The Ruins (Of Our Old Love Affair)"
- "Stranger in The World"
- "Stupid Cupid"
- "Summer Symphony"
- "Sunny" (Edited by Blas Vallejo)
- "The Diary"
- "The Doll House Is Empty"
- "The Hungry Years"
- "The Other Side of Me"
- "The Same Old Fool"
- "Two Less Lonely People in the World"
- "Venus in Blue Jeans"
- "(Wait Till You See) My Gidget"
- "Walking in the Footsteps of a Fool"
- "Warpaint"
- "What Am I Gonna Do"
- "When the Boys Meet the Girls"
- "When Somebody Loves You"
- "Where the Boys Are"
- "Who Needs Forever"
- "You Gotta Make Your Own Sunshine"
- "You've Got To Learn Your Rhythm & Blues" (Edited by Blas Vallejo)
- "You Mean Everything to Me"
- "You Never Done It Like That"
- "Your Used to Be"
- "Tillie the Twirler"

== See also ==
- Inductees of the Songwriters Hall of Fame
- Aldon Music
- List of HIV-positive people

== Quotation ==
After Howie's mother Ella had seen me, he came ringing my doorbell. I was playing Chopin, and he said, My mother heard you play and thought we could write a song together".

— Neil Sedaka, in Goldmine magazine, recalling this event.
