= Al Nevins =

American musician (1915–1965)

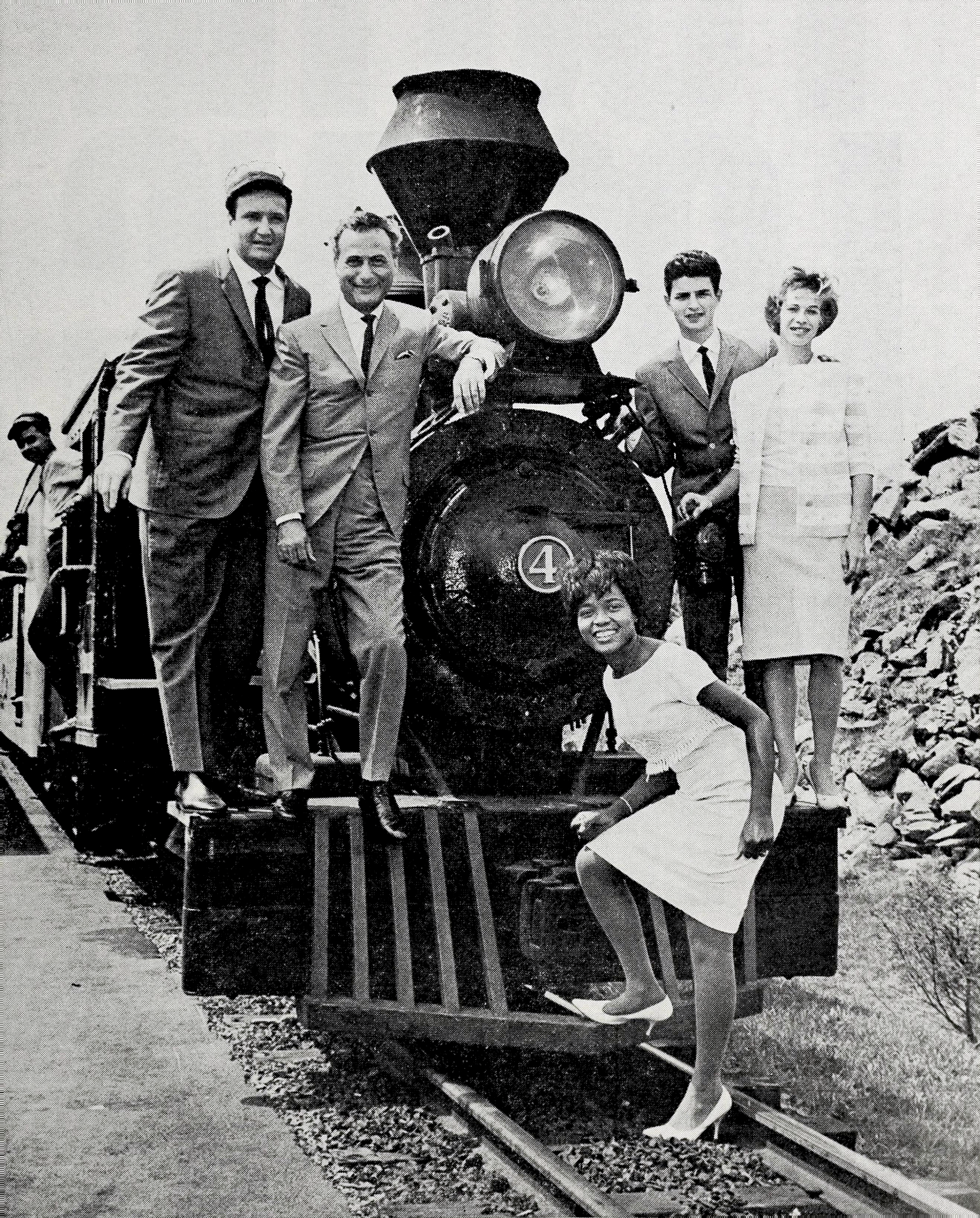
- Nevins, second from left, in a 1962 Dimension Records promotional photo

Background information
- Born: Albert Tepper; May 3, 1915; Washington, D.C., United States
- Died: January 25, 1965 (aged 49) New York City, United States
- Occupations: Songwriter; publisher; music producer; musician
- Years active: 1940s–1965
- Formerly of: The Three Suns

Albert Nevins (born Albert Tepper; May 3, 1915 – January 25, 1965) was an American musician, producer, arranger, guitarist and violinist. He was also a member of pop trio The Three Suns, and is considered one of the major forces behind the evolution of the 1950s music into the early 1960s pop/rock music.

== The Three Suns ==
Al Nevins was born in Washington, D.C. in 1915. In 1939, in partnership with his brother, accordionist Morty Nevins and his cousin, organist Artie Dunn, he founded The Three Suns. The band was signed to RCA Victor.

Al Nevins' song "Twilight Time" (co-written with Morty Nevins and Buck Ram) made it to the American Top 20. (The song was covered by The Platters, who were managed by Ram, and their version sold more than 4 million copies.) It was followed by a very successful cover of "Peg o' My Heart", which became one of the best-selling records of 1947 in the United States, staying for 16 weeks on the US Billboard chart, and peaking at #2.

In 1954, Al Nevins left the band due to ill health, to be replaced on Three Suns recordings by George Barnes, Johnny Buck (aka Bucky Pizzarelli), and later by Joe Negri.

== Solo career ==
He continued solo, recording three albums: Escapade in Sound, Lights and Shadows and Dancing with the Blues, the last arranged by Charles Albertine. Some releases were under the name Al Nevins and Orchestra.

== Aldon Music: publishing and producing ==
In 1958, he met the young songwriter Don Kirshner and they partnered for a publishing company that would specialize in music aimed at young listeners. The Platters' revival of Nevins' hit "Twilight Time," helped. The publishing company entitled Aldon Music became hugely successful with Nevins' business acumen and experience as a producer and arranger, and Kirshner's keen ability for discovering talented songwriters and performers, as well as the industry contacts he doggedly pursued. Aldon Music had under contract at various times several of the most important songwriters of the so-called "Brill Building" school, including Carole King, Gerry Goffin, Neil Sedaka, Howard Greenfield, Barry Mann, Cynthia Weil and Jack Keller. As a producer-promoter, Kirshner was influential in starting off the career of singers and songwriters including Bobby Darin, Neil Diamond, and Carole King.

Kirshner and Nevins began working as producers as well as publishers, with Aldon not just offering songs, but also recording finished recordings to the labels, which gave them a share of artist royalties as well as the standard publisher's share of the revenue from songs.

At the height of his success, Nevins suffered a heart attack and had relinquished his position by the early 1960s, but he continued to exert a powerful indirect influence at Aldon Music in his choice of arrangers, including the addition of Marty Gold and Sid Ramin.

In 1963, Aldon Music and the rest of Kirshner's ventures were sold to Columbia Pictures, and Kirshner became the head of the studio's newly enlarged record division, while Nevins stayed on as a consultant to the new operation.

The company's record of successes included more than 200 songs in the Top 40 charts in the space of five years.

== Death ==
Al Nevins died on January 25, 1965, in New York City, at the age of 49.
