= Musical short =

Short films featuring music

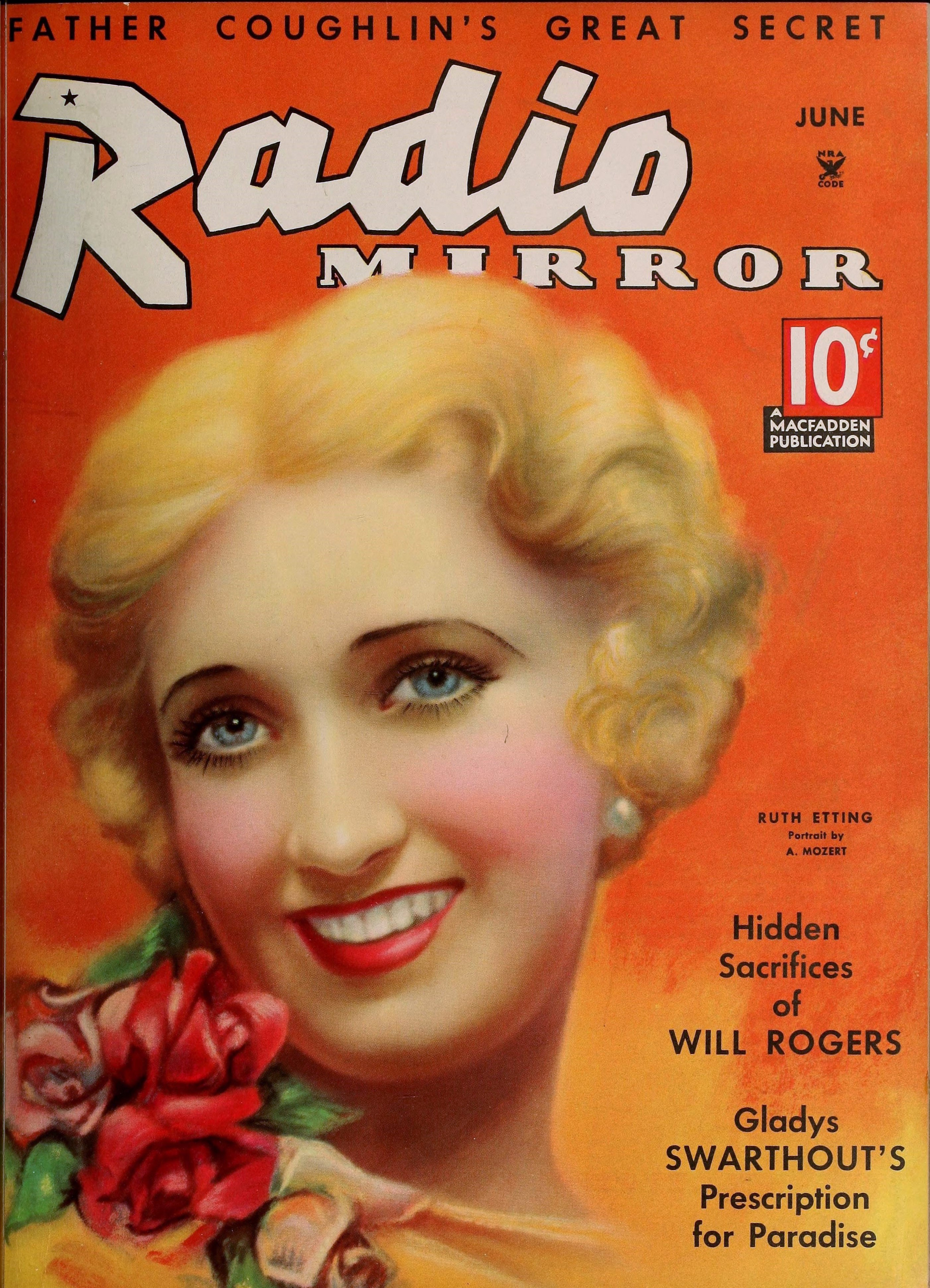
Ruth Etting sang "My Mother's Eyes" and "That's Him Now" in Ruth Etting in Favorite Melodies (Radio Mirror).

A musical short, also known as a musical short film or musical featurette, is a short film that features musical performances, often with little to no surrounding narrative. It can be traced back to the earliest days of sound films, reaching its maximum popularity in the 1940s, with musical shorts produced for soundies, precursors to music videos played on coin-operated video machines in thousands of bars, restaurants, and other public venues.

== History ==
The history of the musical short can be traced back to the earliest days of sound films.

Performers in the Lee de Forest Phonofilms of 1923-24 included Eddie Cantor, George Jessel, Abbie Mitchell ("The Colored Prima Donna") and comic singer-dancer Molly Picon, plus the team of Noble Sissel and Eubie Blake. The husband-and-wife vaudeville team of Eva Puck and Sammy White (billed as Puck and White) starred in the Phonofilm Opera vs. Jazz (1923). Max Fleischer used the Phonofilm process in 1924 when he introduced his animated Song Car-Tunes series.

=== Vitaphone ===
The nearly 2,000 Vitaphone short subjects produced by Warner Bros. and its sister studio First National from 1926 to 1930 included vaudevillians, opera singers, Broadway stars, dancers, bands and popular vocalists. One- and two-reel short musical films were valuable to the movie studios as springboards for new talents. Performers who made their film debuts in short films include Joan Blondell, Humphrey Bogart, Burns and Allen, Sammy Davis Jr., Judy Garland (as Baby Gumm), Cary Grant, Bob Hope, Bert Lahr and Ginger Rogers.

Ruth Etting sang "My Mother's Eyes" (by Abel Baer and L. Wolfe Gilbert) and "That's Him Now" (by Milton Ager and Jack Yellen) in the Paramount Movietone Ruth Etting in Favorite Melodies (1929), filmed in a single take at the Astoria Studios in Queens, New York. Astoria Studios was built by Paramount in the early days of sound films to provide the company with an audio-capable facility close to the Broadway theater district. Many features and short subjects were filmed there between 1928 and 1933, including the 16-minute St. Louis Blues (1929), the only film of Bessie Smith.

=== 1930s ===
Orchestra leader Phil Spitalny made a series of musical shorts beginning with Phil Spitalny (1929) at MGM, followed by shorts for both Vitaphone and Paramount, including Big City Fantasy (1929), Phil Spitalny and His Musical Queens (1934), Ladies That Play (1934), Phil Spitalny and His All Girl Orchestra (1935) and Sirens of Syncopation (1935).

For promotional purposes, major film stars, including Gary Cooper and Clark Gable, made guest appearances in such musical shorts as MGM's Star Night at the Cocoanut Grove (1934) and Starlit Days at the Lido (1935), while others featured a single band, such as Freddie Rich and His Orchestra (1938).

Richard Barrios (author of A Song in the Dark: The Birth of the Musical Film) provided notes for Kino Video's compilation, The Best of Big Bands and Swing:

During the "Dawn of Sound," musical short subjects were the hors d'œuvre before the main feature, and an effective means for the studio to test their freshly signed talent in front of the camera. Aggressively pursuing the top singers, songwriters and musicians of Tin Pan Alley, Paramount's roster of contract players was composed of some of the top names in the world of entertainment. Cary Grant makes his film debut as a sailor cruising the Far East in search of whoopee in Singapore Sue. Artie Shaw presents a master class in the elementals of swingband construction (Artie Shaw's Class In Swing). A very young Bing Crosby croons three ballads in Dream House, a comedy-musical directed by slapstick impresario Mack Sennett. This collection showcases several top female vocalists, including Ethel Merman (Her Future), Ruth Etting (Favorite Melodies and Lillian Roth (Meet The Boyfriend). There's also a two-edged homage to that icon of 1930s naughtiness, Betty Boop, with appearances by Betty's prototype, "Boop-a-Doop Girl" Helen Kane (A Lesson In Love), and Betty's actual voice, Mae Questel (Musical Doctor, in which Dr. Rudy Vallee finds musical deficiencies to be the root of all ills). Perhaps the gem of this collection, however, is Office Blues, in which a pre-Astaire and pre-stardom Ginger Rogers cavorts with Broadway chorines in an Art Deco extravaganza. With artists like these on the bill it's clear that the short subject -- not the feature -- was often the highlight of the program!

=== 1940s ===
Vincent Lopez and Betty Hutton in 1939.

In the late 1930s and early 1940s, Betty Hutton made a half-dozen musical shorts before her feature debut in The Fleet's In (1942) and then continued to make shorts for the war effort. She was seen in Paramount Headliner: Queens of the Air (1938), Vitaphone's Vincent Lopez and His Orchestra (1939), Broadway Brevities: One for the Book (1939), Paramount Headliner: Three Kings and a Queen (1939), Broadway Brevities: Public Jitterbug Number One (1939), Paramount Victory Short No. T2-1: A Letter from Bataan (1942), Army-Navy Screen Magazine #20: Strictly G.I. (1943), Paramount's Skirmish on the Home Front (1944) and Hollywood Victory Caravan (1945), produced on the Paramount lot by the Treasury Department for the 1945 Victory Loan Drive. Several of Hutton's musical shorts have been shown on Turner Classic Movies in recent years.

Modern jazz was added to the mix in such films as the 16-minute Artistry in Rhytym (1944), with Stan Kenton and Anita O'Day, later re-edited into another short, Cool and Groovy (1956), which also featured Chico Hamilton and The Hi-Los.

==== Soundies ====
In the mid-1940s, Louis Jordan, Dorothy Dandridge, the Nicholas Brothers, and many others made short music films known as soundies. Some of Jordan's were spliced together into a feature-length musical Western, Look-Out Sister (1947).

Soundies were the precursors to the late 20th century on music video, the most contemporary evolution of the musical short.

== Television ==
During the 1950s, musical shorts were revived for telecasting on local stations. Feature films in that decade were usually not edited to fit. Instead, if a feature ended 20 minutes before the hour, footage from musical shorts was used to fill the gap.

Snader Telescriptions were musical shorts made for television from 1950 to 1954. There were thousands of these three- and four-minute films, covering various genres from jazz and pop to R&B and country. Louis "Duke" Goldstone directed for Louis D. Snader.

== See also ==
- Dance in film
- List of big bands
- List of musical films by year
- Music video
- Musical films
- Scopitone
- Soundies
