= Video Jukebox =

Video Jukebox may refer to:

- Video Jukebox, an American television program that aired from 1978 to 1986 on Home Box Office (HBO).
- Video Jukebox Network, a cable, satellite and UHF broadcast Florida television service.
- YouTube Jukebox, a free service for creating playlists of YouTube videos, especially music.

As a general term in English, video jukebox may refer to:

- A device for playing music in a bar, etc. equipped with an electronic screen for selection and display.
- A video playback system connected to a telecommunication network in order to transmit films to consumers on demand.
- The presentation of videos in a media player on a website, along the lines of YouTube.
- In slang: any small electronic device that can record and play back music, such as an iPod.
- The Scopitone, a jukebox which played 16mm films.
