= Music video =

Video featuring a performance of a song

A music video is a motion picture that integrates a song or an album with imagery that is produced for promotional or musical artistic purposes. Modern music videos are primarily made and used as a music marketing device intended to promote the sale of music recordings. These videos are typically shown on music television and on streaming video sites like YouTube, or more rarely shown theatrically. They can be commercially issued on home video, either as video albums or video singles. The format has been described by various terms including "illustrated song", "filmed insert", "promotional (promo) film", "promotional clip", "promotional video", "song video", "song clip", "film clip", "video clip", or simply "video".

While musical short films were popular as soon as recorded sound was introduced to theatrical film screenings in the 1920s, promotional music videos started becoming popular into the 1960s and the music video rose to prominence in the 1980s when American TV channel MTV based its format around the medium.

Music videos use a wide range of styles and contemporary video-making techniques, including animation, live-action, documentary, and non-narrative approaches such as abstract film. Combining these styles and techniques has become more popular due to the variety for the audience. Many music videos interpret images and scenes from the song's lyrics, while others take a more thematic approach. Other music videos may not have any concept, being only a filmed version of the song's live concert performance.

== History and development ==
In 1894, sheet music publishers Edward B. Marks and Joe Stern hired electrician George Thomas and various artists to promote sales of their song "The Little Lost Child". Using a magic lantern, Thomas projected a series of still images on a screen simultaneous to live performances. This would become a popular form of entertainment known as the illustrated song, which can be regarded as a predecessor of the music video.

=== Talkies, soundies and shorts ===
With the arrival of "talkies" many musical short films were produced. Vitaphone shorts (produced by Warner Bros. Pictures) featured many bands, vocalists, and dancers. Animation artist Max Fleischer introduced a series of sing-along short cartoons called Screen Songs, which invited audiences to sing along to popular songs by "following the bouncing ball", which is similar to a modern karaoke machine. Early cartoons featured popular musicians performing their hit songs on camera in live-action segments during the cartoons. John Logie Baird created Phonovision discs featuring Betty Bolton and other singers from the 1930s. The early animated films by Walt Disney, such as the Silly Symphonies shorts and especially Fantasia, which featured several interpretations of classical pieces, were built around music. The Warner Bros. cartoons, even today billed as Looney Tunes and Merrie Melodies, were initially fashioned around specific songs from upcoming Warner Bros. musical films. Live-action musical shorts, featuring such popular music artists as Cab Calloway, were also distributed to theaters.

Blues singer Bessie Smith appeared in a two-reel short film called St. Louis Blues (1929) featuring a dramatized performance of the hit song. Numerous other musicians appeared in short musical subjects during this period.

Soundies, produced and released for the Panoram film jukebox between 1939 and 1947, were musical films that often included short dance sequences, similar to later music videos.

Musician Louis Jordan made short films for his songs, some of which were spliced together into a feature film, Look-Out Sister (1948). These films were, according to music historian Donald Clarke, the "ancestors" of music video.

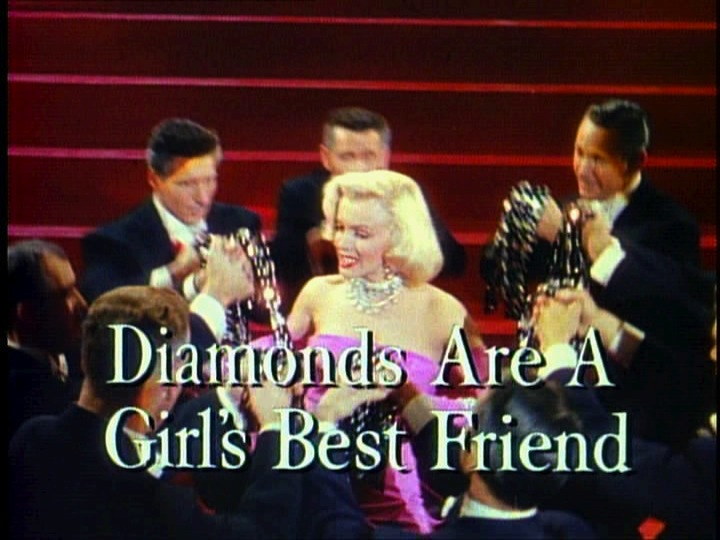
Musicals of the 1950s led to short-form music videos.

Musical films were another important precursor to a music video, and several well-known music videos have imitated the style of classic Hollywood musicals from the 1930s–50s. One of the best-known examples is Madonna's 1985 video for "Material Girl" (directed by Mary Lambert) which was closely modelled on Jack Cole's staging of "Diamonds Are a Girl's Best Friend" from the film Gentlemen Prefer Blondes (1953). Several of Michael Jackson's videos show the unmistakable influence of the dance sequences in classic Hollywood musicals, including the landmark "Thriller" (1983), and the Martin Scorsese–directed "Bad" (1987), which was influenced by the stylized dance "fights" in the film version of West Side Story (1961). According to the Internet Accuracy Project, DJ/singer J. P. "The Big Bopper" Richardson was the first to coin the phrase "music video", in 1959.

In his autobiography, Tony Bennett claims to have created "...the first music video" when he was filmed walking along the Serpentine in Hyde Park, London, with the resulting clip being set to his 1953 recording of the song "Stranger in Paradise". The clip was sent to UK and US television stations and aired on shows including Dick Clark's American Bandstand. The oldest example of a promotional music video with similarities to more abstract, modern videos seems to be the Czechoslovak "Dáme si do bytu" ("We´ll put in the apartment") created and directed by Ladislav Rychman in 1958.

=== Beginnings of popular music television and promotional clips: late 1950s–1973 ===
In the late 1950s the Scopitone, a visual jukebox, was introduced in France and short films were produced by many French artists, such as Serge Gainsbourg, Françoise Hardy, Jacques Dutronc, and the Belgian Jacques Brel to accompany their songs. Its use spread to other countries, and similar machines such as the Cinebox in Italy and Color-sonic in the U.S. were patented. In 1961, for the Canadian-produced show Singalong Jubilee, Manny Pittson began pre-recording the music audio, went on-location and taped various visuals with the musicians lip-synching, then edited the audio and video together. Most music numbers were taped in-studio on stage, and the location shoot "videos" were to add variety. In 1964, Kenneth Anger's experimental short film, Scorpio Rising used popular songs instead of dialogue.

On 1 January 1964, Johnnie Stewart and Stanley Dorfman created the British chart music television series Top of the Pops, which they produced in tandem and directed in weekly rotation until the 1970s. The show's format created a demand for frequent studio appearances by renowned British and US artists at short notice, as the charts came out on Tuesday mornings and the show was taped live on Thursdays. Coupled with the artists busy touring schedules and subsequent requests from broadcasters in Europe and America to showcase popular British acts, ultimately prompted the production of pre-recorded or filmed inserts referred to as "promotional videos." These videos served as substitutes for live performances by the artists and played a pivotal role in the development of the music video genre. During the early stages of the show's introduction in 1964, when alternative footage was unavailable, Dorfman and Stewart resorted to capturing footage of the enthusiastic audience dancing. However, a significant change took place in October 1964 when a decision was made to occasionally introduce a dance troupe with choreographed routines for specific tracks. This addition brought a new dynamic to the show, enhancing its visual appeal and diversifying the entertainment value for viewers. One notable example was the video for Roy Orbison's song 'Oh Pretty Woman', which Dorfman filmed and directed in the rooftop garden of London's Kensington-based Derry and Toms department store on 19 October 1964 as a visual accompaniment to the song. It subsequently aired on Top of the Pops on 22 October, 29, as well as 12 November and 19." By the 1970s, Top of the Pops had an average weekly viewership of 12,500,000 people, had solidified its status as the premier international platform for artists launching new records at the time, had firmly established the significance of promotional film clips as a crucial tool for promoting the careers of emerging artists and generating buzz for new releases by established acts, and was significant in developing and popularizing what would later become the music video genre across the globe.

In 1964, The Moody Blues producer Alex Murray wanted to promote his version of "Go Now". The short film clip he produced and directed to promote the single has a striking visual style that predates Queen's similar "Bohemian Rhapsody" video by a full decade. It also predates what the Beatles did with promotional films of their single "Paperback Writer" and B-Side "Rain", both released in 1966.

Also in 1964, the Beatles starred in their first feature film, A Hard Day's Night, directed by US filmmaker Richard Lester. Shot in black-and-white and presented as a mock documentary, it interspersed comedic and dialogue sequences with musical tones. The musical sequences furnished basic templates on which numerous subsequent music videos were modeled. It was the direct model for the successful American TV series The Monkees (1966–1968), which was similarly composed of film segments that were created to accompany various Monkees songs. The Beatles' second feature, Help! (1965), was a much more lavish affair, filmed in color in London and on international locations. The title track sequence, filmed in black-and-white, is arguably one of the prime archetypes of the modern performance-style music video, employing rhythmic cross-cutting, contrasting long shots and close-ups, and infrequent shots and camera angles, such as the shot 50 seconds into the song, in which George Harrison's left hand and the neck of his guitar are seen in sharp focus in the foreground while the completely out-of-focus figure of John Lennon sings in the background.

In 1965, the Beatles started making promotional clips (then known as "filmed inserts") for distribution and broadcast on Top of the Pops and in different countries—primarily the U.S.—so they could promote their record releases without having to make in-person appearances. Their first batch of promo films shot in late 1965 (including their then-current single, "Day Tripper"/"We Can Work It Out"), were fairly straightforward mimed-in-studio performance pieces (albeit sometimes in silly sets) and meant to blend in fairly seamlessly with television shows like Top of the Pops and Hullabaloo. By the time the Beatles stopped touring in late 1966, their promotional films, like their recordings, had become highly sophisticated. In May 1966, they filmed two sets of colour promotional clips for their current single "Rain"/"Paperback Writer" all directed by Michael Lindsay-Hogg, who went on to direct The Rolling Stones Rock and Roll Circus and the Beatles' final film, Let It Be. It aired on Top of the Pops on 2 June. The colour promotional clips for "Strawberry Fields Forever" and "Penny Lane", made in early 1967 and directed by Peter Goldman, took the promotional film format to a new level. They used techniques borrowed from underground and avant-garde film, including reversed film and slow motion, dramatic lighting, unusual camera angles, and colour filtering added in post-production. At the end of 1967 the group released their third film, the one hour, made-for-television project Magical Mystery Tour; it was written and directed by the group and first broadcast on the BBC on Boxing Day 1967. Although poorly received at the time for lacking a narrative structure, it showed the group to be adventurous music filmmakers in their own right.

Concert films were being released in the mid-1960s, at least as early as 1964, with the T.A.M.I. Show.

The monochrome 1965 clip for Bob Dylan's "Subterranean Homesick Blues" filmed by D. A. Pennebaker was featured in Pennebaker's Dylan film documentary Dont Look Back. Eschewing any attempt to simulate performance or present a narrative, the clip shows Dylan standing in a city back alley, silently shuffling a series of large cue cards (bearing key words from the song's lyrics).

Besides the Beatles, many other British artists made "filmed inserts" so they could be screened on TV when the bands were not available to appear live. The Who featured in several promotional clips, beginning with their 1965 clip for "I Can't Explain". Their plot clip for "Happy Jack" (1966) shows the band acting like a gang of thieves. The promo film to "Call Me Lightning" (1968) tells a story of how drummer Keith Moon came to join the group: The other three band members are having tea inside what looks like an abandoned hangar when suddenly a "bleeding box" arrives, out of which jumps a fast-running, time lapse, Moon that the other members subsequently try to get a hold of in a sped-up slapstick chasing sequence to wind him down. Pink Floyd produced promotional films for their songs, including "San Francisco: Film", directed by Anthony Stern, "Scarecrow", "Arnold Layne" and "Interstellar Overdrive", the latter directed by Peter Whitehead, who also made several pioneering clips for The Rolling Stones between 1966 and 1968. The Kinks made one of the first "plot" promotional clips for a song. For their single "Dead End Street" (1966) a miniature comic movie was made. The BBC reportedly refused to air the clip because it was considered to be in "poor taste".

The Rolling Stones appeared in many promotional clips for their songs in the 1960s. In 1966, Peter Whitehead directed two promo clips for their single "Have You Seen Your Mother, Baby, Standing In The Shadow?" In 1967, Whitehead directed a plot clip colour promo clip for the Stones single "We Love You", which first aired in August 1967. This clip featured sped-up footage of the group recording in the studio, intercut with a mock trial that clearly alludes to the drug prosecutions of Mick Jagger and Keith Richards underway at that time. Jagger's girlfriend Marianne Faithfull appears in the trial scenes and presents the "judge" (Richards) with what may be the infamous fur rug that had featured so prominently in the press reports of the drug bust at Richards' house in early 1967. When it is pulled back, it reveals an apparently naked Jagger with chains around his ankles. The clip concludes with scenes of the Stones in the studio intercut with footage that had previously been used in the "concert version" promo clip for "Have You Seen Your Mother, Baby". The group also filmed a color promo clip for the song "2000 Light Years from Home" (from their album Their Satanic Majesties Request) directed by Michael Lindsay-Hogg. In 1968, Michael Lindsay-Hogg directed three clips for their single "Jumpin' Jack Flash" / "Child of the Moon"—a color clip for "Child of the Moon" and two different clips for "Jumpin' Jack Flash". In 1968, they collaborated with Jean-Luc Godard on the film Sympathy for the Devil, which mixed Godard's politics with documentary footage of the song's evolution during recording sessions.

In 1966, Nancy Sinatra filmed a clip for her song "These Boots Are Made for Walkin'". Roy Orbison appeared in promotional clips, such as his 1968 hit, "Walk On".

During late 1972–73, Alice Cooper featured in a series of promotional films: "Elected", "Hello Hooray", "No More Mr. Nice Guy" and "Teenage Lament '74". Also during late 1972–73, David Bowie featured in a series of promotional films directed by pop photographer Mick Rock, who worked extensively with Bowie in this period. Rock directed and edited four clips to promote four consecutive David Bowie singles—"John, I'm Only Dancing" (May 1972), "The Jean Genie" (November 1972), the December 1972 US re-release of "Space Oddity" and the 1973 release of the single "Life on Mars?" (lifted from Bowie's earlier album Hunky Dory). The clip for "John, I'm Only Dancing" was made with a budget of just US$200 and filmed at the afternoon rehearsal for Bowie's Rainbow Theatre concert on August 19, 1972. It shows Bowie and band mimicking to the record intercut with footage of the Lindsay Kemp mime troupe, dancing on stage and behind a back-lit screen. The clip was turned down by the BBC, who reportedly found the homosexual overtones of the film distasteful; accordingly, Top of the Pops replaced it with footage of bikers and a dancer. The "Jean Genie" clip, produced for just US$350, was shot in one day and edited in less than two days. It intercuts footage of Bowie and band in concert with contrasting footage of the group in a photographic studio, wearing black stage outfits, and standing against a white background. It also includes location footage with Bowie and Cyrinda Foxe (a MainMan employee and a friend of David and Angie Bowie) shot in San Francisco outside the famous Mars Hotel, with Fox posing provocatively in the street while Bowie lounges against the wall, smoking.

Country music also picked up on the trend of promotional film clips to publicize songs. Sam Lovullo, the producer of the television series Hee Haw, explained his show presented "what were, in reality, the first musical videos", while JMI Records made the same claim with Don Williams' 1973 song "The Shelter of Your Eyes". Country music historian Bob Millard wrote that JMI had pioneered the country music video concept by "producing a 3-minute film" to go along with Williams' song. Lovullo said his videos were conceptualized by having the show's staff go to nearby rural areas and film animals and farmers, before editing the footage to fit the storyline of a particular song. "The video material was a very workable production item for the show," he wrote. "It provided picture stories for songs. However, some of our guests felt the videos took attention away from their live performances, which they hoped would promote record sales. If they had a hit song, they didn't want to play it under comic barnyard footage." The concept's mixed reaction eventually spelled an end to the "video" concept on Hee Haw. Promotional films of country music songs, however, continued to be produced.

In 1974, the band Sparks made a promotional video for their song "This Town Ain't Big Enough for Both of Us".

=== 1974–1980 ===
The Australian TV shows Countdown and Sounds, both of which premiered in 1974, followed in the steps of the UK's Top of the Pops and were significant in developing and popularizing what would later become the music video genre in Australia and other countries, and in establishing the importance of promotional film clips as a means of promoting both emerging acts and new releases by established acts. In early 1974, former radio DJ Graham Webb launched a weekly teen-oriented TV music show which screened on Sydney's ATN-7 on Saturday mornings; this was renamed Sounds Unlimited in 1975 and later shortened simply to Sounds. In need of material for the show, Webb approached Seven newsroom staffer Russell Mulcahy and asked him to shoot film footage to accompany popular songs for which there were no purpose-made clips (e.g. Harry Nilsson's "Everybody's Talkin"). Using this method, Webb and Mulcahy assembled a collection of about 25 clips for the show. The success of his early efforts encouraged Mulcahy to quit his TV job and become a full-time director, and he made clips for several popular Australian acts including Stylus, Marcia Hines, Hush and AC/DC. As it gained popularity, Countdown talent coordinator Molly Meldrum and producer Michael Shrimpton quickly realized that "film clips" were becoming an important new commodity in music marketing. Despite the show's minuscule budget, Countdown's original director Paul Drane was able to create several memorable music videos especially for the show, including the classic film-clips for the AC/DC hits "It's a Long Way to the Top (If You Wanna Rock 'n' Roll)" and "Jailbreak". After relocating to the UK in the mid-1970s, Mulcahy made successful promo films for several noted British pop acts—his early UK credits included XTC's "Making Plans for Nigel" (1979) and his landmark video clip for The Buggles' "Video Killed the Radio Star" (1979), which became the first music video played on MTV in 1981.

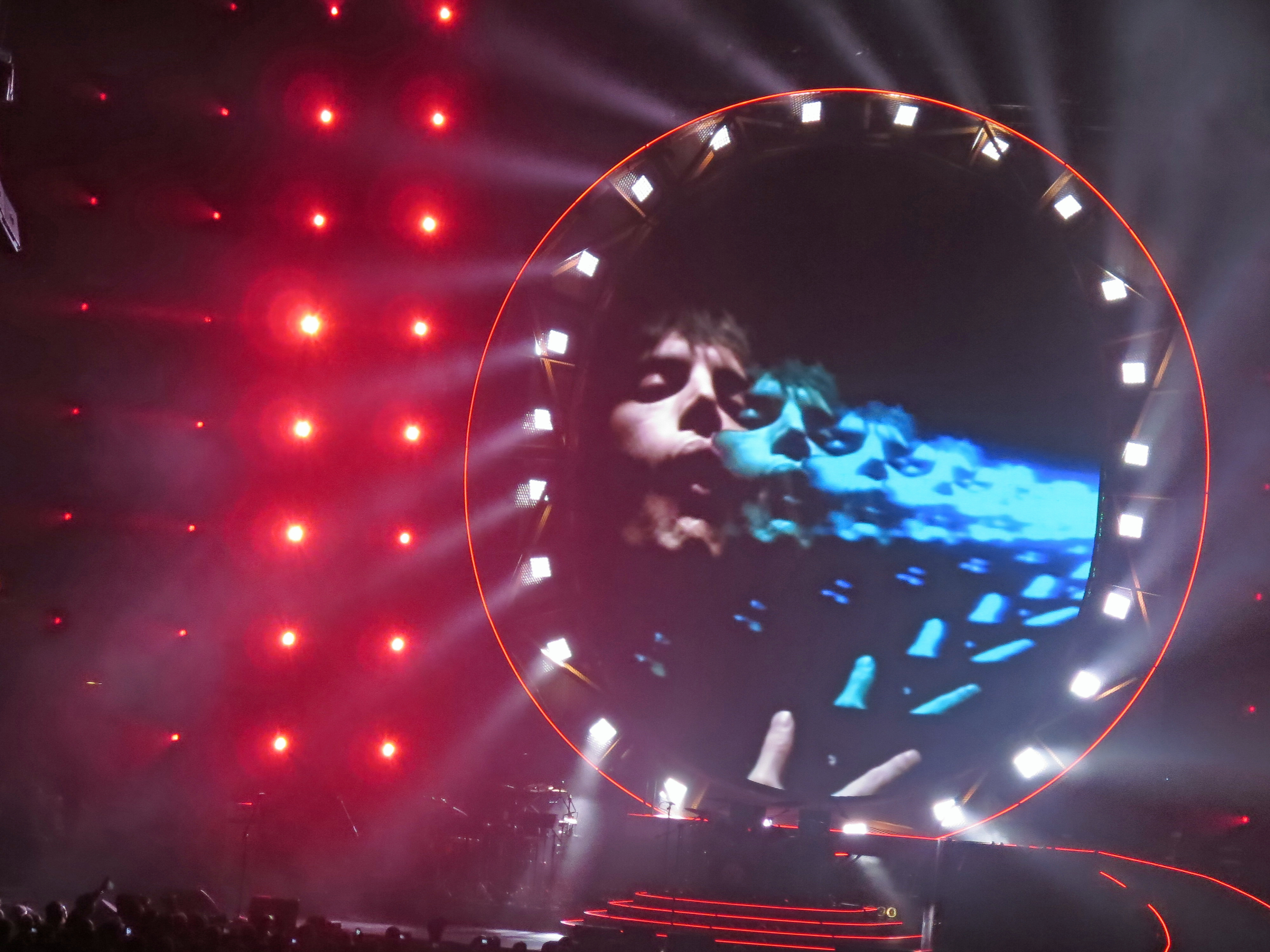
Footage of Freddie Mercury in the "Bohemian Rhapsody" music video during a Queen + Adam Lambert concert at the United Center, Chicago

In 1975, Queen employed Bruce Gowers to make a promotional video to show their new single "Bohemian Rhapsody" on the BBC music series Top of the Pops. According to rock historian Paul Fowles, the song is "widely credited as the first global hit single for which an accompanying video was central to the marketing strategy". Rolling Stone has said of "Bohemian Rhapsody": "Its influence cannot be overstated, practically inventing the music video seven [sic] years before MTV went on the air."

At the end of the 1970s, the broadcasting of music videos on television became more and more regular, in several countries. The music videos were, for example, broadcast in weekly music programs or inserted into various programs. In the United States, for example, on terrestrial networks at the end of the 1970s, music videos were sometimes broadcast on music shows: The Midnight Special, Don Kirshner's Rock Concert, and occasionally on certain talk shows.

A worldwide pioneer in programs that only transmitted rock and pop music video clips was the Peruvian program Disco Club, hosted by the Peruvian musician Gerardo Manuel, which began its transmission on the Peruvian state channel (Channel 7 of Lima, Peru in free-to-air TV) in June 1978, three years before the appearance of MTV. Initially, it was only broadcast on Saturdays at 7 p.m., but due to acceptance, in November of that same year it began to be broadcast every day.

Video Concert Hall, created by Jerry Crowe and Charles Henderson and launched on November 1, 1979, was the first nationwide video music programming on American cable television, predating MTV by almost two years. The USA Cable Network program Night Flight was one of the first American programs to showcase these videos as an art form.

In 1980, the music video to David Bowie's "Ashes to Ashes" became the most expensive ever made, having a production cost of $582,000 (equivalent to $2.27 million in 2025), the first music video to have a production cost of over $500,000. The video was made in solarized color with stark black-and-white scenes and was filmed in different locations, including a padded room and a rocky shore. The video became one of the most iconic ever made at the time, and its complex nature is seen as significant in the evolution of the music video.

The same year, New Zealander group Split Enz had major success with the single "I Got You" and the album True Colours, and later that year they produced a complete set of promo clips for each song on the album (directed by their percussionist, Noel Crombie) and to market these on videocassette. This was followed a year later by the video album, The Completion Backward Principle by The Tubes, directed by the group's keyboard player, Michael Cotten, which included two videos directed by Russell Mulcahy ("Talk to Ya Later" and "Don't Want to Wait Anymore"). Among the first music videos were clips produced by ex-Monkee Michael Nesmith, who started making short musical films for Saturday Night Live. In 1981, he released Elephant Parts, the first winner of a Grammy for music video, directed by William Dear.

=== 1981–1991: Music videos go mainstream ===
In 1981, the American video channel MTV launched, airing "Video Killed the Radio Star" by The Buggles and beginning an era of 24/7 music on television. With this new outlet for material, the music video would, by the mid-1980s, grow to play a central role in popular music marketing. Many important acts of this period, most notably Michael Jackson, Adam and the Ants, Duran Duran and Madonna, owed a great deal of their success to the skillful construction and seductive appeal of their videos.

Two key innovations in the development of the modern music video were the development of relatively inexpensive and easy-to-use video recording and editing equipment, and the development of visual effects created with techniques such as image compositing. The advent of high-quality color videotape recorders and portable video cameras coincided with the DIY ethos of the new wave era, enabling many pop acts to produce promotional videos quickly and cheaply, in comparison to the relatively high costs of using film. However, as the genre developed, music video directors increasingly turned to 35mm film as the preferred medium, while others mixed film and video. During the 1980s, music videos had become de rigueur for most recording artists. The phenomenon was famously parodied by BBC television comedy program Not The Nine O'Clock News who produced a spoof music video "Nice Video, Shame About the Song" (the title was a spoof of a recent pop hit "Nice Legs, Shame About Her Face").

In this period, directors and the acts they worked with began to discover and expand the form and style of the genre, using more sophisticated effects in their videos, mixing film and video, and adding a storyline or plot to the music video. Occasionally videos were made in a non-representational form, in which the musical artist was not shown. Because music videos are mainly intended to promote the artist, such videos are comparatively rare; three early 1980s examples are Bruce Springsteen's "Atlantic City", directed by Arnold Levine, David Mallet's video for David Bowie and Queen's "Under Pressure", and Ian Emes' video for Duran Duran's "The Chauffeur". One notable later example of the non-representational style is Bill Konersman's innovative 1987 video for Prince's "Sign o' the Times" – influenced by Dylan's "Subterranean Homesick Blues" clip, it featured only the text of the song's lyrics.

In the early 1980s, music videos also began to discover political and social themes. Examples include the music videos for David Bowie's "China Girl" and "Let's Dance" (1983) which both discussed race issues. In a 1983 interview, Bowie spoke about the importance of using music videos in addressing social issues, "Let's try to use the video format as a platform for some kind of social observation, and not just waste it on trotting out and trying to enhance the public image of the singer involved".

In 1983, one of the most successful, influential and iconic music videos of all time was released: the nearly 14-minute-long video for Michael Jackson's song "Thriller", directed by John Landis. The video set new standards for production, having cost US $800,000 to film. The video for "Thriller", along with earlier videos by Jackson for his songs "Billie Jean" and "Beat It", were instrumental in getting music videos by African-American artists played on MTV. Prior to Jackson's success, videos by African-American artists were rarely played on MTV: according to MTV, this was because it initially conceived itself as a rock-music-oriented channel, although musician Rick James was outspoken in his criticism of the cable channel, claiming in 1983 that MTV's refusal to air the music video for his song "Super Freak" and clips by other African-American performers was "blatant racism". British rock singer David Bowie had also recently lashed out against MTV during an interview that he did with them prior to the release of "Thriller", stating that he was "floored" by how much MTV neglected black artists, bringing attention to how videos by the "few black artists that one does see" only appeared on MTV between 2:00 a.m. until 6:00 a.m. when nobody was watching.

MTV also influences music video shows aired on other American TV channels, such as: Friday Night Videos, launched in 1983 on the terrestrial network NBC and MV3 launched in 1982.

On March 5, 1983, Country Music Television (CMT), was launched, created and founded by Glenn D. Daniels and uplinked from the Video World Productions facility in Hendersonville, Tennessee. The MuchMusic video channel was launched in Canada in 1984. In 1984, MTV also launched the MTV Video Music Awards (later to be known as the VMAs), an annual awards event that would come to underscore MTV's importance in the music industry. The inaugural event rewarded the Beatles and David Bowie with the Video Vanguard Award for their work in pioneering the music video.

In 1985, MTV's Viacom (currently Paramount Skydance) launched the channel VH1 (then known as "VH-1: Video Hits One"), featuring softer music, and meant to cater to the slightly older baby-boomer demographic who were out-growing MTV. Internationally, MTV Europe was launched in 1987, and MTV Asia in 1991. Another important development in music videos was the launch of The Chart Show on the UK's Channel 4 in 1986. This was a program that composed entirely of music videos (the only outlet many videos had on British TV at the time), with no presenters. Instead, the videos were linked by then state of the art computer graphics. The show moved to ITV in 1989.

The video for the 1985 Dire Straits song "Money for Nothing" made pioneering use of computer animation, and helped make the song an international hit. The song itself was a wry comment on the music-video phenomenon, sung from the point of view of an appliance deliveryman both drawn to and repelled by the outlandish images and personalities that appeared on MTV. In 1986, Peter Gabriel's song "Sledgehammer" used special effects and animation techniques developed by British studio Aardman Animations. The video for "Sledgehammer" would go on to be a phenomenal success and win nine MTV Video Music Awards. In the same year, Kraftwerk released the song "Musique Non Stop". The video featured 3D animations of the group. It was a collaboration with Rebecca Allen of the New York Institute of Technology and ran continuously on MTV for a while.

In 1988, the show Yo! MTV Raps introduced; the show helped to bring hip-hop to a mass audience for the first time.

=== 1992–2004: Rise of the directors ===
In November 1992, MTV began screening videos made by Chris Cunningham, Michel Gondry, Spike Jonze, Floria Sigismondi, Stéphane Sednaoui, Mark Romanek and Hype Williams who all got their start around this time; all brought a unique vision and style to the videos they directed. Some of these directors, including, Gondry, Jonze, Sigismondi, and F. Gary Gray, went on to direct feature films. This continued a trend that had begun earlier with directors such as Lasse Hallström and David Fincher.

Two of the videos directed by Romanek in 1995 are notable for being two of the three most expensive music videos of all time: Michael and Janet Jackson's "Scream", which allegedly cost $7 million to produce, and Madonna's "Bedtime Story", which cost a reported $5 million. From this, "Scream" is the most expensive video to date. In the mid to late 1990s, Walter Stern directed "Firestarter" by The Prodigy, "Bitter Sweet Symphony" by The Verve, and "Teardrop" by Massive Attack.

During this period, MTV launched channels around the world to show music videos produced in each local market: MTV Latin America in 1993, MTV India in 1996, and MTV Mandarin in 1997, among others. MTV2, originally called "M2" and meant to show more alternative and older music videos, debuted in 1996.

In 1999, Mariah Carey's "Heartbreaker" (featuring guest rapper Jay-Z) became one of the most expensive ever made, costing over $2.5 million.

From 1991 to 2001, Billboard had its own Music Video Awards.

=== 2005–present: Music video downloads and streaming ===
A video promoting Spoon's album Spacey Boy and Sadness Girl

The website iFilm, which hosted short videos including music videos, launched in 1997. Napster, a peer-to-peer file sharing service which ran between 1999 and 2001, enabled users to share video files, including those for music videos. By the mid-2000s, MTV and many of its sister channels had largely abandoned showing music videos in favor of reality TV shows, which were more popular with its audiences, and which MTV had itself helped to pioneer with the show The Real World, which premiered in 1992.

2005 saw the launch of YouTube, which made the viewing of online video much faster and easier; Google Videos, Yahoo! Video, Facebook and Myspace's video functionality use similar technology. Such websites had a profound effect on the viewing of music videos; some artists began to see success as a result of videos seen mostly or entirely online. The band OK Go capitalized on the growing trend, having achieved fame through the videos for two of their songs, "A Million Ways" in 2005 and "Here It Goes Again" in 2006, both of which first became well-known online (OK Go repeated the trick with another high-concept video in 2010, for their song "This Too Shall Pass").

At its launch, Apple's iTunes Store provided a section of free music videos in high quality compression to be watched via the iTunes application. More recently the iTunes Store has begun selling music videos for use on Apple's iPod with video playback capability.

The 2008 video for Weezer's "Pork and Beans" also captured this trend, by including at least 20 YouTube celebrities; the single became the most successful of Weezer's career, in chart performance. In 2007, the RIAA issued cease-and-desist letters to YouTube users to prevent single users from sharing videos, which are the property of the music labels. After its merger with Google, YouTube assured the RIAA that they would find a way to pay royalties through a bulk agreement with the major record labels. This was complicated by the fact that not all labels share the same policy toward music videos: some welcome the development and upload music videos to various online outlets themselves, viewing music videos as free advertising for their artists, while other labels view music videos not as an advertisement, but as the product itself.

To further signify the change in direction towards Music Video airplay, MTV officially dropped the Music Television tagline on February 8, 2010 from their logo in response to their increased commitment to non-scripted reality programming and other youth-oriented entertainment rising in prominence on their live broadcast.

Vevo, a music video service launched by several major music publishers, debuted in December 2009. The videos on Vevo are syndicated to YouTube, with Google and Vevo sharing the advertising revenue.

As of 2017, the most-watched English-language video on YouTube was "Shape of You" by Ed Sheeran. As of 2018, the most-watched remix video on YouTube was "Te Bote" by Casper Mágico featuring Nio García, Darell, Nicky Jam, Bad Bunny, and Ozuna.

==== Official lo-fi Internet music clips ====
Following the shift toward internet broadcasting and the rising popularity of user-generated video sites such as YouTube around 2006, various independent filmmakers began films recording live sessions to present on the Web. All of these swiftly recorded clips are made with minimal budgets and share similar aesthetics with the lo-fi music movement of the early nineties. Offering freedom from the increasingly burdensome financial requirements of high-production movie-like clips, it began as the only method for little-known indie music artists to present themselves to a wider audience, but increasingly this approach has been taken up by such major mainstream artists as R.E.M. and Tom Jones.

==== Vertical videos ====
In the late 2010s, some artists began releasing alternative vertical videos tailored to mobile devices in addition to music videos; these vertical videos are generally platform-exclusive. These vertical videos are often shown on Snapchat's "Discover" section or within Spotify playlists. Early adopters of vertical video releases include the number-one hit "Girls Like You" by Maroon 5 featuring Cardi B. "Idontwannabeyouanymore" by Billie Eilish is the most-watched vertical video on YouTube, although the presence of borders in the video actually make it in landscape.

==== Lyric videos ====
A lyric video is a type of music video in which the lyrics to the song are the primary visual element of the video. As such, they can be created with relative ease and often serve as a supplemental video to a more traditional music video.

The music video for R.E.M.'s 1986 song "Fall on Me" interspersed the song's lyrics with abstract film footage. In 1987, Prince released a video for his song "Sign o' the Times". The video featured the song's words pulsing to the music, presented alongside abstract geometric shapes, an effect created by Bill Konersman. The following year, the video for the Talking Heads single "(Nothing But) Flowers" composed of the song's lyrics superimposed onto or next to members of the band, was released. In 1990, George Michael released "Praying for Time" as a lyric video. He had refused to make a traditional music video, so his label released a simple clip that displayed the song's lyrics on a black screen.

Lyric videos rose to greater prominence in the 2010s, when it became relatively easy for artists to disperse videos through websites such as YouTube. Many do not feature any visual related to the musician in question, but merely a background with the lyrics appearing over it as they are sung in the song. In 2011, death metal band Krokmitën released the first lyric video for an entire album, "Alpha-Beta". The concept album video featured imagery pulsing to the music and stylized typography created by bandleader Simlev. As of 2017, the 2016 song "Closer" by The Chainsmokers, featuring vocalist Halsey, is the most-watched lyric video on YouTube.

== Censorship ==
As the concept and medium of a music video is a form of artistic expression, artists have been on many occasions censored if their content is deemed offensive. What may be considered offensive will differ in countries due to censorship laws and local customs and ethics. In most cases, the record label will provide and distribute videos edited or provide both censored and uncensored videos for an artist. In some cases, it has been known for music videos to be banned in their entirety as they have been deemed far too offensive to be broadcast.

=== 1980s ===
The first video to be banned by MTV was Queen's 1982 hit "Body Language". Due to thinly veiled homoerotic undertones plus much skin and sweat (but apparently not enough clothing, save that worn by the fully clothed members of Queen themselves), it was deemed unsuitable for a television audience at the time. However, the channel did air Olivia Newton-John's 1981 video for the hit song "Physical", which lavished camera time on male models working out in string bikinis who spurn her advances, ultimately pairing off to walk to the men's locker rooms holding hands, though the network ended the clip before the overt homosexual "reveal" ending in some airings. The video for "Girls on Film" by Duran Duran, which featured topless women mud wrestling and other depictions of sexual fetishes was banned by the BBC. MTV did air the video, albeit in a heavily edited form.

Laura Branigan initially protested an MTV request to edit her "Self Control" video in 1984, but relented when the network refused to air the William Friedkin-directed clip, featuring the singer lured through an increasingly debauched, if increasingly stylized, series of nightclubs by a masked man who ultimately takes her to bed. In 1989, Cher's "If I Could Turn Back Time" video (where the singer performs the song in an extremely revealing body suit surrounded by a ship full of cheering sailors) was restricted to late-night broadcasts on MTV. The Sex Pistols' video for "God Save the Queen" was banned by the BBC for being "in gross bad taste". Mötley Crüe's video for "Girls, Girls, Girls" was banned by MTV for having completely nude women dancing around the members of the band in a strip club, although they did produce another version that was accepted by MTV.

In 1983, Entertainment Tonight ran a segment on censorship and "Rock Video Violence". The episode explored the impact of MTV rock video violence on the youth of the early 1980s. Excerpts from the music videos of Michael Jackson, Duran Duran, Golden Earring, Kiss, Kansas, Billy Idol, Def Leppard, Pat Benatar and The Rolling Stones were shown. Dr. Thomas Radecki of the National Coalition on TV Violence was interviewed accusing the fledgling rock video business of excessive violence. Night Tracks producer Tom Lynch weighed in on the effects of the video violence controversy. Recording artists John Cougar Mellencamp, Gene Simmons and Paul Stanley of Kiss, along with directors Dominic Orlando and Julien Temple, provided a defense of their work. The episode's conclusion was that the controversy will continue to grow. Some artists have used censorship as a publicity tool. In the 1980s, the show Top of the Pops was censorious in its approach to video content, so some acts made videos that they knew would be censored, using the resulting public controversy to promote their release. Examples of this tactic were Duran Duran's aforementioned "Girls on Film" and Frankie Goes to Hollywood with "Relax", directed by Bernard Rose.

=== 1990s ===
In 1991, the dance segment of Michael Jackson's "Black or White" was edited out because it showed Jackson "inappropriately" touching himself in it. His most controversial video, for "They Don't Care About Us", was banned from MTV, VH1, and BBC due to the alleged anti-Semitic messages in the song and the visuals in the background of the "Prison Version" of the video.

Madonna is the artist most associated with music video censorship. The controversy surrounding Madonna's marketing of her sexuality began with the video for "Lucky Star", and amplified over time due to clips such as "Like a Virgin". Outcry occurred over the subject matter (relating to teenage pregnancy) discussed in the video for the song "Papa Don't Preach". "Like a Prayer" courted heavy criticism due to its religious, sexual, and racially oriented imagery. In 1990, Madonna's music video for the song "Justify My Love" was banned by MTV due to its depiction of sadomasochism, homosexuality, cross-dressing, and group sex which generated a media firestorm. In Canada, the debate over the banning of "Justify My Love" by the music video network MuchMusic led to the launching in 1991 of Too Much 4 Much, a series of occasional, late-night specials (still being aired in the early 2000s) in which videos officially banned by MuchMusic were broadcast, followed by a panel discussion regarding why they were removed.

In 1992, The Shamen's video for the song "Ebeneezer Goode" was banned by the BBC due to its perceived subliminal endorsement of the recreational drug Ecstasy. The Prodigy's 1997 video for "Smack My Bitch Up" was banned in some countries due to depictions of drug use and nudity. The Prodigy's video for "Firestarter" was banned by the BBC due to its references to arson.

In 1993, the Australian rock band INXS' song "The Gift" was banned by MTV due to its use of Holocaust and Gulf War footage, among images of famine, pollution, war, and terrorism. As well as this, metal band Tool's music video for "Prison Sex" was banned from MTV, as the video and lyrics touch on the sensitive matter of child abuse.

=== 2000s ===
In 2000, the music video for "Rock DJ" by Robbie Williams caused controversy due to the graphic nature of the video which features Williams stripping naked then peeling off his skin to reveal bloody flesh, followed by ripping off his muscles and organs until he is nothing but a blood-soaked skeleton. The video was censored in the UK during daytime hours and was broadcast unedited after 10 pm. The video was banned in Dominican Republic due to allegations of satanism.

In 2001, Björk's video for "Pagan Poetry" was banned from MTV for depictions of sexual intercourse, fellatio, and body piercings. Her next single, "Cocoon", was also banned by MTV as it featured a nude Björk (though the nude body was usually a fitted bodysuit rigged with red string).

In 2002, t.A.T.u.'s video for "All the Things She Said" caused controversy as it featured the young Russian girls, Lena Katina and Yulia Volkova, embracing and eventually kissing. British TV presenters Richard and Judy campaigned to have the video banned claiming it pandered to "pedophiles" with the use of school uniforms and young girls kissing, although the campaign failed. Capitalizing on the controversy, the kiss was choreographed into their live performances. Top of the Pops aired the girls' performance with the kiss replaced by audience footage. NBC's The Tonight Show with Jay Leno cut away from the girls' kiss to shots of the band. Throughout their promotional tour, t.A.T.u. protested by appearing in shirts reading "censored".

In 2004, Maroon 5's video for "This Love" generated controversy due to intimate scenes between the frontman Adam Levine and his then-girlfriend. Despite those particular scenes being shot at strategic angles, a censored version was released with a stream of computer-generated flowers added in to cover up more. The video for "(s)AINT" by Marilyn Manson was banned by their label due to its violence and sexual content. The following year, Eminem's video for "Just Lose It" caused controversy over its parody of Michael Jackson's 2005 child molestation trial, plastic surgery, and hair catching fire during the filming of a Pepsi commercial. The video was banned from BET, and Jackson spoke out against the video, calling it "inappropriate and disrespectful to me, my children, my family, and the community at large". In 2004, many family groups and politicians lobbied for the banning of the Eric Prydz video "Call on Me" for containing women dancing in a sexually suggestive way; however, the video was not banned.

As of 2005, the Egyptian state censorship committee banned at least 20 music videos which featured sexual connotations due to Muslim moral viewpoints. The music video of "These Boots Are Made for Walkin'" which featured Jessica Simpson in character as Daisy Duke, was controversial for featuring Simpson in "revealing" outfits and washing the General Lee car in her bikini. The controversy resulted in the music video being banned in some countries.

In 2008, Justice's video for their song "Stress" was boycotted by several major music television channels due to allegations of racism and violence; the video depicts several youths committing different crimes throughout the streets of Paris, with the youths mainly being of North African descent.

While country music has largely avoided controversy surrounding video content, it has never been immune. The music video for the 2003 Rascal Flatts song "I Melt" is a case in point, gaining notoriety for clips featuring guitarist Joe Don Rooney's bare buttocks, and model Christina Auria taking a shower nude. The video was the first aired on CMT to show nudity, and eventually reached #1 on the network's "Top Twenty Countdown" program. However, GAC banned the video when the group refused to release an edited version.

=== 2010s ===
In 2010, Thirty Seconds to Mars' video "Hurricane" was censored due to its major elements of violence, nudity and sex. The short film was later released with a clean version that can air on television. The explicit version is available on the band's official website with a viewing certificate of 18+.

In 2010, a rumor circulated that Lady Gaga's video "Telephone" was banned by MTV, a rumour which reached some press outlets. The rumor claimed that MTV had banned the video because the content could not be shown within their programming. MTV denied the ban and showed the video frequently on European MTV programming. Lady Gaga's previous videos have also attracted criticism for their sexually suggestive content; the video for "LoveGame" was not played on the Australian music video program Video Hits; however, other Australian programs aired the video uncensored. The video for "Alejandro" was criticized by the Catholic League, for showing the singer dressed in a red latex fetish version of a nun's habit, simulating rape, and appearing to swallow a rosary.

Ciara's video for "Ride" was banned by BET, with the network citing that the video was too sexually charged. The video was also subsequently banned by all UK television channels.

In 2011, the video for "S&M", which features the Barbadian singer Rihanna whipping a tied-up white man, taking hostages and indulging in a lesbian kiss, was banned in eleven countries and was flagged as inappropriate for viewers that are under 18 on YouTube.

=== 2020s ===
In 2019, Lil Nas X's viral song "Old Town Road" became the longest-running number-one song on the Billboard Hot 100 chart. However, it was his follow-up song named "Montero (Call Me By Your Name)" which was released in 2021 that raised the controversy. In the music video for "Montero", Lil Nas X included various provocative scenes, including one in which he gives a lap dance to Satan. The video was widely criticized by conservative and religious groups, who saw it as promoting Satanism and immorality. Lil Nas X responded to the backlash by defending that it was just a way of expressing his own sexuality and challenging societal norms. He profited from the controversy by promoting his own merchandise, including a pair of "Satan Shoes" that were made in collaboration with a company called MSCHF, which featured a bronze pentagram, an inverted cross and a drop of real human blood. The controversy related to "Montero" eventually helped dragging the song to even greater success, debuting at number one on the Billboard Hot 100 and earning applause from critics for its bold and innovative approach to music and visuals.

In 2023, the music video for "I'm Not Here to Make Friends" by Sam Smith drew criticism and sparked debate over whether it should be censored. Critics claimed that the music video was sexualised, irresponsible, improper, and not good for society, where as the discussion on ITV's Good Morning Britain inquired as to whether it was no different and similar to the Madonna music videos of the '80s and '90s. Proponents claimed that it was not different to Rocky Horror Picture Show, or the Frankie Goes to Hollywood's "Relax" music video that were successful decades ago.

In 2023, the music video "Try That in a Small Town" by Jason Aldean was banned by CMT due to controversy. Lyrics expressed behaviors that supposedly happen in the big cities that would be perceived to not be liked in a small town, such as, "carjack an old lady"; "cuss out a cop"; and "stomp on the flag." United States State Representative Justin Jones of Tennessee, a US Democrat, condemned the song on Twitter, describing it as a "heinous song calling for racist violence" that promoted "a shameful vision of gun extremism and vigilantism."

Aldean then defended himself on Twitter, asserting that he had been wrongly accused of releasing a pro-lynching song, and that he was "not too pleased" with the 2020 Black Lives Matter protests.

In 2024, Spaniard authorities announced an investigation into pop star Katy Perry following the filming of a music video on the islands of Ibiza and Formentera. The video, for her song "Lifetimes", featured Perry dancing along the beaches of the Balearic Islands and attending nightclubs.

According to a press release issued by local government authorities, some scenes had allegedly been filmed in areas where Perry and her production company had not obtained the necessary permits.

Kim Kardashian's 2024 cover of the Christmas song Santa Baby, produced by her brother-in-law Travis Barker (Blink-182), attracted significant public attention for its unconventional music video. The video depicts Kardashian crawling on all fours through a surreal house party, encountering various unusual scenes, including a donkey, a man dressed as Jesus, and a businessman petting a reindeer mascot. The video's eccentric visuals prompted mixed reactions from viewers, with some describing it as "unhinged," "scary," and "demonic."

== Commercial release ==
=== Video album ===
Music videos have been released commercially on physical formats such as videotape, LaserDisc, DVD and Blu-ray. Similar to an audio album, a video album is a long-form release containing multiple music videos on a disc. The market for video albums is considerably smaller than for audio albums and audio singles. Video albums are eligible for gold certifications from the Recording Industry Association of America (RIAA) after record labels shipped 50,000 units to retailers, while both audio albums and singles have to ship 500,000 units to achieve gold. One of the early video albums was Eat to the Beat (1979) by American rock band Blondie, a videocassette containing music videos of all tracks from their fourth studio album of the same name. It was produced by Paul Flattery for Jon Roseman Productions and directed by David Mallet. The music videos were recorded in New York and New Jersey, with some songs featuring the band playing in a concert fashion, and some others having scenarios based on the songs' lyrics. Another popular video album was Olivia Physical (1982) by Olivia Newton-John, which won the Video of the Year at the 25th Grammy Awards. The video collection features music videos of all songs from her ninth studio album, Physical (1981).

Due to the increase of video albums popularity, Billboard magazine introduced the weekly best-selling music video sales ranking in the United States, titled the Top Music Videocassette chart on March 30, 1985 (now known as Music Video Sales chart). Its first chart-topper was Private Dancer (1984), a videocassette by Tina Turner containing four music videos. The Official Charts Company began the similar chart in the United Kingdom on January 30, 1994, with Bryan Adams's So Far So Good reaching number one. According to the RIAA, the Eagles' Farewell 1 Tour-Live from Melbourne (2005) is the top-certified longform music video with 30-time platinum (three million units shipped), while the Rolling Stones' Four Flicks (2005) is the top-certified music video boxset with 19-time platinum (1.9 million units shipped). The term "visual album" achieved prominence in modern usage after the release of the urban singer-songwriter Beyoncé's 2013 self-titled album.

=== Video single ===
A video single contains no more than three music videos in the form of a videotape, LaserDisc or DVD. In 1983, British synth-pop band the Human League released the first commercial video single titled The Human League Video Single on both VHS and Betamax. It was not a huge commercial success due to the high retail price of £10.99, compared to around £1.99 for a 7" vinyl single. The VHS single gained higher levels of mainstream popularity when Madonna released "Justify My Love" as a video single in 1990 following the blacklisting of the video by MTV. "Justify My Love" remains the best-selling video single of all time.

The DVD single was introduced in the late 1990s as a replacement for the videotape single. Although many record companies in the United States refused to issue CD singles, they readily issued DVD singles, and some popular DVD singles include Kelly Clarkson's "A Moment Like This", Jessica Simpson's "With You", Beyoncé's "Crazy in Love", Christina Aguilera's "Fighter", Britney Spears's "Toxic" and Iron Maiden's "Satellite 15... The Final Frontier". According to the RIAA, a music video single is defined as 1-2 songs per video OR under 15 minutes running time. In 2003, the first certified platinum and gold music DVD singles were certified by the RIAA. Noteworthy early DVD singles in the United States include Sly and Robbie's "Superthruster" (1999), Björk's "All Is Full of Love" (1999), and Madonna's "Music" (2000).

In the United Kingdom where up to 3 physical formats are eligible for the chart, DVD singles are quite common (with the single available on DVD as well as CD and/or vinyl record). As with other single formats, DVD singles have a limited production run, often causing them to become collector's items. The DVD single never experienced a high amount of popularity in the United Kingdom because when artists started releasing them in the early 2000s, the CD single had started declining. They were also seen as expensive. Some artists would not release DVD singles and instead put their music videos as enhanced content on a CD single/album.

Beginning in the early 2000s, artists in Japan may release singles in the CD+DVD format. Japanese singer Ayumi Hamasaki has been credited as the "creator of the CD+DVD format"; one of the examples is her 2005 single "Fairyland". The CD+DVD format is more expensive and usually contains one or more music videos, and sometimes a "making of" section or other bonus material is included.

The Japanese music conglomerate Hello! Project released corresponding DVD singles for almost all of its CD single releases. The company calls them Single Vs. A Single V usually contains a music video for the title song plus several more of its versions and a making-of. Sometimes, an Event V (エベントV) will be released at Hello! Project fan club events that will offer alternate shots of a promotional video, or bonus footage, like backstage footage or footage from a photoshoot not released anywhere else. As of 2017, Single Vs were no longer released; instead Hello! Project acts now put the music videos on DVDs included in a CD single's limited edition. The DVD singles are popular and chart in the generic Oricon DVD sales chart, due to the non-existence of a separate DVD single ranking in Japan.

== Unofficial music videos ==
Unofficial, fan-made music videos are typically made by synchronizing existing footage from other sources, such as television series or films, with the song. The first known fan video, or songvid, was created by Kandy Fong in 1975 using still images from Star Trek loaded into a slide carousel and played in conjunction with a song. Fan videos made using videocassette recorders soon followed. With the advent of easy distribution over the internet and cheap video-editing software, fan-created videos began to gain wider notice in the late 1990s.

A well-known example of an unofficial video is one made for Danger Mouse's illegal mashup from his The Grey Album, of the Jay-Z track "Encore" with music sampled from the Beatles' White Album, in which concert footage of the Beatles is remixed with footage of Jay-Z and hip-hop dancers.

In 2004, a Placebo fan from South Africa made a claymation video for the band's song "English Summer Rain" and sent it to the band. They liked the result so much that it was included on their greatest hits DVD.

In 2016, a Flash animation for the song "Come Together" by the Beatles was included on The Beatles Blu-ray disc.

== Music video shows ==
- 24 Hours of Love (MTV2; premiered in 2002)
- 3ABN Today Music (3ABN Praise Him Music Network)
- ABC Rocks (ABC)
- America's Top 10 (Syndication)
- Back to Nature (3ABN, 3ABN International, 3ABN Praise Him Music Network)
- 106 & Park (BET; 2000-December 19, 2014)
- CD:UK Hotshots (ITV1; 1998–2007)
- Top of the Pops (BBC; 1964–2006)
- The Click List: Top 10 Videos (Logo)
- Countdown (Australian Broadcasting Corporation)
- 8-Track Flashback (VH1)
- Friday Night Videos (NBC)
- Goodnight LA (KABC)
- Good Rockin' Tonite (CBC)
- Headbangers Ball (MTV2)
- Jack's Big Music Show (Nick Jr.)
- Jukebox (AITV) (Syndication)
- Kidsongs (PBS)
- Kids Praise Too! (3ABN, 3ABN International, 3ABN Kids Network)
- Loaded (Fuse)
- Los 10+ Pedidos (MTV Latin America; 1999-2010, 2015-2016)
- Magnify Him (3ABN Dare to Dream Network, 3ABN Praise Him Music Network)
- Melodías del Corazón (3ABN Latino)
- Melody From My Heart (3ABN, 3ABN International, 3ABN Praise Him Music Network)
- The Metric Marvels (NBC)
- Myx Backtrax] (Myx)
- My Myx (Myx)
- Myx Daily Top 10 (Myx)
- Myx Hit Chart (Myx)
- Myx International Top 20 (Myx)
- Myx Take 5 (Myx)
- Night Tracks (TBS)
- Piano Praise (3ABN, 3ABN Praise Him Music Network)
- Pinoy Myx (Myx)
- Pinoy Myx Countdown (Myx)
- Playboy's Hot Rocks (Playboy TV)
- Pop Myx (Myx)
- Pop-Up Video (VH1)
- Praise (3ABN, 3ABN International, 3ABN Praise Him Music Network)
- Rage (Australian Broadcasting Corporation)
- Schoolhouse Rock (ABC)
- The Smothers Brothers Comedy Hour (CBS; first broadcast in 1968)
- Sidewalks: Video Nite (Syndication)
- Soundwaves (Syndication)
- Star Myx (Myx)
- Video Hits Australia (Network Ten)
- Video Hits Canada (CBC)
- Video Jukebox (TV series) (HBO)
- "Video Soul" (BET)
- TRL (MTV)
- Power Fuse (Fuse)
- Rap City (BET)
- MuchOnDemand (MuchMusic)
- Music Station (TV Asahi)
- New York Hot Tracks (Syndication)
- U Choose 40 (C4)
- VH1 Top 20 Video Countdown (VH1; 1995-2015)
- Volvamos a la Naturaleza (3ABN Latino)
- Your Favorites by Request (3ABN, 3ABN International, 3ABN Praise Him Music Network)

== See also ==
- Concert video design
- First 24-hour music video
- Music
- Music video game
- List of one-shot music videos
- Semiotics of music videos
- Video art
