= Color-Sonic =

American 35mm film loop visual jukebox

Color-Sonic was a type of visual jukebox developed in the United States in the 1960s. They were the first ones to use continuous loop cartridges, which were both more durable and more easily replaced than the film reels used by their competitors, Cinebox and Scopitone. The Color-Sonic films were shot on 35 mm, as opposed to the 16 mm film used for Scopitone and Cinebox. Before Color-Sonic, Panoram had already pioneered the use of visual jukeboxes in America.

== Company history ==
In 1966, Henry A. Schwartz filed a patent for the Color-Sonic, also known as Combi 150 (a visual jukebox) which was assigned to Color-Sonics Inc. alias National Company Inc. in New York. The Color-Sonic machines were manufactured at the facilities of the National Company Inc. in Melrose, Massachusetts. COLOR-SONICS, INC. was incorporated on May 7, 1966, in New York county with company number 198358. It is located at 122 East 42nd St. New York, New York, 10168. The National Company Inc. also used to own The National Radio Company of New York, NY.

== Color-Sonic music videos ==
The video films themselves were made at Paramount Studios by Official Films, which was headed by Robert Blees, a former producer of TV shows such as Bus Stop and Combat!. Robert Altman was hired to direct several Color-Sonics films: "Girl Talk" by Bobby Troup, a short called The Party set to the song "Bittersweet Samba" by Herb Alpert and the Tijuana Brass, and two shorts featuring Lili St. Cyr. In addition, Color-Sonics produced a fairly sophisticated music video titled "These Boots Are Made for Walkin' " by Nancy Sinatra which was directed by Robert Sidney.

Some of the 200 music videos featured on Color-Sonics (with Color-Sonics catalog number in brackets, where known) included;

1. The Party aka In Crowd featuring Herb Alpert & the Tijuana Brass, "Bittersweet Samba" (directed by Robert Altman) (026)
2. Herb Alpert & the Tijuana Brass: "Swinger from Seville" (018)
3. Herb Alpert & the Tijuana Brass: "Whipped Cream" (012)
4. Ray Anthony Show: "What'd I Say" (031)
5. Nai Bonet: "Jelly Belly"
6. Nai Bonet: "Seventh Veil" (033)
7. Bobby Breen: "Up on the Roof" (320)
8. Brothers Two Trio: "Chickie"
9. Andy Cavell & the Boscoe Holder Dancers: "Speedy Gonzalez"
10. Fay Craig: "Bongo Baby" (314)
11. Fay Craig: "Mirage" (309)
12. Colorama Dancers, Beach Party featuring The Dovells, "You Can't Sit Down" (111)
13. The Eggheads: "Greenback Dollar" (103)
14. The Eggheads: "Swing Low, Sweet Chariot"
15. The Eggheads: "This Little Lite of Mine" (101)
16. Lynn Elliot: "Baby Face" (004)
17. Shawn Elliott: "Shame and Scandal in the Family" (131)
18. Shane Fenton: "I Ain't Got Nobody"
19. Connie Francis, title(s) unknown
20. Wayne Gibson: "I Like It" (310)
21. Johnny B. Great: "If I Had a Hammer" (307)
22. Janice Harper: "Love Is a Dangerous Thing" (014)
23. Janice Harper: "The Thrill Is Gone" (015)
24. Mel Henke: "Every Little Movement / The Streets of Cairo"
25. Dawn Holly: "Coquette" (112)
26. Fran Jeffries: "Ain't Misbehavin' "
27. Fran Jeffries: "No Moon at All" (002)
28. Fran Jeffries: "Show Me the Way to Go Home" (201)
29. Fran Jeffries: "Squeeze Me" (035)
30. Karen Jensen: "I'm an Old Cowhand" (029)
31. Lainie Kazan: "Blues in the Night" (010)
32. Lainie Kazan: "I Cried For You"
33. Joi Lansing: "All of Me"
34. Tommy Leonetti: "The Way You Look Tonight"
35. Julie London: "Daddy"
36. Julie London: "Watermelon Man" (024)
37. Shorty Long: "Night fo' Last"
38. Mary Jane Mangler: "She's Not There" (017)
39. Natali Moore: "Big Bad Bill" (044)
40. Jaye P. Morgan: "Will He Like Me" (005)
41. Kitty Oliver: "Kansas City" (043)
42. Mary Pastor: "Winning Pair" (135)
43. Frankie Randall: "More" (dir. by Bob Baker) (020)
44. Frankie Randall: "The Rules of the Road" (dir. by Bob Baker) (013)
45. Boots Randolph: "Charlie Brown" (016)
46. Tina Robbins: "Glory of Love" (106)
47. Terry Ross: "My Baby Just Cares for Me"
48. Lonnie Sattin: "Sweetheart" (108)
49. Frank Sinatra Jr.: "Love for Sale"
50. Nancy Sinatra: "These Boots Are Made for Walkin' " (directed by Robert Sidney) (011)
51. Nancy Sinatra: "The Shadow of Your Smile" (directed by Robert Sidney) (008)
52. Lili St. Cyr: "Ebb Tide" (directed by Robert Altman) (114)
53. Lili St. Cyr: "“Speak Low" (directed by Robert Altman) (021)
54. Bobby Troup: "Girl Talk" (directed by Robert Altman) (034)
55. Ozel Turkbas: "Bedevilled Belly Dancer"
56. Leslie Uggams, title(s) unknown
57. Unknown artist: "Agent 006" (040)
58. Unknown artist: "Alley Cat" (202)
59. Unknown artist: "Besame Mucho"
60. Unknown artist: "Bikini Beach"
61. Unknown artist: "Cobra Dance"
62. Unknown artist: "Derelict"
63. Unknown artist: "Down by the Riverside"
64. Unknown artist: "Every Little Movement" (207)
65. Unknown artist: "The Girl from Ipanema" (203)
66. Unknown artist: "Goldie"
67. Unknown artist: "Hey Look Me Over"
68. Unknown artist: "Lady in Red" (128)
69. Unknown artist: "Lemon Tree"
70. Unknown artist: "The Limbo"
71. Unknown artist: "Mack the Knife"
72. Unknown artist: "Night Train"
73. Unknown artist: "St. Louis Blues" (204)
74. Unknown artist: "San Francisco"
75. Unknown artist: "Sea Witch" (205)
76. Unknown artist: "Seven-Eleven Go-Go" (134)
77. Unknown artist: "Sugar Daddy"
78. Unknown artist: "What a Difference a Day Makes"
79. Unknown artist: "You Are My Sunshine" (036)
80. Unknown artist: "You're Driving Me Crazy" (206)
81. Vi Velasco: "Bye Bye Black Bird" (039)
82. Mary Wells: "All My Lovin' " (022)
83. Mary Wells: "He Loves You"
