= Jennings & Company =

O. D. Jennings & Company
- Industry: slot machines, pinball and vending machines
- Founded: 1906 (as Industry Novelty Company, Inc.)
- Defunct: 1980s
- Fate: Merger
- Headquarters: Chicago
- Key people: Ode D. Jennings (founder)

Jennings & Company was a leading manufacturer of slot machines in the United States and also manufactured other coin-operated machines, including pinball machines, from 1906 to the 1980s. It was founded by Ode D. Jennings as Industry Novelty Company, Incorporated of Chicago. On the death of its founder in 1953, the company was succeeded by Jennings & Company.

== History ==
Ode D. Jennings was born in Kentucky on September 6, 1874.

Ode D. Jennings worked for the Mills Novelty Company and ran The Spectatorium, a penny arcade, for that company at the Louisiana Purchase Exposition (the 1904 World's Fair in St. Louis, Missouri).

In 1906, Ode Jennings established Industry Novelty Company, Incorporated. Its business was the refurbishment of slot machines manufactured by Mills.

Ode Jennings acquired United States patent 1,403,933, granted on 17 January 1922, for an improved mechanical coin-selecting device. The improvement related to the ejection of coins that were too small.

In July 1923, O. D. Jennings & Co. had purchased out of liquidation the business of the Garbell Typewriter Corporation of Chicago, which manufactured the GAR-BELL portable typewriter, invented by Max Garbell. Despite further improvements, which were protected by patents, the machine was a failure in the market.

In 1925, Ode Jennings moved to a house at what would become known as 220 Civic Drive (originally Schaumburg Road) in the village of Schaumburg, Illinois. The house would remain his home until his death.

On November 24, 1925, Ode Jennings was granted, as inventor, United States patent 1,562,771 for an improved mechanical coin-control apparatus. The improved apparatus was said to be more efficient and to prevent subsequent coins jamming the apparatus while the first coin was being accepted.

Between 1935 and 1936, O. D. Jennings & Co. manufactured a payout pinball machine called the Sportsman. The device was a gambling device, more akin to a slot machine than a modern pinball table. Some of the technology in the machine was protected by United States patent 2,003,349, granted to inventor Clifford R. Dumble.

On November 21, 1953, at 79, Ode Jennings died at home in Schaumburg, Illinois, after 47 years leading his company. He left everything to his wife, Jeannette Isle Jennings, with instructions to donate it to his church and local hospitals upon her death. On March 19, 1954, Jennings & Company was incorporated in Illinois and purchased the assets of O. D. Jennings & Company from his estate.

On May 15, 1957, Jennings & Company was merged into Hershey Manufacturing Company of Illinois, a company that had been incorporated on April 27, 1939. Over 80% of the business of Hershey Manufacturing then comprised the manufacture and sale of slot machines through its Jennings division, although it also engaged in governmental subcontract work and the manufacture of vending machines and photoflash equipment.

By the early 1960s, there were five major manufacturers of slot machines in the United States. The table below sets out their approximate comparative percentages of sales:

Leading United States manufacturers of slot machines in early 1960s
Manufacturer	Location	Share of market
Jennings & Co., a division of Hershey Manufacturing Co.	Chicago	40%
Mills Bell-O-Matic Corp.	Chicago and Reno	35%
Ace Manufacturing Co.	Maryland	15%
Buckley Manufacturing Co.	Maryland	5%
Las Vegas Coin Machine Co.	Las Vegas	5%
		100%

By the early 1960s, the business had been acquired by American Machine and Science Company (AMSC) owned by Wallace Carroll. AMSC also acquired Bell-O-Matic Corporation, and the two companies were merged to form TJM Corporation. TJM Corporation was run by two brothers, Tony Mills and John Mills. The merged company failed to compete successfully with the electro/mechanical models produced by Bally and also suffered because Bell-O-Matic had not protected its intellectual property rights in Japan. The company ceased trading in the 1980s.

In 1963, after the death of Jeannette Isle Jennings, the Jennings family house and surrounding lands were donated to the village of Schaumburg, Illinois and were used as the village hall until 1971. A gift of US$500,000 was denoted to the Northwestern Memorial Hospital of Chicago in November 1963 (then called the Passavant Memorial Hospital) and used to fund part of the construction of the Ode D. Jennings Pavilion, which opened in May 1966.
