= Snader Telescriptions =

Snader Telescriptions, produced for television from 1950 to 1952, were film versions of popular and classical music performances. Singers, dancers, orchestras, and novelty acts appeared in the Snader musicals. They were produced by Louis D. Snader, a Southern California theater owner who branched out into television and then real estate. Lionel Hampton was announced as the first "music world personality to face video film cameras."

Unlike Hollywood musicals (and the Soundies mini-musicals), in which the performers recorded the music in advance and pantomimed to the recording during filming, the Snader telescriptions filmed the performers live. Each artist or group typically filmed five songs in one day; some filmed even more. The most prolific telescriptions performers were exotic organist Korla Pandit (18 titles and 2 unreleased color test films), cowboy singer Tex Williams (16 titles) and bandleader Alvino Rey (14 titles). Among the dozens of artists who appeared in telescriptions were Allan Jones, Gloria Jean, The Weavers, Red Nichols, Cab Calloway, Tony Pastor, Charlie Barnet, Les Brown, Gale Storm, Carolina Cotton, Denise Lor, April Stevens, Connie Haines, Merle Travis, Bob Wills, and the King Sisters.

The name "telescriptions" is a combination of "television" and "transcriptions" (recordings intended for broadcast). Snader's three-minute films are similar to Soundies filmed in the 1940s, and Scopitones filmed in the 1960s.

Snader sold his telescription library to producer Ben Frye, who reprinted them as "Studio Telescriptions." Frye later assembled them into the half-hour television programs Showtime and Showtime at the Apollo, and into four theatrical feature films, all compiled in 1955.
