= Paramount Headliner =

Paramount Headliner refers to 1930s musical shorts or "one-reelers" by Paramount Pictures. Not all of the shorts had the term "Paramount Headliner" attached. In this context headliner primarily referred to bands and singers headlining on Broadway. Similar musical shorts were produced by other major studios.

== List of Paramount musical shorts ==
- 1935 Paramount Headliner: Broadway Highlights No. 1, featuring Sophie Tucker and Al Jolson
- 1936 Cavalcade of Music
- 1938 Paramount Headliner: Queens of the Air
- 1938 Bob Crosby and His Orchestra
- 1938 Paramount Headliner: Himber Harmonies, director Leslie Roush
- 1939 Tempo of Tomorrow - music of Richard Himber and his orchestra.
- 1939 Artie Shaw's Class in Swing director Leslie Roush
