= Mills Novelty Company =

Vending machine, slot machine, and jukebox manufacturer

Mills Novelty Company, Incorporated
- Industry: Slot machines, vending machines and jukeboxes
- Founded: April 13, 1891 (as M.B.M. Cigar Vending Company)
- Defunct: 1948 (jukeboxes); 1954 (vending machines); and 1980s (slot machines)
- Fate: Divestment (jukeboxes); divestment and merger (slot machines); and acquisition (vending machines)
- Successor: Mills Novelty Co. Restores & sells violanos and other Mills products
- Headquarters: Chicago
- Key people: Herbert Stephen Mills (deceased); Robert W. Brown CEO

The Mills Novelty Company, Incorporated of Chicago was once a leading manufacturer of coin-operated machines, including slot machines, vending machines, and jukeboxes, in the United States. Between about 1905 and 1930, the company's products included the Mills Violano-Virtuoso and its predecessors, celebrated machines that automatically played a violin and, after about 1909, a piano. By 1944, the name of the company had changed to Mills Industries, Incorporated. The slot machine division was then owned by Bell-O-Matic Corporation. By the late 1930s, vending machines were being installed by Mills Automatic Merchandising Corporation of New York.

== Family ==
The origins of the business lie with Mortimer Birdsul Mills, who was born in 1845 in Canada West (today's Ontario, Canada) but who later became a citizen of the United States, resident in Chicago, Illinois. Mortimer Mills would have 13 children. One son, Herbert Stephen Mills, was born in 1872 when his father was about 27. In 1892, Bert E. Mills, the youngest of Mortimer Mill's children was born. In about 1895, Fred L. Mills, the first of Herbert Mills' sons, was born. Ralph J. Mills, Herbert's second son, was born in July 1898. In about 1900, Herbert Mills, the third son of Herbert Stephen Mills was born. His younger brother, Hayden ("Bill") Mills, was born two years later in about 1902. The Mills brothers were raised in Oak Park, Illinois, and continued to live in that area until at least the mid-1930s. In 1929, Herbert Mills had died aged 57, leaving a fortune to his wife and eight children. The business was continued with Fred L. Mills, Herbert's first son, taking over as president while his three brothers, Ralph, Herbert, and Hayden held other top management positions.

== History ==
M.B.M. Cigar Vending Machine Company was founded in Chicago, Illinois on April 13, 1891 by Mortimer Mills, William Fuller, and George A. Fuller. The following day, Mortimer applied for United States patent 450,336 for a cigar vending machine that allowed the purchaser to select from a variety of cigars to be vended. The business was one of several operated by Mortimer and did not become a priority until the involvement of his third son Herbert Mills took over the business. The business started being referred to as Mills Novelty Company by 1896 and would officially change its name on July 3, 1897. In 1898, Mortimer Mills sold a controlling interest in the company to his son, Herbert S. Mills.

Mortimer B. Mills's patented 1891 contribution to cigar vending

In 1897, the company launched the Mills Owl, which was the first mechanical upright cabinet slot machine. The machine's design included a circle of owls perched on a lithographed tin wheel. The machine was a great success and the company would later adopt an owl motif as its trade mark.

In 1904, Mills Novelty Company was an exhibitor at the Louisiana Purchase Exposition, the 1904 St. Louis World's Fair. Its pavilion was run by Ode D. Jennings, who would later establish a competitor to Mills.

In 1906, Bert Mills left school at the age of 14 to work for Mills. He would later establish a separate company, Bert E. Mills Corporation, and, in 1946, help to develop the first vending machines to sell hot coffee.

In 1907, Herbert S. Mills collaborated with Charles Fey, the inventor of the slot machine, to produce the Mills Liberty Bell.

In 1926, the company had moved to a plant of 375,000 square feet (34,800 m^{2}), comprising a factory and administrative building, at 4100 Fullerton Avenue in the northwest of Chicago. Mills would distinguish itself by being one of only a few firms to manufacture both machines for gambling and vending machines.

In 1928, Mills entered the market for coin-operated radios and multi-selection phonographs. Between 1929 and 1948, the company manufactured and sold jukeboxes by the names of Hi-Boy, Troubadour, Dancemaster, Do-Re-Me, Swing King, Zephyr, Studio, Throne of Music, Empress, Panoram (a film-playing jukebox), and Constellation. A 1935 Dancemaster jukebox may be seen and heard at the Musical Museum, Brentford, England.

By May 1935, the company was run by the four sons of Herbert Stephen Mills: Fred L. Mills was President, Ralph J. Mills was Vice President in Charge of Sales, Herbert S. Mills Jr. was Treasurer and manager of the plant, and Hayden Mills was Secretary. The family's wealth included a private yacht named Minoco, after the family firm.

In about 1935, Mills was engaged by Coca-Cola to produce a standing dry automatic cooled vendor for bottles. The result, the model 47, was the first of its kind for Cola-Cola. By the late 1930s, gum vending machines were being installed by Mills Automatic Merchandising Corporation of New York. The machines made use of technology protected by United States patents assigned to Mills Novelty Company, including number 1,869,616.

In 1940, the Mills company introduced Soundies, short 16mm musical films played in a coin-operated movie jukebox, its projection and sound mechanism made by RCA. Wartime restrictions curtailed manufacturing of the jukeboxes, but the Mills company continued to produce and distribute new films for them into 1947.

During World War II, Mills received authorized federal funding to use its industrial facilities to produce bomb carriers, directional antenna, hand control slip rings, and poppet valves. The company changed its corporate name from the Mills Novelty Company to Mills Industries, Incorporated on September 1, 1943 to better reflect their wider manufacturing output initiated by the United States entry into World War II. In 1944, Mills representative D. W. Donahue was appointed to a planning committee of the coin machine manufacturing industry which would explore the transition of the former coin-operated machine factories from wartime manufacturing to their prior business. Before the end of the year though, the President of the organization Fred L Mills died of a stomach ailment at age 49 in St. Charles, Illinois.

On 1 April 1946, Bell-O-Matic Corporation was established as the exclusive distributor worldwide of all Bells and related products manufactured by Mills, and employed all of the former personnel of the Coin Machine Department of Mills. The stated rationale for the change was that the market for the products of the Coin Machine Department and the markets for the other products of Mills were quite distinct.

The last jukebox produced by the Mills Novelty Company was the Constellation (model number 951). By some mechanism, it appears that the front grille medallion from the jukebox ended up being incorporated in the 1948 Tucker Sedan, as a horn button.

By January 1948, the company was financially troubled and had petitioned the federal court for time to pay its debts. In December 1948, the company sold all of its phonography inventory to H. C. Evans of Chicago.

By the end of the 1940s, the Chairman of the Board of Mills was Ralph J. Mills and the President was Herbert S. Mills. Both men were Vice Presidents of Bell-O-Matic Corporation, whose officers included President V. C. Shay and Vice President in Charge of Advertising Grant F. Shay. Both companies were still located at building in Fullerton Avenue, Chicago. The Bell-O-Matic Corporation would later relocate to 135 Linden Street, Reno, Nevada.

In January 1951 it was reported that the industry manufacturing slot machines in the United States, then almost entirely based in Chicago, had suffered a major blow. A bill had been signed which banned slot machines from federal property and prohibited their shipment in commerce between states. At that time slot machines were allowed only in the states of Nevada, Montana and Maryland (where they were allowed in only four counties) but were operated illegally throughout the country.

In October 1954, F. L. Jacobs Company, a manufacturer of automobile parts based in Detroit, announced that it had acquired both Mills Industries, Inc. and Selmix Dispensers, Inc. of Long Island City, Queens (another manufacturer of equipment in the vending and dispensing industries). At that time the main products of Mills Industries were commercial ice cream freezers, frozen custard and milk shake machines and all types of vending machines. During 1953 and 1954, the company had added a coin-operated coffee vending machine, a three-flavor beverage bottle vendor, a citrus fruit juice vendor, and an ice cream package vendor to its product line. The intention of F. L. Jacobs Company was to operate Mills Industries as an independent subsidiary. However, component parts for the equipment were to be produced in the factories of F. L. Jacobs in Detroit, Traverse City, Michigan and Danville, Illinois. By September 1954, the controller of Mills Industries was James A. Pound. In November 1955, Mills Industries announced a project to consolidate, over a number of years, most of its operations in Traverse City, Michigan.

In November 1955, Mills Industries, Inc. announced a coin-operated vending machine, developed jointly with H. J. Heinz Company, that would dispense a tin can of hot food (one of a selection of six soups or dinners), a can opener, and a spoon. The cans were maintained a constant temperature of 150 °F (65 °C). The machine was intended for use in factories or large offices, and the company claimed that it was a first of a kind in the United States.

By the early 1960s, there were five major manufacturers of slot machines in the United States. The table below sets out their approximate comparative percentages of sales:

Leading United States manufacturers of slot machines in early 1960s
Manufacturer	Location	Share of market
Jennings & Co., a division of Hershey Manufacturing Co.	Chicago	40%
Mills Bell-O-Matic Corp.	Chicago and Reno	35%
Ace Manufacturing Co.	Maryland	15%
Buckley Manufacturing Co.	Maryland	5%
Las Vegas Coin Machine Co.	Las Vegas	5%
		100%

By the early 1960s, the Bell-O-Matic Corporation was being run by Tony Mills. He sold the company to American Machine and Science, Inc. (AMSC) owned by Wallace E. Carroll (later the chairman of Katy Industries), reportedly for USD500,000. AMSC had also acquired O. D. Jennings & Company and the two companies were merged to form TJM Corporation. AMSC would later merge with CRL Industries, Inc. (subsequently renamed CRL Inc.).

TJM Corporation was run by Tony Mills and his brother John Mills. The merged company failed to compete successfully with the electro/mechanical models produced by Bally and also suffered because it had not protected its intellectual property rights in Japan. The company ceased trading in the 1980s.

The name "The Mills Novelty Company" still survives today, in the form of a business that installs digital player systems in the Mills Violano Virtuoso. The registered owner of United States trade marks 78625380 (the Mills Novelty Co. prize ribbon) and 78625372 (the Violano Virtuoso Self-Playing Violin and Piano laurel wreath, lyre, banner and ribbons) is Robert W. Brown of Wisconsin.

== Mills Violano-Virtuoso ==
Mills Novelty Company's automatic violin and piano player

Henry K. Sandell's patented 1905 contribution to self-playing violins

The main inventor of the Mills Violano-Virtuoso was Henry Konrad Sandell, a contemporary of Thomas Edison, who was born in about 1878. Henry Sandell arrived in the United States from Sweden at the age of about 10 in about 1888. He was granted his first United States patent on the mechanism at the age of 21, in about 1899 and put his proposals and patents before the Mills Novelty Company in about 1903.

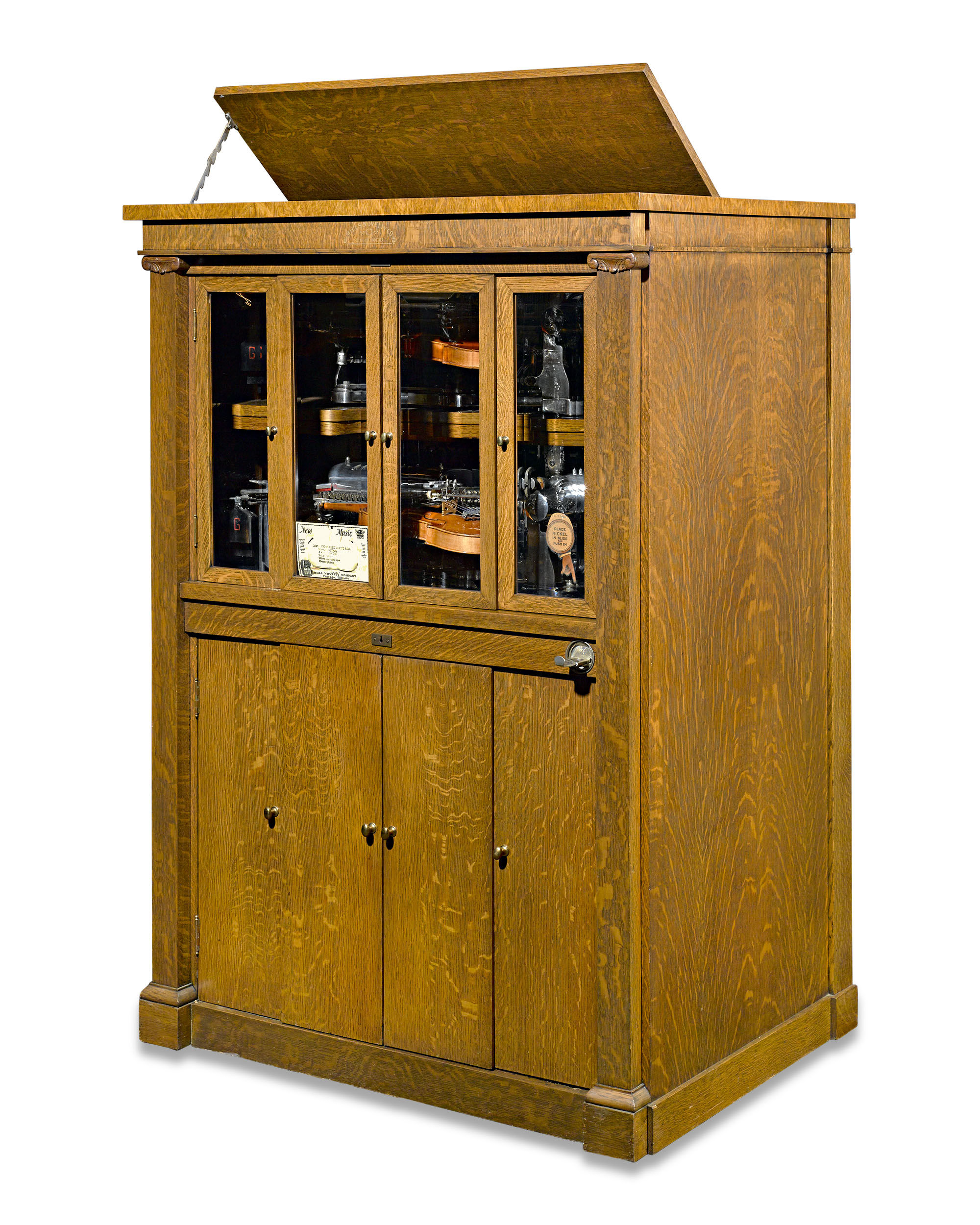
Mills Novelty Company DeLuxe Violano Virtuoso

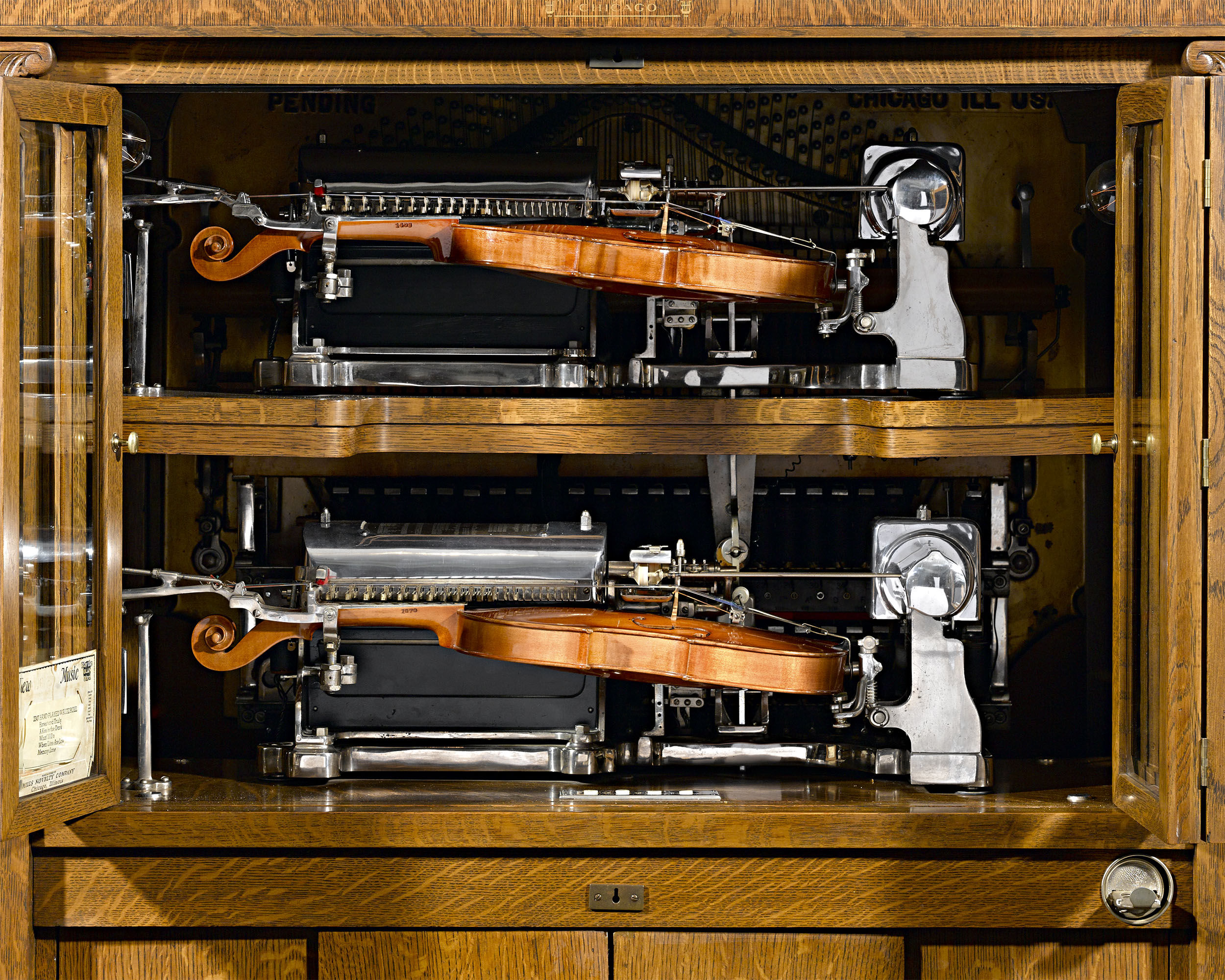
The DeLuxe model has two independently playing 64-note violins and a 44-note piano

On 27 March 1905 Henry Sandell filed an application for a United States patent for an electric self playing violin. The patent was granted, as number 807,871, on 19 December 1905 and assigned to Mills Novelty Company. This forerunner of the Violano-Virtuoso was known as the Automatic Virtuosa. It was marketed in 1905. At the time player pianos and mechanical coin-operated devices were extremely popular.

Subsequently, a piano mechanism was added to the violin mechanism, and the combination came to known as the Violano-Virtuoso.

The United States Patent and Trademark Office had a display of several significant inventions at the Alaska–Yukon–Pacific Exposition in Seattle in 1909, including an early Violano-Virtuoso. The company used this event to promote the Violano-Virtuoso as "Designated by the U.S. Government as one of the eight greatest inventions of the decade" on all subsequent machines.

The Violano-Virtuoso was not available to the public until 1911. Technology used in the instrument was patented on 4 June 1912, under United States patents 1,028,495 and 1,028,496. Early Violan-Virtuoso's have a glass divider between the violin mechanism and the piano mechanism. Machines with two violins are known as the De Luxe Model Violano-Virtuoso or the Double Mills.

In 1914 an instrument was made especially for the Smithsonian Institution.

Production seems to have finished in 1930. Henry Sandell died in 1948, aged 70. By his death he had been granted over 300 patents, many for the technology used in the Violano-Virtuoso.

The exact number of machines produced is not known. Estimates are between 4,000 and 5,000. Today, some sources estimate that only about 750 of the single machines and fewer than 100 of the Double Mills still exist, while other sources estimate that several thousand machines survive. However, the Violano-Virtuoso have the highest survival rate of any type of player piano; they required little maintenance when they were first produced and that is still the case for those that survive.

A common player piano operates pneumatically. The Violano-Virtuoso was all electric and all the moving parts were set in motion by electric motors or electromagnets. A company catalogue states that they ran on "any electric lighting current" and used "no more than one 16-candle power light." They were designed to operate on 110 volts direct current. In locations that had 110 volts alternating current (or other types of power supply) the instruments were used with a unique converter unit.

The violin had four strings, with an octave available on each string, and could reproduce 64 notes. All four strings could be played simultaneously. This allowed the possibility of four-part independent counterpoint. A vibrato could be produced.

The strings were played by small electric powered rollers, which were self-rosinating, and a chromatic set of metal 'fingers'. The violin had no finger board. A small metal "finger", activated by an electromagnet, rose from under the string lifting it in a V-shaped slot thus stopping off the string. The strings were bowed by four small wheels made of discs of celluloid clamped together in a dish-shaped form. These applied just the right pressure to the strings and were driven by a variable-speed controlled motor. This and a mute allowed the volume of sound produced to be varied. The violin produced a full tone and was able to sound 1/2 note double stops at ragtime tempi. The staccato coil allowed the bows to leave the string a fraction of a second before the 'fingers'. The violin stayed in tune by a sophisticated array of tuning arms and weights. The vibrato was produced by using an electromagnet to shake the tail-piece of the violin.

The piano had 44 notes, half the number of keys found on a normal piano keyboard. It was played by regular hammers using a standard player piano action. The hammers were activated by electromagnets. The piano frame was made of iron, shaped like a shield, and symmetrically strung. The bass strings were at the centre of the frame and the treble strings radiated out to the edges from the centre. This arrangement distributed the string pressure more evenly across the frame and helped keep the piano in tune.

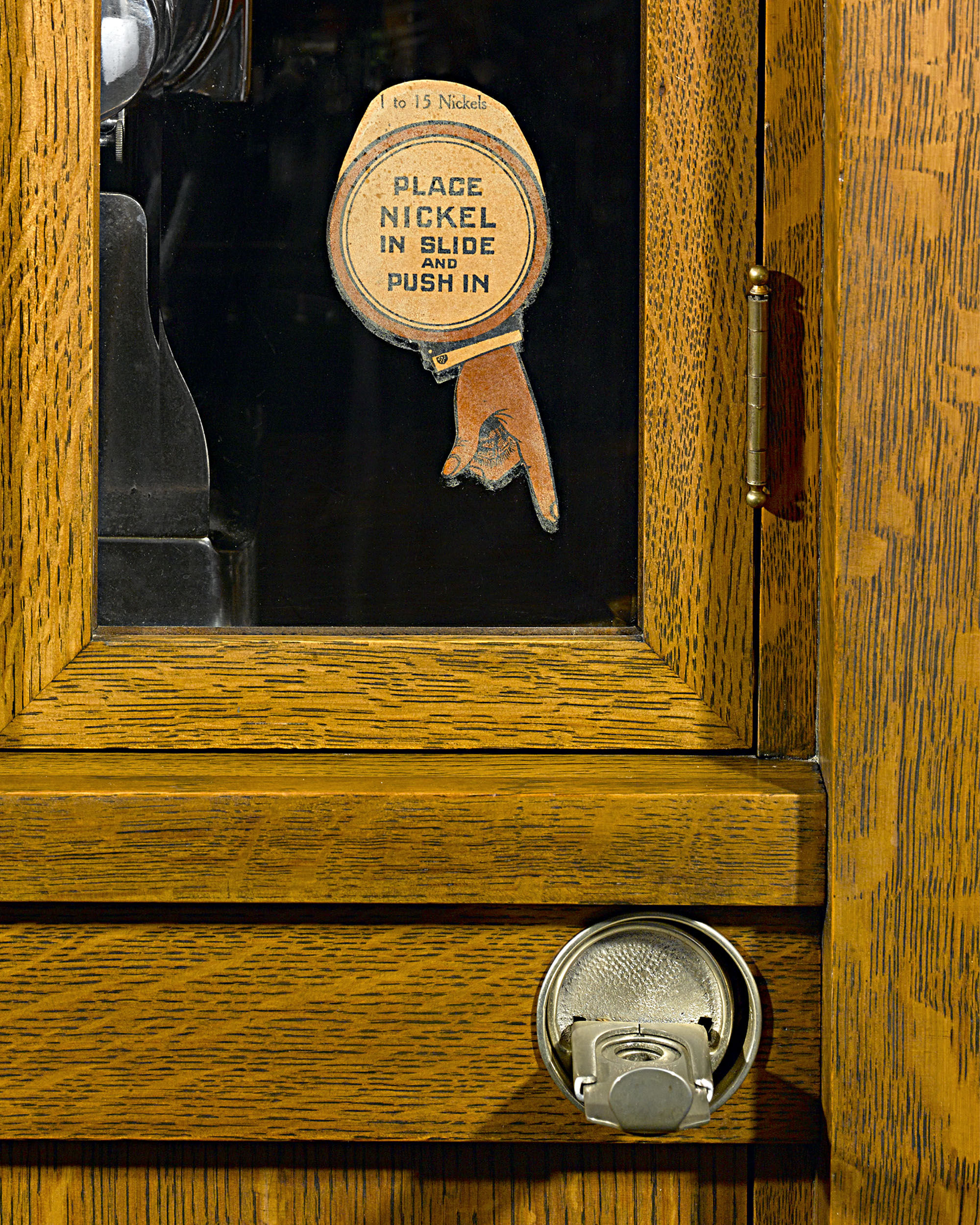
The machine plays with the insertion of a nickel in the slot

The Violano-Virtuoso was coin-operated and its mechanism was capable of holding up to 15 coins. Some models were made for domestic use and did not have the coin mechanism.

The instrument used rolls of perforated paper. Most of the rolls had five tunes on them, the popular tunes of the day. Individual tunes could not be selected. Over time, the Mills Novelty Company produced approximately 3,121 different rolls. Each arrangement of a song was identified by a unique number. Some songs appear on more than one rolls. Attempts have been made to produce a complete "rollography" for the Violano-Virtuoso. A list has been produced that covers more than half of the different rolls that were ever produced. Rolls 1 to about 1000 and 1800 to 2500 are well documented. Information between rolls 1000 and 1800 is very sparse and it may be that these roll numbers were never used.

The Violano-Virtuoso was a heavy object. The first page of the Violano Virtuoso manual stated that to lift the instrument from the delivery wagon would need "3 good men".

The Violano Virtuoso was designed for public places. The wooden cabinet in which the mechanism was housed could be oak or mahogany.

In addition to the Violano-Virtuoso, the Mills Novelty Company developed a variety of other automatic musical instruments. These included the Viol-Cello, the Viol-Xylophone, and the Mills String Quartette.

Two Violano Virtuosos, one standard version and one DeLuxe, may be seen and heard at the Musical Museum, Brentford, England.
