= Soundie =

1940s US musical film shorts

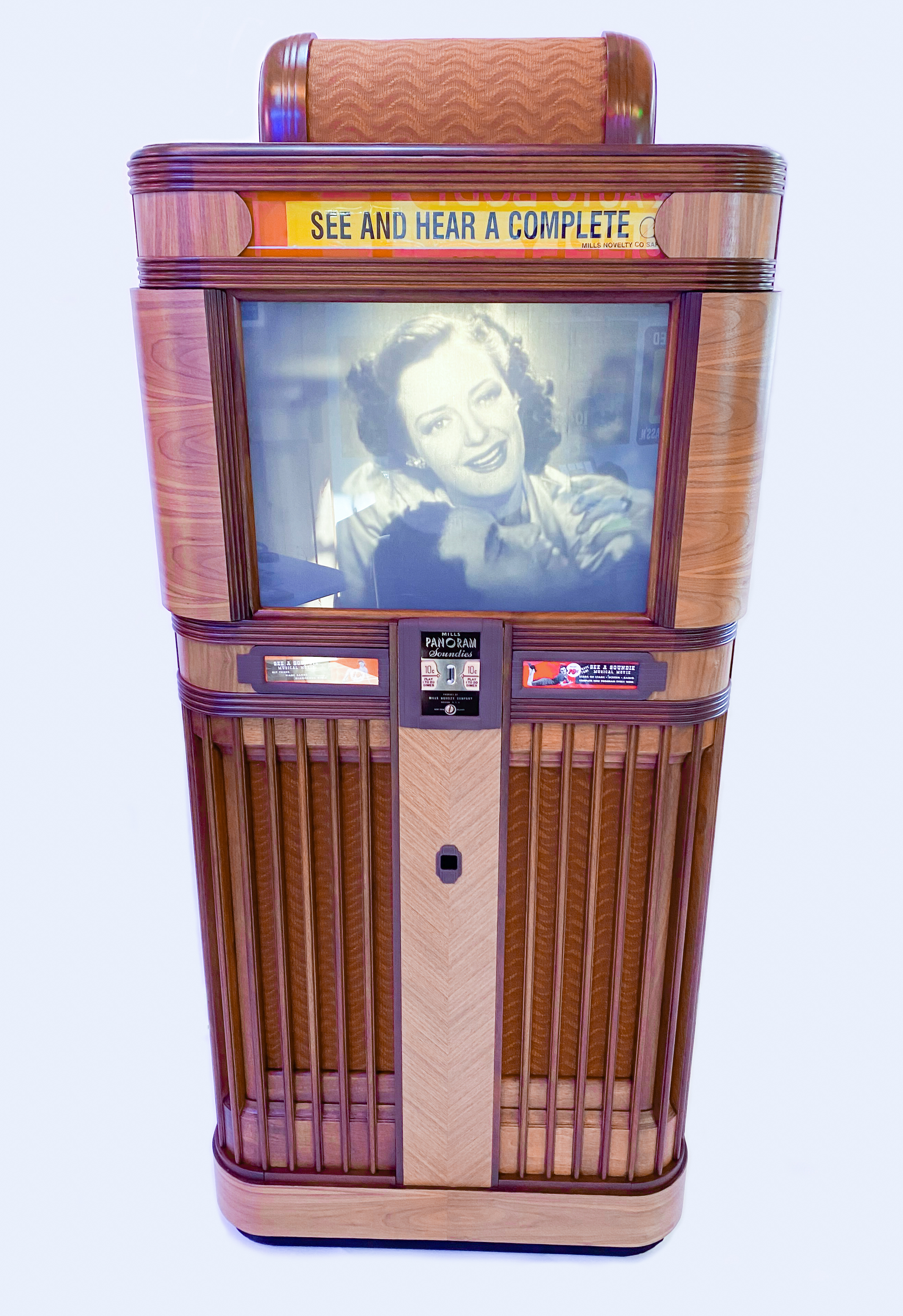
Soundies were made for projection on the Mills Panoram jukebox

A soundie is a short American film displaying both the audio and video of a musical performance. Over 1,850 soundies were produced between 1939 to 1947, regarded today as "precursors to music videos". Soundies exhibited a variety of musical genres in an effort to draw a broad audience.

The shorts were originally viewed in public places on some 5,000 "Panorams", coin-operated, 16mm rear-projection machines built by the Mills Novelty Company of Chicago. Panorams offered multiple selections of a constantly changing rotation of soundies, and were typically located in public venues like nightclubs, bars, amusement centers, and restaurants. As World War II progressed, soundies also featured patriotic messages and advertisements for war bonds. Hollywood films were censored but soundies weren't, so the films occasionally had daring content like burlesque acts; these were produced to appeal to soldiers on leave.

== Technology ==
Soundies were filmed professionally on black-and-white 35mm theatrical motion picture stock, but were printed on the more portable and economical 16mm film.

The Panoram "movie jukebox" was manufactured by the Mills Novelty Company of Chicago. Each rear-projection Panoram housed a 16mm RCA film projector, with eight soundies films threaded in an endless-loop arrangement. A system of mirrors flashed the image from the lower half of the cabinet onto a front-facing screen in the top half. Because of the mirror arrangement, the films had to be printed with the image "flipped" (with the titles appearing backwards on the screen). Each film cost 10 cents to play, with no choice of song; the patron saw whatever film was next in the queue. Panorams could be found in public amusement centers, nightclubs, taverns, restaurants, and factory lounges, and the films were changed weekly. The completed soundies were generally made available within a few weeks of their filming, by the Soundies Distributing Corporation of America.

Several production companies filmed the soundies shorts in New York City, Hollywood, and Chicago: James Roosevelt's Globe Productions (1939–41), Cinemasters (1940–41), Minoco Productions (owned by Mills Novelty, 1941–43), RCM Productions (1941–46), LOL Productions (1943), Glamourettes (1943), Filmcraft Productions (1943–47), and Alexander Productions (1947) led by William D. Alexander). The performers recorded the music in advance, and mimed to the soundtrack during filming.

== Competition ==
The movie-jukebox idea developed several imitations and variations of the technical design; the most successful of these imitators were the Techniprocess company (managed by Rudy Vallee) and the Featurettes company, which used original novelty songs and usually unknown talent (such as a 17-year-old Gwen Verdon, appearing as "Gwen Verdun"). As soundies quickly gained most of the market for jukebox films, the other companies disbanded, and some sold their films to the Soundies concern.

== Musical genres ==
Soundies emphasized variety from their beginning; the first three bandleaders who contracted for soundies were boogie-woogie specialist Will Bradley, established popular music maestro Vincent Lopez, and Hawaiian singer-leader Ray Kinney. Soundies displayed all genres of music, from classical to big-band swing, and from hillbilly novelties to patriotic songs. Jimmy Dorsey, Louis Jordan, Spike Jones, Stan Kenton, Kay Starr, Johnnie Johnston, Les Brown, The Hoosier Hot Shots, Charlie Spivak, Martha Tilton, Gene Krupa, Anita O'Day, Jimmie Dodd, Merle Travis, and Lawrence Welk were some of the leading soundies performers. Many soundies artists were show-business veterans, like Benny Fields, Gus Van, Cliff Edwards, Ann Pennington, Sally Rand, Harry McClintock, Nick Lucas, and Patricia Ellis. Many stars of the future made appearances in soundies at the beginning of their careers, including Gale Storm, Dorothy Dandridge, Ricardo Montalbán, Liberace, Doris Day, Gloria Grahame, Cyd Charisse, Alan Ladd, Marilyn Maxwell, and Yvonne DeCarlo.

Many nightclub and recording artists also made soundies, including Harry "The Hipster" Gibson, Frances Faye, Gloria Parker, Charles Magnante, and Milton DeLugg. In the mid-1940s, during a moratorium imposed by James Petrillo of the musicians' union, Soundies resorted to filming nonmusical vaudeville acts, featuring exotic dancers Sally Rand and Faith Bacon, animal acts, roller-skating exhibitions, acrobats, impressionists, and jugglers.

Beginning in 1941, Soundies experimented with expanding its format, and filmed comedy soundies with Our Gang actor Carl "Alfalfa" Switzer, Broadway comic Willie Howard, dialect comedians Smith and Dale, Harry Langdon, Snub Pollard, and The Keystone Cops. Most of these films were nonmusical, and were not as well received as the musical soundies. Soundies abandoned the comedy-sketch idea, but continued to produce filmed versions of comic novelty songs.

Some bandleaders recognized the promotional value of soundies. Will Bradley, Vincent Lopez, and Ray Kinney were the first, as has been mentioned, and Ozzie Nelson, Cab Calloway, Louis Armstrong, Lawrence Welk, and Louis Jordan followed. The most prolific soundies bandleaders were Johnny Long (18 titles) and Stan Kenton (17 titles); cowboy entertainer "Red River Dave" McEnery was almost as prolific (14 titles).

More than 1,800 soundies minimusicals were made, many of which have been released on home video. The soundies films were regularly described and reviewed in the entertainment and music trade publications, such as Billboard.

== Wartime impact ==
During their first year, the soundies made millions of dollars. However, in late 1941, the federal government restricted the use of rubber and precious metals, prioritizing these resources for military use during wartime. This meant that Mills Novelty could no longer build and sell Panoram machines, and had to confine its activities to keeping the existing projectors supplied with films. Soundies became strictly a production company, dedicated to making its own musical shorts.

== Eclipse ==
The Soundies Distributing Corporation of America remained active until 1947. With commercial television developing rapidly, the Soundies machines and films became obsolete. Almost all of the Panoram jukeboxes were either junked or modified into self-service "peepshow" machines. Most remaining Panorams are in the hands of collectors and are occasionally offered for sale.

The library of approximately 1,800 soundies films was made available first to home-movie companies Castle Films and Official Films, then to television via Official's TV division, and ultimately to home video (via England's Charly Records, which acquired the Official prints and negatives). The trade publication Billboard reported in February 1951 that Official Films had spent $300,000 preparing the Soundies film library for television syndication, under the series title "Music Hall Varieties"; Official earned more than $700,000 from local TV stations.

== Documentaries ==
Three documentaries have been produced about soundies. Don McGlynn produced and edited The Soundies in 1986, hosted by Cab Calloway; the film was broadcast nationally on PBS. Dewey Russell compiled an hourlong, direct-to-video history, Soundies: Music Video from the '40s in 1987, narrated by Michael Sollazzo. Chris Lamson produced Soundies: A Musical History, hosted by Michael Feinstein, in 2007 for PBS.

== Legacy ==
For today's filmmakers and archivists, soundies are known for preserving rare performances of African-American artists who had fewer opportunities to perform in mainstream films. Such artists as The Ink Spots, Fats Waller, Duke Ellington, Louis Jordan, Sister Rosetta Tharpe, Dorothy Dandridge, Big Joe Turner, Bob Howard, Billy Eckstine, Count Basie, The Mills Brothers, Herb Jeffries, Cab Calloway, Meade Lux Lewis, Lena Horne, Louis Armstrong, Nat King Cole, and Stepin Fetchit all made soundies (several of these were excerpted from longer theatrical films).

The 1942 soundie Jam Session with Duke Ellington was added to the National Film Registry in 2001.

== Later forms ==
The soundies concept was revived in 1951 by producer Louis D. Snader. Radio stations relied on transcriptions—recorded musical performances. Snader brought the idea to television with films, which he called "Snader Telescriptions." Snader hired dozens of pop-music acts and vaudeville performers, many of whom had already appeared in soundies, to star in his new films. Snader Telescriptions are often confused with soundies because of their similarity in length and personnel. Almost all of the Snader Telescriptions were in black-and-white, although a few Snader Telescriptions were made available in both color and black-and-white.

In 1958, the original Soundies "jukebox" concept was revived by French company Cameca as Scopitone. Similar to soundies, scopitones are short musical films designed to be played on a specially designed coin-operated jukebox, but with new technical improvements -- color and high-fidelity sound. Scopitones were printed on color 16mm film with magnetic sound, instead of soundies' black-and-white film with optical sound. By the mid-1960s, Scopitone jukeboxes had spread across England and the United States.

Singer and actress Debbie Reynolds formed a production company, Harmon-EE, with film executive Irving Briskin to supply films for Scopitone in America. These began production in 1965, and prints were made by Technicolor. Like soundies decades before, the new Scopitone machines were built in Chicago. The Scopitone machines were expensive -- $4,220 for the projector and 36 films -- and each film cost 25 cents to watch, but the franchise found success across the country in approximately 1,300 lounges and nightclubs. Unfortunately for Reynolds, some of the behind-the-scenes financing in America came from underworld sources, leading to financial mismanagement and federal investigations, and the entire enterprise ground to a halt in 1969.
