= Panoram =

1940s visual jukebox

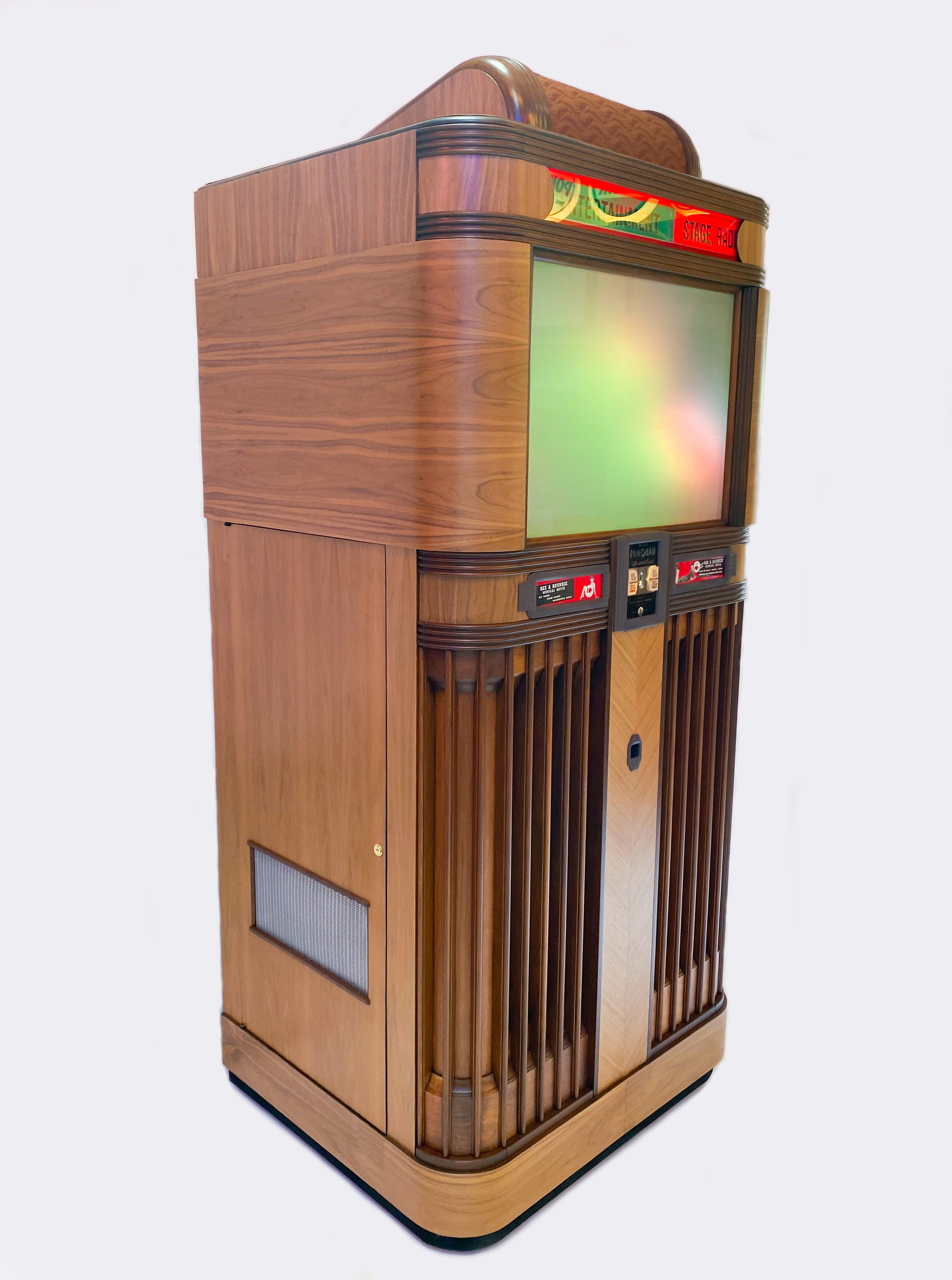
Exterior of a Mills Panoram

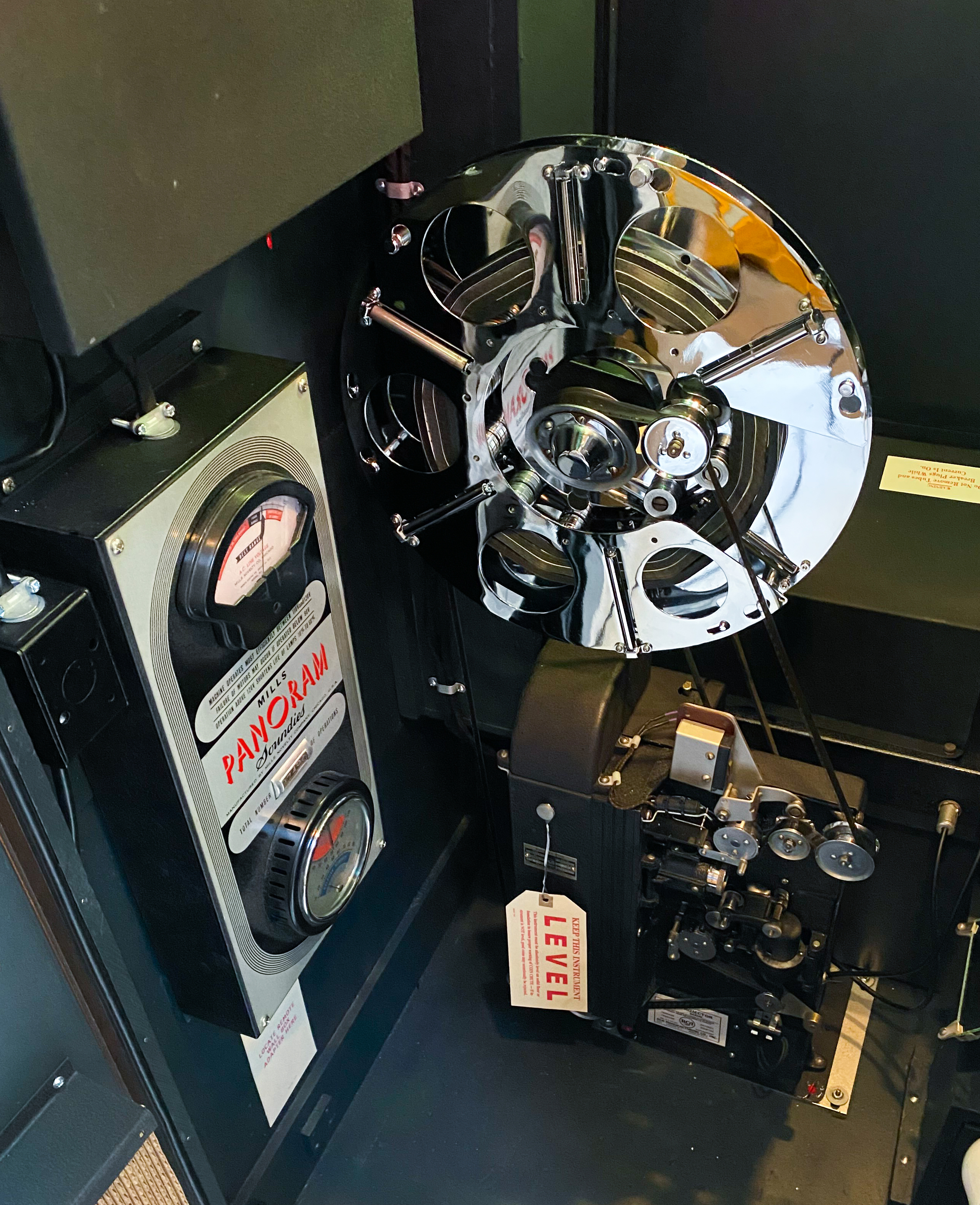
Interior of a Mills Panoram

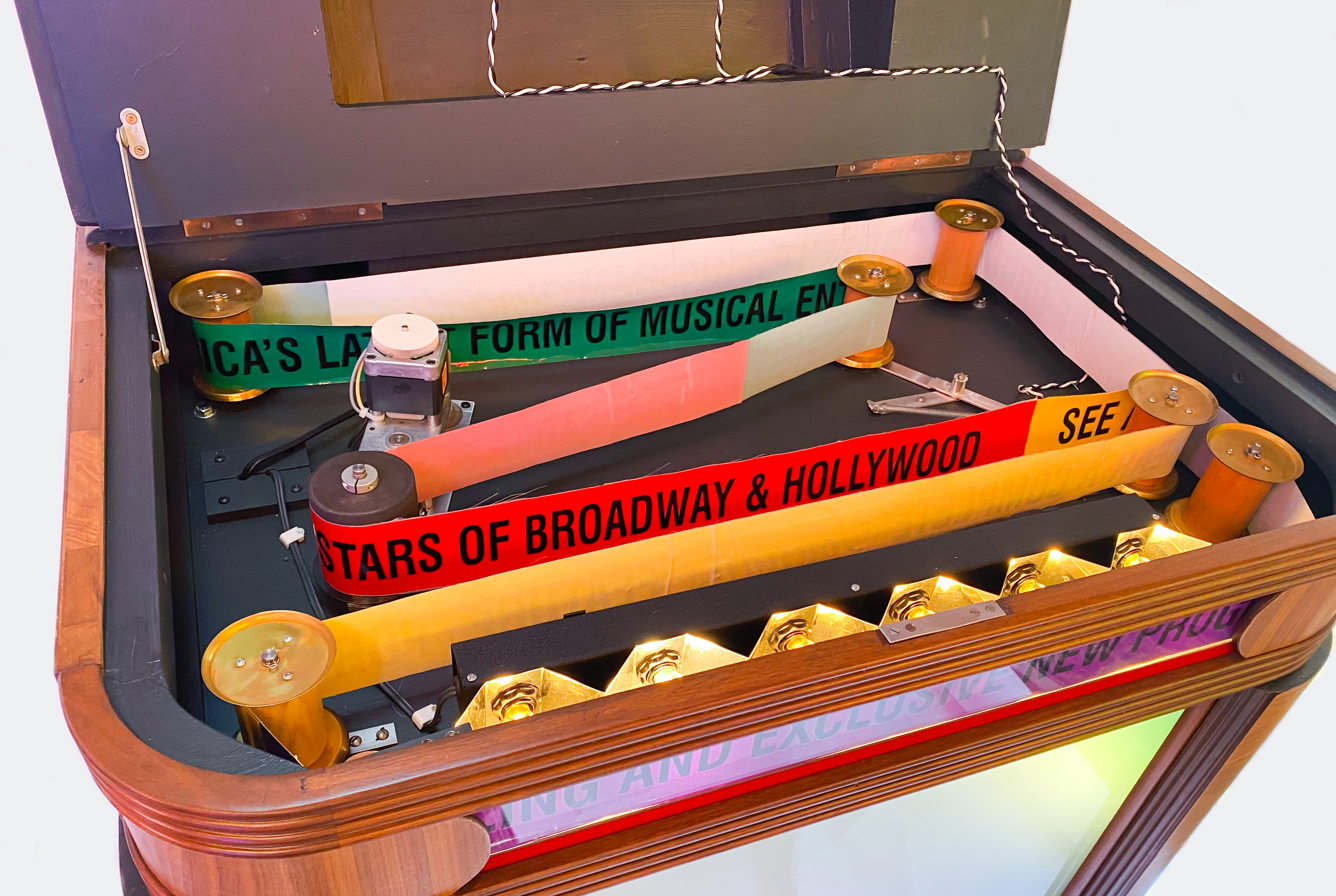
Top Advertising Banner on a Panoram

The Panoram is a coin-operated jukebox produced by the Mills Novelty Company of Chicago that played short musical films known as soundies, historic precursors to the modern music video. Reaching their greatest popularity in the United States during the 1940s, soundies featured both audio and video, with Panorams offering multiple selections of a constantly changing rotation of shorts. In all, over 1,850 soundies were made, and approximately 5,000 Panorams were built before their end of production in the late 1940s.

== History ==
The Panoram was conceived and produced by the Mills Novelty Company of Chicago under several patents, including 123,473 and 2,286,200, which involve the cabinet design and endless reel workings. Development took place in the late 1930s with production and sales beginning in 1940. A Grand Premiere took place on September 16-19, 1941, in Hollywood, California. The company wrote over $3 million in Panoram orders that week. The Panoram used RCA projectors, amplifiers, and speakers. The successful launch of the Panoram allowed for the largest single order of these RCA products up to that time.

A Panoram measured 82 in (210 cm) tall by 36 in (91 cm) wide by 32 in (81 cm) deep, and employed a series of mirrors to reflect the image from a projector onto a 27-inch (69 cm), rear-projection, ground-glass screen in a tight, enclosed cabinet. Costing $1,000 to end-use locations (or $695 to regional distributors), the popular machines found their way into countless soda shops, taverns, bus and train stations, and other public places across America. The specially made 16 mm films ran in a continuous loop and stopped when a notch cut at the end of each film tripped a microswitch, engaging a step-back relay. The patron could put up to twenty dimes in the machine at a time. However, the Panoram had no selector mechanism, so there was no choice of film title. The patron would see whatever film was next in the queue. The Panoram mechanics were housed in an Art Deco design, high-quality wood cabinet. This cabinet included an advertising banner located at the top of the unit. This banner rotated through a series of rollers, driven by a motor, and was backlit. Color cylinders also rotated behind the screen creating colored flashes on the screen while the unit was not being played. When a patron inserted a dime, power to both the banner and colored lights was interrupted and power was applied to the projector and amplifier, thereby initiating play.

With the beginning of World War II, production of the Panoram machines was drastically reduced due to a wartime shortage of raw materials, and the Mills Panoram's 1940 success started to fade. Soundies (the 16mm media used in the Panoram) continued to be produced and distributed to Panoram locations until 1947. By then, the novelty of the visual jukebox was compromised owing to the availability of the television. Panoram machines were repurposed as educational film-playing units or, more commonly, as adult peep shows. The latter caused the introduction of regulation of Panorams to control placement of the units in many cities.

The Panoram is now best known for the vast library of short, three-minute music videos that were created for it. Called Soundies, these films featured many of the great musical stars of the period, including Duke Ellington, Count Basie, and Cab Calloway. Most of the approximately 1800 Soundies films survive and are considered a priceless archive of 1940s popular music and performers. The Soundies films were printed backwards (mirror image) so that they would appear in a correct orientation when played in a Panoram machine. Several of the short films were wound on a roll and delivered to Panoram-hosted locations as replacement media. In this manner, new Soundies could be viewed at the location and the entertainment would remain fresh. Many Soundies can be viewed on YouTube today, including some by bandleader Al Donahue, who made 7 or 8 of the first Soundies at Radio City Music Hall.

The basic concept behind the Panoram would be revived in the early 1960s with the Scopitone.
