= Video Jukebox (TV series) =

- Logo
- Starring: Various
- Country of origin: United States

Production
- Running time: Varied

Original release
- Network: HBO
- Release: December 1978 – December 5, 1986

Video Jukebox is an American television program that aired on HBO from 1978 to 1986. It is a monthly series that showcased music videos from the popular recording artists of the time such as Duran Duran, Michael Jackson, Prince, Culture Club, Linda Ronstadt, David Bowie, Bow Wow Wow, Kim Wilde, Hall & Oates, Madonna, Blondie, Rush, and the Human League. A typical episode of Video Jukebox consisted of seven or eight music videos and lasted roughly 30 minutes, and the lineup changed in the middle of each month.

During the late 1970s (and before the MTV network debuted), HBO was already airing one or two music videos (or "promotional clips" as they were known at the time) as filler in between their feature films and other series. These short clips also carried the Video Jukebox moniker. When Video Jukebox premiered as a half-hour series in December 1981, HBO was reaching more households than MTV (which had been launched only four months earlier), so for about a year until MTV caught up to HBO's subscriber count, a video that aired on Video Jukebox may have received more exposure there than it would on MTV.

The series had no host until September 1985, when Dennis Elsas was brought on as voiceover talent, introducing the videos that were shown on the program. Elsas served as host of Video Jukebox until its final airing on December 5, 1986.

At the peak of its popularity in the mid-1980s, Video Jukebox spawned many "special editions", including Christmas Jukebox, Country Jukebox, Comedy Jukebox, Heavy Metal Jukebox, Sixties Jukebox, and other editions featuring songs from movies and Grammy winners.
