= Cinebox =

Coin-operated film projector jukebox

The Cinebox was a coin-operated Italian 16mm film projector jukebox type machine invented in 1959 that appeared in Europe to rival the French made Scopitone that appeared in 1960. The Cinebox was manufactured in Rome by Ottico Meccanica Italiana.

In 1963 it appeared in the USA and was retitled Colorama in 1965. In 1961 Cinebox machines were placed on ocean liners of the American Export Lines with Cineboxes showing cartoons and short subject comedies in on board nurseries whilst on board lounges showed musical and travelogues. Each of the Cineboxes held five 40 minute films.

In the United States the Cinebox musical juke box provided three minutes of sound film for 25 cents with 40 titles available at a time on the machine.

In Canada, the Cinebox became the first e.commerce website (cinebox.net), founded by Loïc Berthout, to sell movies (DVD) online in 1998. It then proposed video games and reached an international scope. It was also selling through cinebox.com until 2010.
