= Scopitone =

French 16mm color film video jukebox of the 1960s

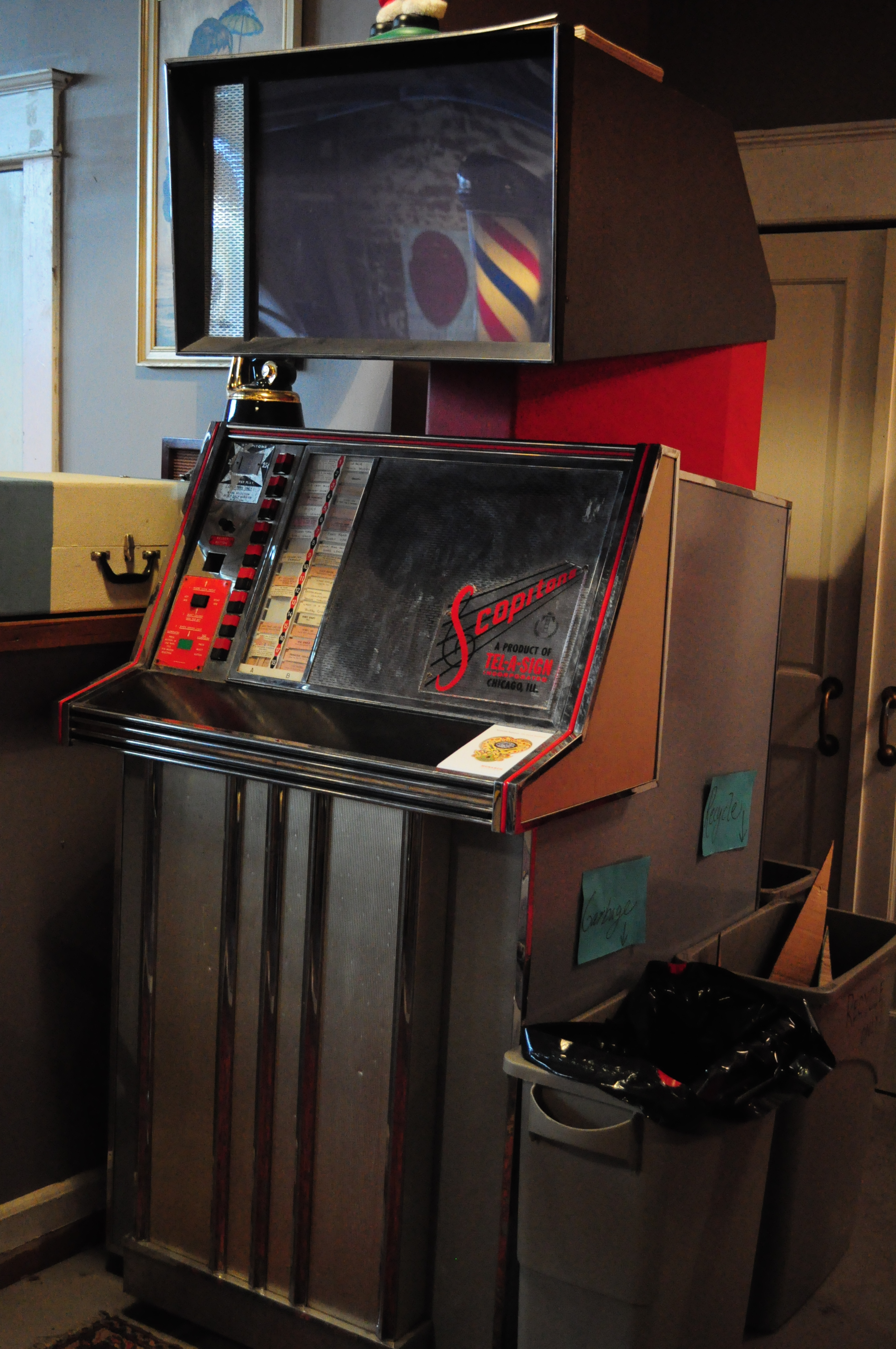
Scopitone machine

Scopitone is a type of jukebox featuring a 16 mm film component. Scopitone films were a forerunner of music videos. The 1959 Italian Cinebox/Colorama and Color-Sonics were competing, lesser-known technologies of the time one year before the Scopitone in France.

Based on Soundies technology developed during World War II, color 16 mm film shorts with a magnetic soundtrack were designed to be shown in a specially designed jukebox. The difference between the Panoram and the Scopitone jukebox was that with Panoram the 16mm films were black and white with optical sound and there was no selection among the 8 short films in the jukebox, whereas Scopitone featured color (in the US produced films Technicolor), with Hi-Fi magnetic soundtracks, with selection available between all 36 Scopitone films in the Scopitone jukebox. Scopitone films, like Soundies, featured recordings that performers lip synced to, with at least one exception; Billy Lee Riley was recorded live performing the song "High Heel Sneakers" in his Scopitone.

Between 1940 and 1946, three-minute musical films called Soundies (produced in New York City, Chicago and Hollywood) were displayed on a Panoram, the first coin-operated film jukebox or machine music. These were set up in nightclubs, bars, restaurants and amusement centers.

After 2005, the word 'Scopitone' was dedicated as a name for type of music video which is highlighted on musicians, playback artists, and composers on screen. Composer and conductor James Horner first used the Scopitone name for his video as a remembrance of the Scopitone jukebox.

== History ==
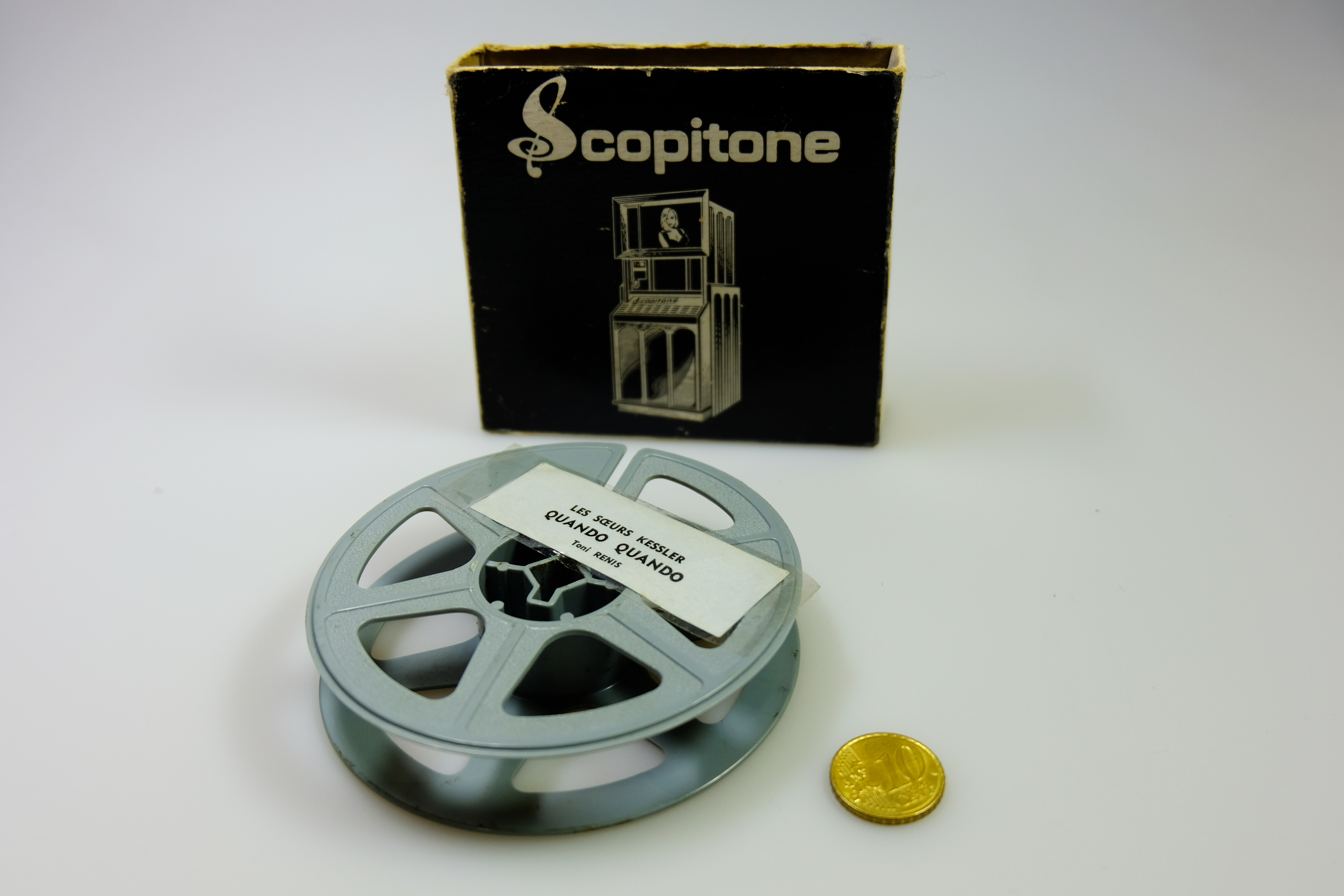
A Scopitone film spool

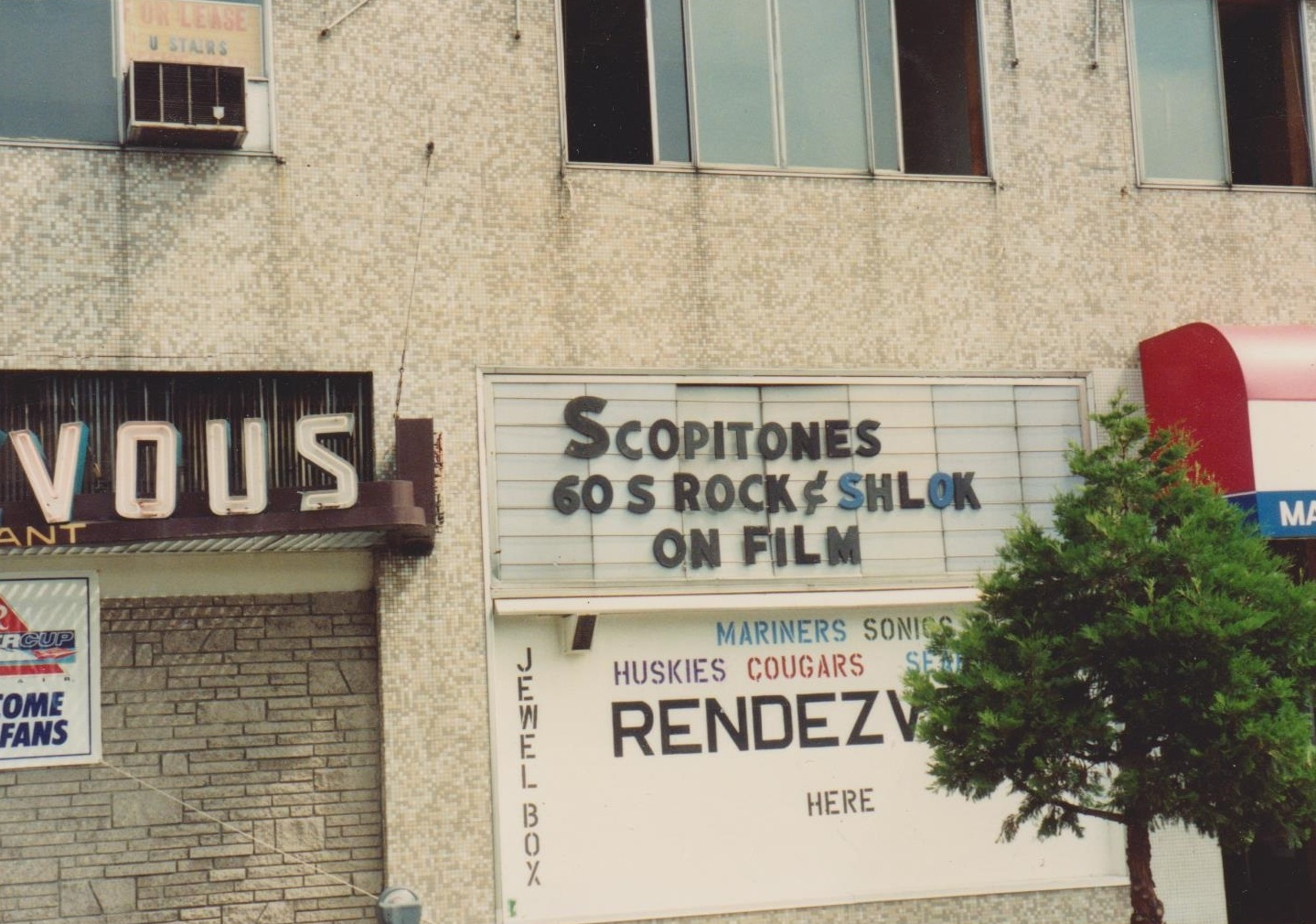
Jewelbox Scopitones 1990

The Scopitone was patented in 1958. The first Scopitones were made in France by a company called Cameca on boulevard Saint-Denis in Courbevoie, among them Serge Gainsbourg's "Le poinçonneur des Lilas" (filmed in 1958 in the Porte des Lilas Métro station), Johnny Hallyday's "Noir c'est noir" a French version of Los Bravos' "Black Is Black") and the "Hully Gully" showing a dance around a swimming pool.

Scopitones spread to West Germany, where the Kessler Sisters burst out of twin steamer trunks to sing "Quando Quando" on the dim screen that surmounted the jukebox. Scopitone went on to appear in bars in England, including a coffee bar in Swanage where "Telstar" was a favourite. By 1964, approximately 500 machines were installed in the United States, most of which were deliberately targeted at cocktail lounges and adult establishments, in part to avoid competition with the jukebox industry for the teen audience. By 1966, reportedly 800 machines were installed in bars and nightclubs in the US, at a cost of $3500 apiece. This, in turn, required production of new Scopitone films for the American audience, many of which were produced on contract with Debbie Reynolds's production company.

Several well-known acts of the 1960s appear in Scopitone films, ranging from the earlier part of the decade: The Exciters ("Tell Him"), Neil Sedaka ("Calendar Girl"), Freddy Cannon (“California Sun”) and Bobby Vee ("The Night Has a Thousand Eyes" and "Baby Face") and later 1960s acts such as Gary Lewis & the Playboys (“Little Miss Go-Go"), Tommy James & the Shondells (“Mony Mony”), Jody Miller ("The Race Is On" and her biggest hit "Queen of the House") and Procol Harum ("A Whiter Shade of Pale"). In one Scopitone recording, Dionne Warwick lay on a white shag rug with an offstage fan urging her to sing "Walk on By". Another had Nancy Sinatra and a troupe of go-go girls shimmy to "These Boots Are Made for Walkin'". Inspired by burlesque, blonde bombshell Joi Lansing performed "Web of Love" and "The Silencer", and Julie London sang "Daddy" against a backdrop of strippers. Mary "Dee Dee" Phelps of Dick and Dee Dee recalled in 2006 being asked to record a Scopitone for one of their more obscure records and not their biggest hit; when she saw the finished product, she was appalled by its disjointed appearance. The artifice of such scenes led Susan Sontag to identify Scopitone films as "part of the canon of Camp" in her 1964 essay "Notes on 'Camp'".

The medium's focus on adult audiences, and the resulting avoidance of or inability to lure the superstar American or British Invasion acts of the era, was a factor in its demise; for example, when The Beatles decided to enter the music video business in 1965, they opted to bypass the Scopitone and distribute their promotional films via television. Other factors included the declining taste and poor quality of the productions (particularly those made in the United States), changing taste toward psychedelic rock and a late 1960s sting that revealed that the Scopitone business had deep ties to the Sicilian Mafia.

Even though the popularity of the Scopitone had faded away by the end of the 1960s, the same concept was still in limited use throughout the 1970s by acts such as the Carpenters and ABBA, both of whose early productions were shot on 16mm film before transitioning to videotape. Toward the late 1960s, films produced for the rival Color-Sonic video jukebox were adapted to the Scopitone. The last official film for a Scopitone was made at the end of 1978.

In 1990, a selection of Scopitones was screened at the Jewel Box theater in Seattle by Dennis Nyback.

In 2006, French singer Mareva Galanter released several videos which mimic the Scopitone style. Galenta's album Ukuyéyé features several songs in the French Yé-yé style. She also recently hosted a weekly French television program called "Do you do you Scopitone" on the Paris Première channel.

As of 2012, one of the few Scopitones not in a museum or private collection in the United States is at Third Man Records in Nashville, Tennessee. Many Scopitone films have been released on DVD or made available on the internet.

The Enter Museum in Switzerland has one Scopitone on display.

== See also ==
- Panoram
- Cinebox
- Soundie
