= Keeping Our Love Warm =

Studio album by Captain & Tennille
- Released: October 1980
- Studio: Rumbo (Los Angeles)
- Genres: Pop, R&B
- Label: Casablanca
- Producer: Daryl Dragon

Captain & Tennille chronology
Make Your Move (1979)	Keeping Our Love Warm (1980)	More Than Dancing (1982)

Professional ratings
Review scores
Source	Rating
AllMusic	3/5 stars
Billboard	(Positive)

Keeping Our Love Warm is the sixth studio album by the American duo Captain & Tennille. Issued in 1980, it was their final full-length release recorded for Casablanca Records.

== Background ==
Keeping Our Love Warm was the last major album from the duo.

Of the nine tracks, Toni Tennille wrote five of the songs, one of which, a re-recorded version of "Gentle Stranger" (as Tennille had originally envisioned it), was originally featured on their 1975 debut album Love Will Keep Us Together.

The duo performed the title track in the 1980 Macy's Thanksgiving Day Parade.

"But I Think It's A Dream" was prominently featured in Grand Theft Auto VI: An Extended Look as part of the in-game soundtrack.

== Track listing ==
1. "Keepin' Our Love Warm" (Toni Tennille) - 2:55
2. "Until You Come Back to Me (That's What I'm Gonna Do)" (Morris Broadnax, Clarence Paul, Stevie Wonder) - 4:06
3. "Gentle Stranger" (Toni Tennille) - 3:58
4. "But I Think It's a Dream" (Toni Tennille) - 4:13
5. "Since I Fell for You" (Buddy Johnson) - 4:40
6. "Don't Forget Me" (Toni Tennille) - 3:05
7. "Song for My Father" (Horace Silver) - 6:19
8. "This Is Not the First Time" (Toni Tennille) - 4:09
9. "Your Good Thing (Is About to End)" (Isaac Hayes, David Porter) - 5:33

== Personnel ==
- Toni Tennille - acoustic piano, composer, Fender Rhodes, liner notes, vocal arrangement, vocals
- Daryl Dragon - producer, ARP Odyssey, ARP Omni, ARP String, bass guitar, clavinet, cover art concept, Yamaha CS-80, Fender Rhodes, Fender Telecaster, Moog bass, Oberheim synthesizer, percussion, acoustic piano, Roland synthesizer, tack piano, vibraphone
- John Beal - horn arrangements
- Melissa Boettner - background vocals
- Les Cooper & the Soul Rockers - engineers
- Jon Crosse - flute, tenor saxophone
- Paulinho Da Costa - congas, percussion, quica
- Dennis Dragon - mixing
- Paul Gross - graphic design
- Gary Heery - photography
- Rusty Higgins - flute, horn arrangements, alto and soprano saxophones, soloist
- Carolisa Lindberg - cello
- Steve Nelson Quartet - bass
- Ira Newborn - guitar
- Lenard Ruth - background vocals
- Steve Schaeffer - drums
- Bill Severance - drums
- Frederick Seykora - cello
- Gary Wasserman - trombone
- Roger Young - engineer, mixing
