= Can't Stop Dancin' (Captain & Tennille song) =

Single by Captain & Tennille

from the album Come In from the Rain
- B-side: "Mis Canciones (The Good Songs)"
- Released: February 1977
- Genre: Pop
- Length: 3:50
- Label: A&M
- Songwriters: John Pritchard Jr., Ray Stevens
- Producer: Daryl Dragon

Captain & Tennille singles chronology
"Muskrat Love" (1976)	"Can't Stop Dancin'" (1977)	"Come In from the Rain" (1977)

"Can't Stop Dancin" is a song written by John Pritchard Jr. and Ray Stevens, which became a Top 40 hit for Captain and Tennille in early 1977. It was the first single released from their third studio album, Come In from the Rain.

The lyrics speak of music as being reflective of the "rhythm of the universe". Dancing is the best way to respond to that rhythm, indicating the need for resilience in order to adjust to the vicissitudes of life.

Record World said it "has a gospel/rock flavor with Toni's vocal and Daryl's keyboards making a strong case for yet another hit."

== Chart performance ==
"Can't Stop Dancin'" reached number 13 on the US Billboard Hot 100 chart and number 11 in Canada on the RPM Top singles chart. It charted slightly higher on the Adult Contemporary charts of both nations. It became their first single (excluding "Por Amor Viviremos"—the Spanish version of "Love Will Keep us Together"—and the title track to their album "Song of Joy") to miss the Top 10 on the Billboard Hot 100, and the duo's first major release single not to earn a gold record. "Can't Stop Dancin'" marked a decline in the fortunes of The Captain and Tennille as the duo's next three singles ("Come in from the Rain", "Circles", and "I'm on my Way") all missed the top 40 entirely—the duo did return to the top 10 later in 1978 with "You Never Done It Like That".

=== Weekly charts ===
Chart (1977)	Peak position
Australia (KMR)	67
Canada RPM Top Singles	11
Canada RPM Adult Contemporary	10
US Billboard Hot 100	13
US Billboard Adult Contemporary	12

=== Year-end charts ===
Chart (1977)	Rank
Canada	112
US	104

== Popular culture ==
- In 1980, Toni Tennille performed "Can't Stop Dancin'" on her talk show, The Toni Tennille Show.
