= Sedaka's Back =

Compilation album by Neil Sedaka
- Released: November 1974
- Genre: Pop
- Length: 45:18
- Label: Rocket
- Producers: Neil Sedaka and Robert Appère, Neil Sedaka and 10cc

Neil Sedaka chronology
Live at the Royal Festival Hall (1974)	Sedaka's Back (1974)	Overnight Success/The Hungry Years (1975)

Professional ratings
Review scores
Source	Rating
AllMusic	4.5/5 stars
Christgau's Record Guide	B+

Sedaka's Back is a compilation album by American singer-songwriter Neil Sedaka. The record, composed of selections from his previous three albums, which had been released only in the UK, was released on Elton John's label, the Rocket Record Company, in 1974. Three singles were released from this album: "Laughter in the Rain" (a No. 1 hit), "The Immigrant" (dedicated to John Lennon) and "That's When the Music Takes Me." The latter two songs were both Top 30 hits. Also included were songs that were turned into hits by other artists: "Solitaire" (the Carpenters) and "Love Will Keep Us Together" (the Captain & Tennille). The album reached No. 23 on the US Billboard album charts and was certified Gold for shipping half a million sales.

== Track listing ==
All songs written by Neil Sedaka and Phil Cody, except where noted.

Side one
No.	Title	Writer(s)	Length
1.	"Standing on the Inside"	Sedaka	3:59
2.	"That's When the Music Takes Me"	Sedaka	3:38
3.	"Laughter in the Rain"		2:50
4.	"Sad Eyes"		3:43
5.	"Solitaire"		5:03
6.	"Little Brother"		3:30

Side two
No.	Title	Writer(s)	Length
1.	"Love Will Keep Us Together"	Sedaka, Howard Greenfield	3:39
2.	"The Immigrant"		4:24
3.	"The Way I Am"		3:53
4.	"The Other Side of Me"	Sedaka, Greenfield	3:39
5.	"A Little Lovin'"		2:57
6.	"Our Last Song Together"	Sedaka, Greenfield	4:03

== Source of tracks ==
- Tracks 1, 6, 7, 10 and 12 from the album The Tra-La Days Are Over (1973)
- Tracks 2 and 5 from the album Solitaire (1972)
- Tracks 3, 4, 8, 9 and 11 from the album Laughter in the Rain (1974)

== US single releases ==
- "Standing on the Inside" saw a single release as the B-side of "That's When the Music Takes Me"; however, the version of "Standing on the Inside" heard on the single is a different version from the album version.
- "That's When the Music Takes Me" was released as a single in 1974 and reached No. 27 on the Billboard Hot 100 in 1975.
- "Laughter in the Rain" was released in 1974 and reached No. 1 on the Adult Contemporary charts in 1974 and No. 1 on the Billboard Hot 100 in 1975.
- "The Immigrant" was released as a single in 1974 and scored a No. 22 on the Billboard Hot 100 and a No. 1 on the Adult Contemporary charts in 1975.

Many of the other songs on this album saw singles releases in the UK and throughout Europe.

== Personnel ==
- Neil Sedaka – organ, piano, keyboards, vocals, clavinet, vibraphone
- Ben Benay – guitar
- Eric Stewart – guitar, backing vocals, engineer
- Lol Creme – guitars, backing vocals
- Kevin Godley – drums, percussion, backing vocals
- Graham Gouldman – bass, guitar, backing vocals
- Milt Holland – percussion
- Jim Horn – horn arrangements
- Dick Hyde – horn
- Danny Kortchmar – guitar
- Russ Kunkel – percussion, drums
- Don Menza – horn
- Del Newman – string arrangements
- Dean Parks – acoustic guitar, Dobro
- Brenda Russell – backing vocals
- Brian Russell – backing vocals
- Leland Sklar – bass
- William Smith – keyboards, backing vocals
- Chuck Findley – trumpet, horn, horn arrangements

== Certifications ==
Region	Certification	Certified units/sales
Canada (Music Canada)	Gold	50,000^{^}
United States (RIAA)	Gold	500,000^{^}
^{^} Shipments figures based on certification alone.
