= Rumbo Recorders =

Recording studio in Los Angeles, California, United States

Coordinates: 34.2084°N 118.5737°W

- Industry: Recording studio
- Founded: 1977
- Founder: Daryl Dragon; Toni Tennille
- Defunct: 2003
- Fate: Sold
- Successor: Metronome Studio
- Headquarters: Canoga Park, California, U.S.
- Number of locations: 1

Rumbo Recorders was a recording studio in the Canoga Park neighborhood of Los Angeles, California.

== History ==
In 1977, Daryl Dragon and Toni Tennille, the husband and wife team widely known as Captain & Tennille, began building the studio at 20215 Saticoy Street for their own private use following the success of their single "Love Will Keep Us Together". Dragon named the studio Rumbo Recorders after a toy elephant he named Rumbo when he was 5 years old, and was also the alias used by Dragon on Dennis Wilson's 1970 single "Sound of Free". The studio's entrance was appropriately flanked by a large pair of elephant statues.

After reassurance from Geordie Hormel at Village Recorder of the commercial viability of a studio, Dragon hired Rudi Breuer, who had done work at The Village, to complete Studio A. Rumbo Recorders opened in 1979. Studio A featured a 650 square foot control room outfitted with a 60-input Neve V Series recording console and two Studer A827 24-track multitrack recorders.

In the early 1980s, the studio expanded into a space vacated by a swimming pool supply company to build Studio B, whose design was inspired by Caribou Ranch, where Dragon & Tennille had visited while working with The Beach Boys in 1974. Studio B featured a 660 square foot control room, outfitted with a 40-input Trident 80C console. A decade later, Rumbo Studio B would be the inspiration for the design of John Mellencamp's own Belmont Mall Studio, The location of projects such as Guns N' Roses' Appetite for Destruction and The Spaghetti Incident?, as well as Slash's Snakepit's It's Five O'Clock Somewhere, Studio B is a favorite of Mike Clink, who particularly likes the room for tracking drums.

In 1991, Rumbo added Studio C for overdubs. Studio C featured a 650 square foot control room with a 32-input Trident 80 Series console. It also added two isolation booths. Tom Petty and the Heartbreakers recorded their album Into the Great Wide Open in Rumbo Studio C.

In 2003, citing massive changes in the recording industry, Dragon and Tennille sold Rumbo Recorders.

== Location ==
Rumbo's location in the West San Fernando Valley offered producers and artists a creative space away from the distractions of Hollywood, and factored into producer Mike Clink's choice of Rumbo Recorders for the recording of Guns N' Roses album, Appetite for Destruction.

== Notable artists ==
A number of notable artists recorded at Rumbo, including Guns N' Roses, Megadeth, Fleetwood Mac, Tom Petty and the Heartbreakers, Roy Orbison, Kiss, Stone Temple Pilots, REO Speedwagon, The Smashing Pumpkins, Blinker the Star, Mötley Crüe, John Mellencamp, No Doubt, Keb' Mo', Pink, Spinal Tap, Survivor, Maroon 5, and Ringo Starr.

== Selected list of albums recorded at Rumbo Recorders (by year) ==
- Captain & Tennille: Keeping Our Love Warm – 1980
- Survivor: Eye of the Tiger – 1982
- REO Speedwagon: Wheels Are Turnin' – 1984
- Dio: Sacred Heart – 1985
- Guns N' Roses: Appetite for Destruction – 1987
- Fleetwood Mac: Tango in the Night – 1987
- Megadeth: Rust In Peace – 1990
- Mr. Big: Lean into It - 1991
- Tom Petty and the Heartbreakers: Into the Great Wide Open – 1991
- Stone Temple Pilots: Core – 1992
- Bad Religion: Stranger Than Fiction – 1994
- UFO: Walk on Water – 1995
- Pure Rubbish: "Glamorous Youth" – 2001
- Maroon 5: Songs About Jane – 2002

== Producers and engineers associated with Rumbo Recorders ==
- Mike Clink
- Greg Droman
- Richard Dashut
