= The Other Side of Me =

The Other Side of Me may refer to:

- The Other Side of Me (Andy Williams album) or the title track, 1975
- "The Other Side of Me" (Neil Sedaka song), a 1976 song by Andy Williams
- The Other Side of Me, a 2008 album by Linda Eder
- "The Other Side of Me", a song from the album Hannah Montana by Miley Cyrus
- The Other Side of Me, a 2011 album by Enric Sifa
- The Other Side of Me (book), an autobiography by Sidney Sheldon
- "The Other Side of Me", a song by Gotthard from the 2005 album Lipservice
