= List of Billboard Easy Listening number ones of 1975 =

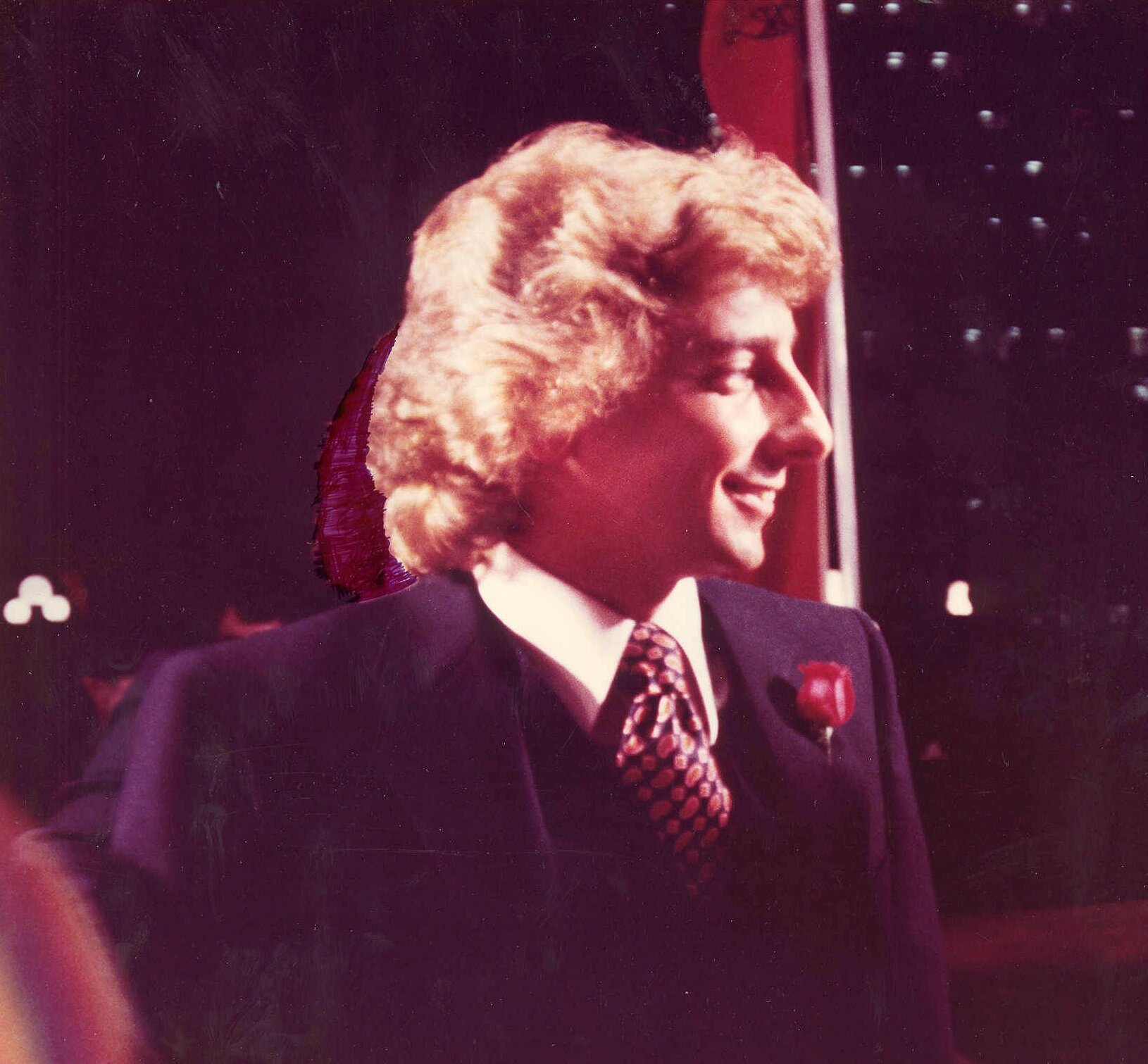
Barry Manilow had three number ones in 1975.

In 1975, Billboard magazine published a chart ranking the top-performing songs in the United States in the easy listening market. The chart, which in 1975 was entitled Easy Listening, has undergone various name changes and has been published under the title Adult Contemporary since 1996. In 1975, 42 songs topped the chart based on playlists submitted by radio stations and sales reports submitted by stores.

The first number one of the year was "Mandy" by Barry Manilow, which retained its position from the last chart of 1974. It held the top spot for only one week in 1975 before being replaced by Ringo Starr's recording of the 1950s song "Only You". Starr thus became the second former member of the Beatles to have an Easy Listening number one since the group's break-up, following Paul McCartney's success with "My Love" in 1973. Manilow was one of three acts to achieve three Easy Listening chart-toppers in 1975, along with Olivia Newton-John and the Carpenters. Newton-John had the highest total number of weeks at number one of any act, spending seven weeks in the top spot. She also recorded the longest unbroken run atop the chart, as her songs "Please Mr. Please" and "Something Better to Do" each spent three consecutive weeks at number one, the only tracks to do so during the year. Easy Listening chart-toppers by Manilow, Newton-John and the Carpenters also topped Billboard's pop singles chart, the Hot 100, reflecting the fact that at the time mellower styles were popular across a range of demographics and on top 40 radio as well as the easy listening format. Although it only topped the Easy Listening chart for a single week, Captain & Tennille's "Love Will Keep Us Together" was the biggest-selling single of 1975 in the United States.

Both "Rhinestone Cowboy" by Glen Campbell and "I'm Sorry" by John Denver were triple chart-toppers, as in addition to topping both the Easy Listening chart and the Hot 100, both songs also topped the Hot Country Songs listing. At the time, the rise of the smooth style of country music dubbed countrypolitan meant that there was considerable crossover between the country and easy listening radio formats. Campbell and Denver were among four acts to achieve two Easy Listening number ones in 1975, along with Captain & Tennille and Helen Reddy. Two other singers achieved two chart-toppers in different guises. Art Garfunkel topped the chart with his solo single "I Only Have Eyes for You" as well as with "My Little Town" with erstwhile singing partner Paul Simon. The song was an unexpected reunion for Simon & Garfunkel, who had not recorded together since 1970. Donny Osmond reached number one with "Morning Side of the Mountain", a duet with his sister Marie, and later returned to the top spot alongside his brothers in the group the Osmonds. "The Proud One" would prove to be the only Easy Listening chart-topper for the Osmonds, who had experienced major pop success earlier in the 1970s but had now passed their commercial peak. Glen Campbell's "Country Boy (You Got Your Feet in L.A.)" was the year's final number one.

== Chart history ==
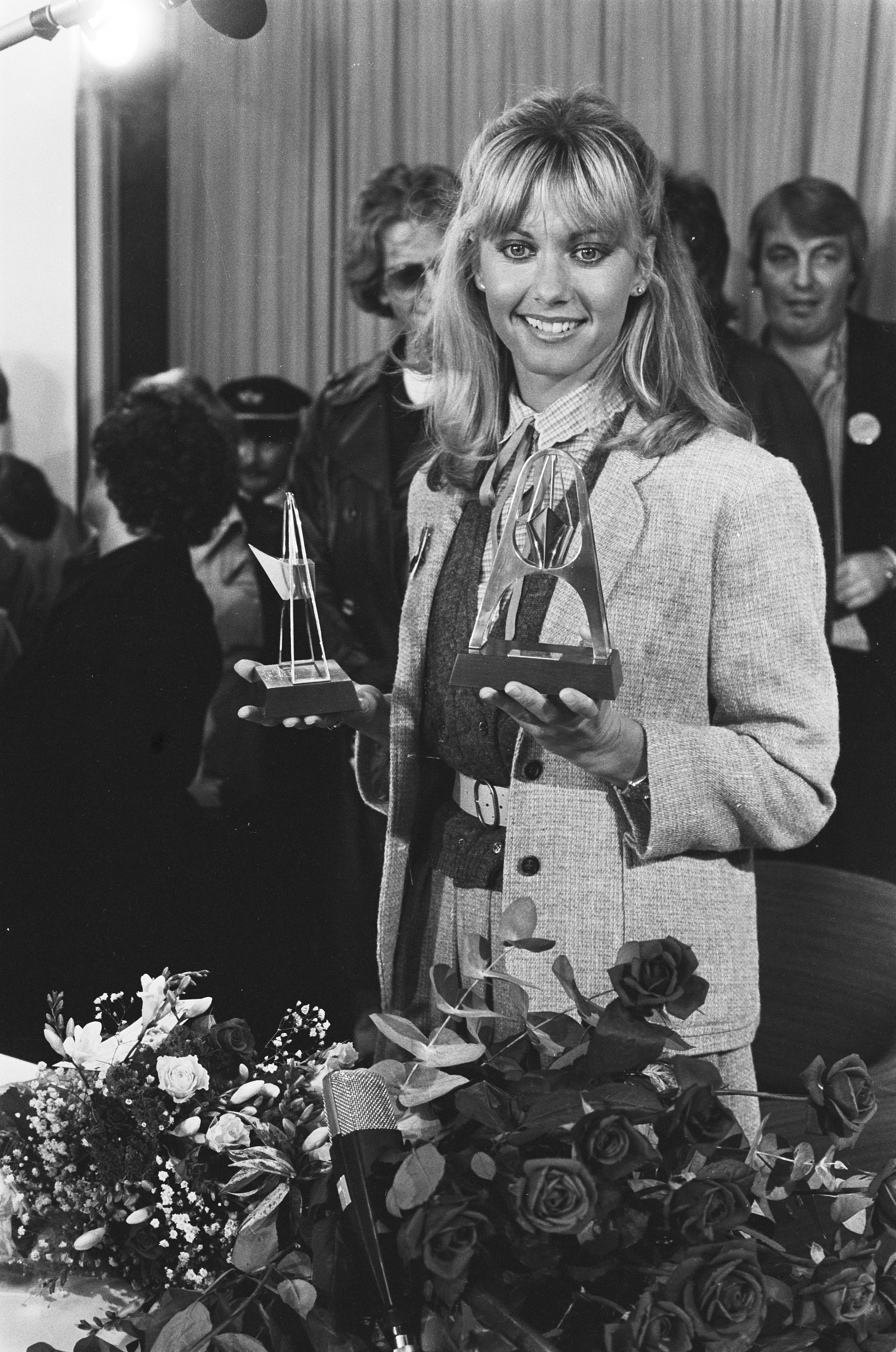
Olivia Newton-John spent seven weeks at number one, the most by any artist.

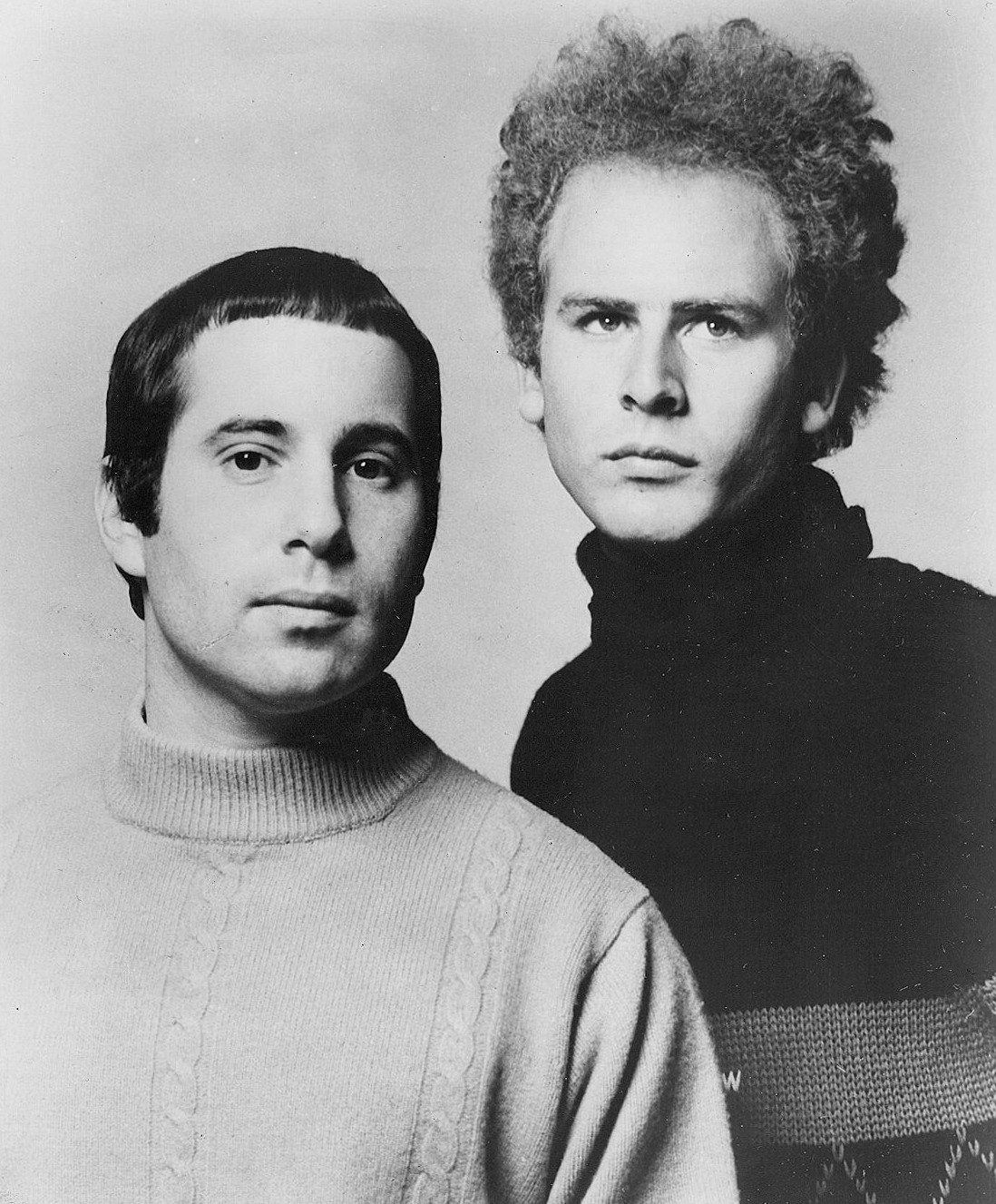
Simon & Garfunkel topped the chart with "My Little Town", a surprise reunion for the duo, who had been pursuing solo careers since 1970.

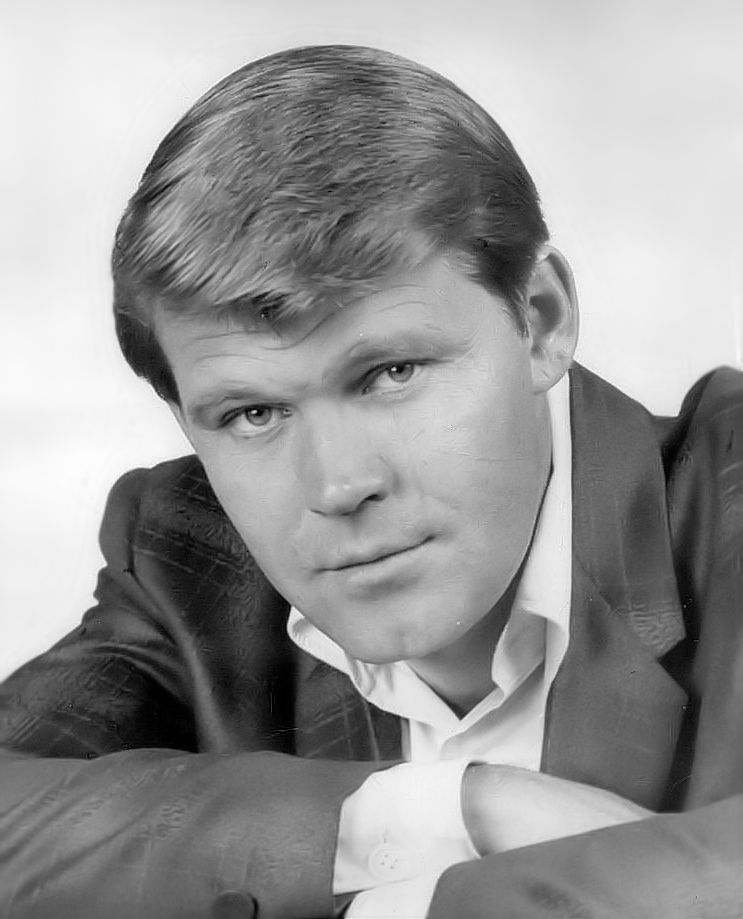
Glen Campbell had two chart-toppers and ended the year at number one.

Chart history
Issue date	Title	Artist(s)	Ref.
January 4	"Mandy"	Barry Manilow	
January 11	"Only You"	Ringo Starr	
January 18	"Please Mr. Postman"	The Carpenters	
January 25	"Morning Side of the Mountain"	Donny and Marie Osmond	
February 1	"Best of My Love"	Eagles	
February 8	"Sweet Surrender"	John Denver	
February 15	"Lonely People"	America	
February 22	"Nightingale"	Carole King	
March 1	"Poetry Man"	Phoebe Snow	
March 8	"Have You Never Been Mellow"	Olivia Newton-John	
March 15	"I've Been This Way Before"	Neil Diamond	
March 22	"(Hey Won't You Play) Another Somebody Done Somebody Wrong Song"	B. J. Thomas	
March 29	"Emotion"	Helen Reddy	
April 5	"My Boy"	Elvis Presley	
April 12	"The Last Farewell"	Roger Whittaker	
April 19	"He Don't Love You (Like I Love You)"	Tony Orlando and Dawn	
April 26	"It's a Miracle"	Barry Manilow	
May 3	"Only Yesterday"	The Carpenters	
May 10	"The Immigrant"	Neil Sedaka	
May 17	"Rainy Day People"	Gordon Lightfoot	
May 24	"99 Miles From L.A."	Albert Hammond	
May 31	"Wonderful Baby"	Don McLean	
June 7	"Love Will Keep Us Together"	Captain & Tennille	
June 14	"Wildfire"	Michael Murphey	
June 21	"Midnight Blue"	Melissa Manchester	
June 28	"Midnight Blue"	Melissa Manchester	
July 5	"Every Time You Touch Me (I Get High)"	Charlie Rich	
July 12	"Please Mr. Please"	Olivia Newton-John	
July 19	"Please Mr. Please"	Olivia Newton-John	
July 26	"Please Mr. Please"	Olivia Newton-John	
August 2	"Rhinestone Cowboy"	Glen Campbell	
August 9	"At Seventeen"	Janis Ian	
August 16	"At Seventeen"	Janis Ian	
August 23	"How Sweet It Is (To Be Loved by You)"	James Taylor	
August 30	"Fallin' in Love"	Hamilton, Joe Frank & Reynolds	
September 6	"Solitaire"	The Carpenters	
September 13	"The Proud One"	The Osmonds	
September 20	"I'm Sorry"	John Denver	
September 27	"I'm Sorry"	John Denver	
October 4	"Ain't No Way to Treat a Lady"	Helen Reddy	
October 11	"I Only Have Eyes for You"	Art Garfunkel	
October 18	"Something Better to Do"	Olivia Newton-John	
October 25	"Something Better to Do"	Olivia Newton-John	
November 1	"Something Better to Do"	Olivia Newton-John	
November 8	"The Way I Want to Touch You"	Captain & Tennille	
November 15	"The Way I Want to Touch You"	Captain & Tennille	
November 22	"My Little Town"	Simon & Garfunkel	
November 29	"My Little Town"	Simon & Garfunkel	
December 6	"Theme from Mahogany (Do You Know Where You're Going To)"	Diana Ross	
December 13	"I Write the Songs"	Barry Manilow	
December 20	"I Write the Songs"	Barry Manilow	
December 27	"Country Boy (You Got Your Feet in L.A.)"	Glen Campbell	

== See also ==
- 1975 in music
- List of artists who reached number one on the U.S. Adult Contemporary chart
