= Come In from the Rain (Captain & Tennille album) =

Studio album by Captain & Tennille
- Released: April 1977
- Studios: A&M (Hollywood); Larrabee (Los Angeles); Hold the Roll (Los Angeles); Village Recorders (Los Angeles)
- Genres: Pop, adult contemporary
- Length: 40:05
- Label: A&M
- Producer: Daryl Dragon

Captain & Tennille chronology
Song of Joy (1976)	Come In from the Rain (1977)	Dream (1978)

Professional ratings
Review scores
Source	Rating
AllMusic	2/5 stars

Come In from the Rain is the third studio album by Captain & Tennille. It peaked at No. 18 on the Billboard 200 on May 27, 1977. It spent a total of 15 weeks on the chart.

The album cover features the return of Daryl Dragon's and Toni Tennille's bulldogs, who were featured on their first album, Love Will Keep Us Together.

The chart performance of the album's three singles hinted at a decline in the duo's popularity. "Can't Stop Dancin'" was a hit at No. 13 on the Billboard Hot 100 (it failed to chart in the U.K.), but "Come In from the Rain" (originally recorded by Melissa Manchester on her album Better Days & Happy Endings) became the duo's first single in nearly two years to miss the Top 40, peaking at No. 61, and Tennille's self-written "Circles" failed to even "Bubble Under" the Hot 100, though the latter two were both top 10 Easy Listening hits.

Over exposure appeared to be a factor. Their previous five singles all went top 5 in the U.S. in 1975-1976. They hosted their own television variety series on ABC in 1976–77. They had only two more hits with "You Never Done it Like That" hitting in the U.S. Top 10 in 1978 and their second No. 1 in 1980 ("Do That to Me One More Time").

== Track listing ==
Side one

1. "Come In from the Rain" (Carole Bayer Sager, Melissa Manchester) - 4:36
2. "Sad Eyes" (Neil Sedaka, Phil Cody) - 3:46
3. "Let Mama Know" (Howard Greenfield, Neil Sedaka) - 4:00
4. "Easy Evil" (Alan O'Day) - 5:32
5. "Can't Stop Dancin'" (John Pritchard Jr., Ray Stevens) - 3:50

Side two

1. "Don't Be Scared" (Bruce Johnston) - 3:35
2. "Circles" (Toni Tennille) - 2:34
3. "Ladybug" (James Stein) - 3:32
4. "Happier Than the Morning Sun" (Stevie Wonder) - 3:19
5. "Ka-Ding-Dong" (Ronnie Jordan) - 2:32
6. "We Never Really Say Goodbye" (Daryl Dragon, Toni Tennille) - 2:18

== Personnel ==
- Guitar: Dan Ferguson. Banjo: Daryl Dragon
- Bass: Daryl Dragon
- Keyboards: Daryl Dragon, Toni Tennille
- Drums: Hal Blaine
- Percussion: Mike Mathis
- Saxophone, clarinet: Dave Edwards
- Trombone: Bob Havens
- Trumpet: Graham Young
- Backing vocals: Andy Boettner, Myrna Matthews, Gene Morford,
  Gary Sims, Jubilant Sykes, Louisa Tennille, Melissa Tennille
- Concertmaster: James Getzoff
