= More Than Dancing =

Studio album by Captain & Tennille
- Released: 1982
- Genre: Pop
- Label: Wizard Records (re-released by Raven Records)

Captain & Tennille chronology
Keeping Our Love Warm (1980)	More Than Dancing (1982)	The Secret of Christmas (2007)

More Than Dancing is the seventh studio album by Captain and Tennille. The album was released on a now-defunct Australian record label, Wizard Records. Following the five years of international success between A&M Records and Casablanca Records, Captain & Tennille had essentially concluded their major recording career in 1980 with the album Keeping Our Love Warm. The following year, Wizard Records invested in Captain & Tennille to record More Than Dancing. When released in 1982, the album had limited Australian release and was not released internationally. The album was considered extremely rare until the CD re-release in 2003.

In 2003, the Australian record label, Raven Records, purchased the rights and re-released the album on CD and retitled it to More Than Dancing ...Much More. An alternate album cover was used from the original photoshoot, where Tennille and Dragon are facing the camera rather than each other. The re-release includes the original 1982 tracks, as well as 11 unreleased tracks recorded from the 1980s up to 1995.

== 1982 tracks from More Than Dancing ==
1. "Don't Call It Love" (Tom Snow, Dean Pitchford) 3.00
2. "Let's Visit Heaven Tonight" (Bruce Johnston) 3.02
3. "Fire Away" (Miner) 3.38
4. "Feels Like More Than Dancing" (Chater, Dahlstrom) 3.30
5. "Tango" (Hartman, Sabatino) 3.43
6. "Davey I Misbehave" (Toni Tennille) 3.45
7. "Don't Let Love Go" (Russell) 3.49
8. "Heartbeat" (Cochran, Miner, Royner) 2.57
9. "I Must Be In Love" (Hirsch, Mueller) 3.32
10. "Come To Me" (Bobby Caldwell, Cari) 4.07

=== 2003 CD bonus tracks ===
1. "Come On a My House" (Ross Bagdasarian, William Saroyan) 4.00
2. "Mr. Persuasion" (Susan Lynch, Larry Whitman) 3.53
3. "Get Ready Teddy" (Toni Tennille) 3.53
4. "Denny's Such a Flirt" (Toni Tennille) 3.50
5. Boy Crazy (Toni Tennille) 4.22
6. "How Sweet It Is (To Be Loved By You)" (Eddie Holland, Lamont Dozier, Brian Holland) 3.28
7. "Nobody Does It Better" (Marvin Hamlisch, Carole Bayer-Sager) 3.47
8. "Love Survives" (Toni Tennille) 3.26
9. "Baby Come to Me" (Rod Temperton) 3.33
10. "Save the Best for Last" (Waldman, Lind, Galston) 3.45
11. "Wind Beneath My Wings" (Larry Henley, Jeff Silbar) 4.46
