= Come In from the Rain =

Come In from the Rain may refer to:

- "Come In from the Rain", a song written in 1975 by Melissa Manchester and Carole Bayer Sager, covered by many artists
- Come In from the Rain (Andi Deris album), 1997
- Come In from the Rain (Captain & Tennille album), 1977
