= Can't Stop Dancin' =

Can't Stop Dancin' may refer to:

- "Can't Stop Dancin'" (Captain & Tennille song), a 1977 song
- "Can't Stop Dancin'" (Becky G song), a 2014 song

== See also ==
- Can't Stop Dancing, a 1999 film
