= Dream (Captain & Tennille album) =

Studio album by Captain & Tennille
- Released: Late May 1978
- Studios: A&M, Hollywood; Record Plant, Los Angeles; Wally Heider, Hollywood; Rumbo, Canoga Park; Larrabee North, Hollywood
- Genre: Pop
- Length: 41:17
- Label: A&M
- Producer: Daryl Dragon

Captain & Tennille chronology
Come In from the Rain (1977)	''Dream'' (1978)	Make Your Move (1979)

Singles from Dream
- 1. "I'm on My Way" Released: April 1978; 2. "You Never Done It Like That" Released: July 1978; 3. "You Need a Woman Tonight" Released: November 1978

Dream is the fourth album by the duo Captain & Tennille and their final album with A&M Records. After their last two singles released from their prior album failed to enter the Billboard Top 40, two singles released from this album returned them to the Top 40. "You Need a Woman Tonight" peaked at No. 40, and "You Never Done It Like That" took them back to the Top 10, peaking at No. 10. The album peaked at No. 131.

== Recording ==
The album was recorded at A&M Recording Studios (Hollywood, California) 1977; A&M Recording Studios "A" 1977; Rumbo Recorders (Captain & Tennille's Private Studio), (San Fernando Valley) 1977; The Record Plant (Los Angeles) 1977; Wally Heider Recording (Hollywood, California) 1977.

== Critical reception ==
Record World said of "You Never Done It Like That" that "Toni Tennille's semi -sexy vocals are highlighted, driven along nicely by a heavy pop bass line." Record World said that "You Need a Woman Tonight" "has a slight Caribbean beat and is sparked by Toni Tennille's compelling phrasing and the Captain's keyboards." The StarPhoenix called Dream "a strong album, which proves Toni Tennille's vocalizing talents are far-reaching."

== Track listing ==
=== Side one ===
1. "I'm on My Way" (Mark Safan) (2:49)
2. "You Never Done It Like That" (Howard Greenfield, Neil Sedaka) (3:19)
3. "Dixie Hummingbird" (Ray Stevens) (3:59)
4. "You Need a Woman Tonight" (Dana Merino) (3:14)
5. "Love Me Like a Baby" (Greenfield, Toni Tennille) (3:35)
6. "Love Is Spreading Over the World" (Greenfield, Sedaka) (4:02)

=== Side two ===
1. ""D" Keyboard Blues" (Daryl Dragon) (4:00)
2. "Good Enough" (John Hall, Johanna Hall) (4:00)
3. "If There Were Time" (Bruce Johnston, Rod McKuen) (3:51)
4. "Back to the Island" (Leon Russell) (4:33)
5. "Dream" (Johnny Mercer) (3:25)

== Personnel ==
- Guitar, keyboards, bass guitar, percussion: Daryl Dragon
- Drums: Hal Blaine, Shelly Manne, Ron Tutt
- Percussion: Mike Mathis
- Backing vocals: Ron Hicklin, Ron Hicklin, Bruce Johnston, Gene Merlino,
  Gene Morford, Gary Sims, Louisa Tennille, Melissa Tennille

== Charts ==
Year	Album	US 200
1978	Dream	131

== Singles ==
Year	Single	US Hot 100	US AC	Canada RPM 100	Canada AC
1978	"I'm on My Way"	74	6	-	13
1978	"You Never Done It Like That"	10	10	17	38
1978	"You Need a Woman Tonight"	40	40	38	9

"I'm on My Way" also reached No. 97 on the U.S. Billboard Hot Country Songs chart; and "You Never Done It Like That" also reached No. 63 on the UK Singles Chart and No. 51 in Australia.
