= Sad Eyes (Andy Williams song) =

Single by Andy Williams

from the album The Other Side of Me
- B-side: "Quits"
- Released: 1975
- Genre: Pop
- Length: 3:15
- Label: Columbia Records 10208
- Songwriter(s): Neil Sedaka, Phil Cody
- Producer(s): Jack Gold

Andy Williams singles chronology
"Cry Softly" (1975)	"Sad Eyes" (1975)	"The Other Side of Me" (1976)

"Sad Eyes" is a song written by Neil Sedaka and Phil Cody, introduced on Sedaka's 1974 album release Sedaka's Back. As recorded by Andy Williams for his The Other Side of Me album, "Sad Eyes" rose as high as #11 on the adult contemporary chart in November 1975. A single for Maria Muldaur whose version - from for her Sweet Harmony album - would in the spring of 1976 reach number 14 on the Adult Contemporary chart, "Sad Eyes" would also serve as an album cut for Captain & Tennille (Come in from the Rain/ 1977), Helen Schneider (So Close/ 1977), and Arthur Prysock (Here's to Good Friends/ 1978).
