= Sad Eyes =

Sad Eyes may refer to:

- "Sad Eyes" (Andy Williams song), 1975
- "Sad Eyes" (Bruce Springsteen song), 1999; covered by Enrique Iglesias, 2000
- "Sad Eyes" (Robert John song), 1979
- "Sad Eyes", a song by Crystal Castles from III, 2012
- "Sad Eyes", a song by James Arthur from You, 2019
