= The Secret of Christmas (Captain & Tennille album) =

Studio album by Captain & Tennille
- Released: November 6, 2007
- Recorded: 1976–80s, 2006
- Genre: Christmas
- Label: Retroactive Entertainment
- Producer: Toni Tennille and Daryl Dragon

Captain & Tennille chronology
More Than Dancing (1982)	The Secret of Christmas (2007)	ICON (2013)

The Secret of Christmas is a Christmas album by the pop duo Captain & Tennille, and their eighth and final studio album. The Secret of Christmas is a collection of Holiday and Christmas songs predominantly recorded in 2006 and released in 2007 by the independent label, Retroactive Entertainment. "Here Comes Santa Claus", however, was an instrumental track Daryl Dragon recorded in the 1980s.

According to the liner notes, two tracks chosen were originally sung by Judy Garland ("Merry Christmas" and "Have Yourself a Merry Little Christmas"). The album also includes The Beach Boys "Little Saint Nick", which includes the original tracks from their 1976 Captain and Tennille Christmas Special. Daryl Dragon is featured on three instrumental tracks.

The album was produced by Toni Tennille and Daryl Dragon and was originally released only on compact disc. Within the liner notes, there is a photo of their bulldogs, similar to the cover of Captain & Tennille’s first album, Love Will Keep Us Together.

== Track listing ==
1. "Merry Christmas" (Fred Spielman, Janice Torre)
2. "It's The Most Wonderful Time Of The Year" (Eddie Pola, George Wyle)
3. "I Want a Hippopotamus for Christmas" (John Rox)
4. "Have Yourself A Merry Little Christmas" (Hugh Martin, Ralph Blane)
5. "Little Saint Nick" (Mike Love, Brian Wilson)
6. "Here Comes Santa Claus" (Oakley Haldeman)
7. "Tahoe Snow" (Toni Tennille)
8. "Christmas in California" (Toni Tennille)
9. "Boogie Baby Christmas" (Toni Tennille)
10. "Santa Claus Is Coming To Town" (J. Fred Coots, Haven Gillespie)
11. "The Christmas Star" (Toni Tennille)
12. "Silent Night" (Franz Xaver Gruber, Joseph Mohr)
13. "'Daryl' of the Bells" (Mykola Leontovych, Peter J. Wilhousky)
14. "The Secret of Christmas" (Sammy Cahn, Jimmy Van Heusen)
