= I'm on My Way (Captain & Tennille song) =

1978 song by Captain & Tennille

Single by Captain & Tennille

from the album Dream
- B-side: "We Never Really Say Goodbye"
- Released: April 1978
- Genre: Pop
- Label: A&M
- Songwriter: Mark Safan
- Producer: Daryl Dragon

Captain & Tennille singles chronology
| "Circles" (1977) | "I'm on My Way" (1978) | "You Never Done It Like That" (1978) |

"I'm on My Way" is a 1978 song by Captain & Tennille. It is a track on their LP Dream. The single was released a month prior to the release of the LP. Songwriter Mark Safan first released his version of the song in 1976 on Warner Bros. Records.

The song became a hit in the U.S. on the Pop, Country and Adult Contemporary charts. It reached number 74 on the U.S. Billboard Hot 100, also made a minor showing on the Country chart. It did best on the Adult Contemporary chart, peaking at number 6 in the U.S. as well as number 13 in Canada.

Record World called it "a light rockabilly tune with a seasonal hook and a good vocal by Toni."

A version by Andrew Gold was included on his 1978 LP All This and Heaven Too, which was issued as a single on Asylum Records one week prior to the release of Captain & Tennille's single.

== Chart history ==
| Chart (1978) | Peak position |
|---|---|
| Canada RPM Adult Contemporary | 13 |
| U.S. Billboard Hot 100 | 74 |
| U.S. Billboard Adult Contemporary | 6 |
| U.S. Billboard Country | 97 |
| U.S. Cash Box Top 100 | 86 |
