= Sweet Harmony (album) =

Studio album by Maria Muldaur
- Released: 1976
- Studio: Warner Bros. Recording Studios
- Label: Reprise
- Producer: Joe Boyd, Lenny Waronker

Maria Muldaur chronology
Waitress in a Donut Shop (1974)	Sweet Harmony (1976)	Southern Winds (1978)

Professional ratings
Review scores
Source	Rating
AllMusic	4/5 stars
The Encyclopedia of Popular Music	4/5 stars

Sweet Harmony is the third solo studio album by Maria Muldaur. It was released in 1976 on the Reprise label. The album was produced by Joe Boyd and Lenny Waronker. It features J. J. Cale and Waddy Wachtel on guitar, Earl Palmer on drums, and others.

== Track listing ==
1. "Sweet Harmony" (Smokey Robinson) – 4:45
2. "Sad Eyes" (Neil Sedaka, Phil Cody) – 4:30
3. "Lying Song" (Kate McGarrigle) – 4:07
4. "Rockin' Chair" (Hoagy Carmichael) – 3:42
5. "I Can't Stand It" (Smokey McAllister) – 3:37
6. "We Just Couldn't Say Goodbye" (Harry Woods) – 3:35
7. "Back by Fall" (Wendy Waldman) – 3:55
8. "Jon the Generator" (John Herald) – 3:20
9. "Wild Bird" (Wendy Waldman) – 4:45
10. "As an Eagle Stirreth in Her Nest" (William Herbert Brewster) – 4:11

== Personnel ==
- Maria Muldaur - lead vocals
- Amos Garrett, David Wilcox, Kenny Burrell, John Girton, David Nichtern, Waddy Wachtel - guitar
- J.J. Cale - electric guitar and slide guitar on "Sad Eyes"
- Bill Dickinson, Willie Weeks, Larry Gales, Michael Moore - bass guitar
- Michael Finnigan, James Booker, Joe Harnell, Bill Payne - piano
- William Smith - Fender Rhodes electric piano
- Earl Palmer, Russ Kunkel, Gary Mallaber - drums
- Victor Feldman - vibraphone, congas, percussion
- Marshall Royal, Plas Johnson - tenor saxophone
- Sahib Shihab - baritone saxophone
- John Rotella - clarinet
- Benny Powell, Britt Woodman - trombone
- Howard Johnson - tuba
- Nick DeCaro - string arrangement on "Sweet Harmony"
