= Euson =

Aruban-Dutch singer-songwriter

- Also known as: Julio, Julio Bernardo Euson
- Born: Julio Bernardo Euson; April 12, 1941 (age 85); Aruba
- Labels: CBS, Polydor, GTB, Pathé, Imperial, Poker

Julio Bernardo Euson (born April 12, 1941), professionally known as Euson, is an Aruban-Dutch singer, songwriter and occasional actor.

== Biography ==
Euson formed his first band aging just twelve years. After winning a number of amateur talent contests on Aruba he tried his luck and emigrated to the Netherlands in 1962. Besides accepting a job at PTT he joined the beat groups The Scarlets from The Hague, changing to the Rotterdam garage rock band Kreole Kats which renamed to Julio [Euson] & the Kreole Kats. Meeting jazz musicians Chris Hinze, flute player, and Cees Schrama, keyboardist and some former members of The Lords, formerly the supporting group of singer Rob de Nijs in 1967 resulted in cooperating as Stax, the supporting group of J.B. Euson. In 1970 however Hinze opted for a solo career, while Schrama started organizing Sesjun jazz sessions and festivals in Loosdrecht, radio presentation work, and his own instrumental jazzrock group Casey & the Pressure Group, leaving Euson no other choice than going solo.

Euson then became famous in the early 1970s in the Netherlands and in Latin America. With his producer Hans van Baaren he recorded and had a hit with Both Sides, Now. In 1971 he represented, together with Ben Cramer, the Netherlands at the Golden Orpheus song contest in Bulgaria. Later in 1971 Euson and Lenny Kuhr took part in the Sopot International Song Festival, a musical festival and song contest in Poland. Euson was the winner of the Viña del Mar International Song Festival in Chile in 1972 where he represented the Netherlands with the song 'Julie' written and composed by himself. In 1973 together with Oscar Harris, he represented the Netherlands again at the Golden Orpheus song contest in Bulgaria.

Euson is known especially in this period of time for his pop and soul ballads like 'Both Sides, Now', 'Julie', which shared the Zilveren Harp in 1973, and 'Leon'. The beauty of his voice is internationally recognized as in the nineties he is added to the Karen Carpenter memorial list, The Worlds Most Beautiful Voices: The Ultimate Hall of Fame.

In 1977 Euson, experiencing a fade into the unknown, accompanied by his Polish wife Stanka Matić and manager Peter Kok left the Netherlands and moved to the USA. When they didn't succeed over there either, in 1978 they moved on to Chile, knowing Euson's 1972 song contest victory was granting them access to success. They founded a radio station and a production company P.J. Productions, producing Chilean artists. Cultural life in Chile however was suffering from the suppression by the Pinochet military regime. Euson and his wife later moved back to the USA. Euson took up acting in American B-movies. Peter Kok moved back to the Netherlands and became a background musician in theatres.

Euson is related to Kizzy.

== Discography ==
=== Singles ===
- My Plea - 1964
- Now I Know - The Scarlets - 1966
- Ooh Pook Pah Doo - Julio and the Kreole Kats - 1966
- Amen - 1967
- True Love - 1967
- I Want You Around Me - J.B. Euson & Stax - 1968
- A Fool For You - J.B. Euson & Stax - 1970
- Born on the Bayou - 1970
- My Purpose In Life - 1970
- Both Sides, Now - 1970 - #7 in January, 1971
- I Need You To Turn To - 1971
- Crimson Eyes - 1972
- Julie - 1972
- Angelina b/w Put Your Trust In The Lord - 1972
- Dirty Lady - 1973
- Life Is On My Side - #20 in July, 1973
- Our Last Song Together - 1973
- Leon - #14 in May/June, 1974
- Sweet Surrender - 1974
- Shadow Of Love - 1974
- I Use The Soap - 1974 - #30 in January, 1975
- Midnight Blue - 1976
- Four And Twenty Hours - 1976
- Canta Libre - 1977

=== Albums ===
- J.B. Euson Live At Club 67 - J.B. Euson & Stax - 1967
- Both Sides Now - 1971
- Euson - 1972
- Life Is On My Side - 1973
- Better Days - 1974
- Favourites Of The Fifties - 1974
- Sweet Surrender - 1975
- Midnight Blue - 1976
- The Best Of Euson (compilation album) - 1976
- The Best Of ... (compilation album) - 1987

== Filmography ==
- The Brothers Grimm (2001)
- Virus Man (2001)
