= The Way I Want to Touch You =

Single by Captain & Tennille

from the album Love Will Keep Us Together
- B-side: "Broddy Bounce"
- Released: September 1975
- Recorded: 1973
- Genre: Pop
- Length: 2:43
- Label: A&M
- Songwriter: Toni Tennille
- Producer: Morgan Cavett

Captain & Tennille singles chronology
"Love Will Keep Us Together" (1975)	"The Way I Want to Touch You" (1975)	"Lonely Night (Angel Face)" (1976)

Licensed audio
- "The Way I Want to Touch You" on YouTube

Alternative cover
- International single sleeve

"The Way I Want to Touch You" is a song written by Toni Tennille, which started the professional recording careers for Captain & Tennille. It was certified gold by the Recording Industry Association of America (RIAA) for sales of one million units. Captain & Tennille recorded a Spanish version, entitled "Como Yo Quiero Sentirte" which was released as a single in 1975. It was taken from the Spanish version of their debut album Por Amor Viviremos. The duo also re-recorded "The Way I Want to Touch You" in 1995 for their album, 20 Years of Romance.

== Background ==
Tennille explained that she wrote the song about how she really felt about Daryl "The Captain" Dragon". She had written it in 1972, during the year when she and Daryl toured with the Beach Boys.

In September 1973, Toni and Daryl were performing at The Smokehouse Restaurant in Encino, California and two men from a small radio station were in the audience one night. They asked Toni and Daryl if they had any records, and at the time, they hadn't. This inspired the duo to record two songs, "The Way I Want to Touch You" and "Disney Girls" at a small recording studio (the size of a garage) located in the San Fernando Valley. A man by the name of Morgan Cavett, a songwriter and producer who gained his first major success by writing for the musical group Steppenwolf assisted Daryl and Toni with producing these recordings. On the liner notes of the Love Will Keep Us Together album a special thanks was given to Morgan Cavett for introducing the Captain to Tennille.

Daryl and Toni initially pressed a few copies and gave them to several small radio stations in the Los Angeles area. Soon the stations were calling the duo saying that they were getting strong feedback. Daryl and Toni decided to go ahead and spend $250 to have 500 vinyl copies pressed. They sent samples to radio stations and then drove off in a camper truck to visit 130 stations in 22 states to promote the single. The original vinyl pressings were issued on Butterscotch Castle Records, a label name created by Captain and Tennille. Soon afterwards, additional copies were released and distributed by Joyce Records.

Three Los Angeles DJs Wink Martindale and Gary Owens of KMPC and Johnny Hayes of KRLA began talking about the song and promoting it out of merit. The record finally caught the attention of A&M Records, who bought the single and re-released it on their label in 1974. This time it became a minor chart maker on the west coast, but was only qualified as a regional hit.

Cash Box said that "this is the single that impressed the label enough to give the duo the shot that produced Love Will Keep Us Together". Record World called it a "compelling Toni Tennille love ballad". Record World also reviewed the 1973 single, calling it "a sensational 'ladies record' that should immediately garner tremendous pop and MOR airplay with super vocals, romantically explicit lyrics and a genuine hit sound".

== Personnel ==
- Daryl Dragon (The Captain) – keyboards, bass, arrangements
- Jane Tennille, Louisa Tennille, Melissa Tennille, Toni Tennille – background vocals
- Ed Greene – drums

== Chart performance ==
After the worldwide success of the single "Love Will Keep Us Together", A&M Records re-released "The Way I Want to Touch You" in September 1975. This time the song reached #4 on the Billboard Hot 100 and #3 on the Cash Box Top 100. It was their second #1 hit on the Adult Contemporary charts of both the US and Canada.

=== Weekly charts ===
Chart (1975–1976)	Peak position
Australia (Kent Music Report)	9
Canada Adult Contemporary (RPM)	1
Canada Top Singles (RPM)	4
New Zealand (Recorded Music NZ)	21
UK Singles (OCC)	28
US Adult Contemporary (Billboard)	1
US Billboard Hot 100	4
US Cash Box Top 100	3

=== Year-end charts ===
Chart (1975)	Position
US (Joel Whitburn's Pop Annual)	58
US Cash Box Top 100	53

Chart (1976)	Position
Australia (Kent Music Report)	64
Canada Top Singles (RPM)	45

== Certifications ==
Region	Certification	Certified units/sales
United States (RIAA)	Gold	1,000,000^{^}
^{^} Shipments figures based on certification alone.

== Other notable versions ==
- Lonette McKee on her 1974 album Lonette
- Shirley Bassey on her 1976 album Love, Life and Feelings
- Ray Conniff on the 1976 album I Write the Songs
- The Laurie Bower Singers on the 2002 album Evergreen
- Carmen Rodgers on her 2004 album Free
- Matt Catingub Orchestra of Hawaii on the 2006 album Return to Romance featuring vocals by Toni Tennille

== See also ==
- List of number-one adult contemporary singles of 1975 (U.S.)
