= The Other Side of Me (Andy Williams album) =

Studio album by Andy Williams
- Released: 1975
- Recorded: April 12, 1973; March 24, 1975; May 19–28, 1975
- Genre: Vocal pop; traditional pop
- Length: 38:37
- Label: Columbia
- Producer: Jack Gold

Andy Williams chronology
You Lay So Easy on My Mind (1974)	The Other Side of Me (1975)	Andy (1976)

Singles from The Other Side of Me
- 1. "The Other Side of Me" Released: March 1976

The Other Side of Me is the thirty-fifth studio album by American pop singer Andy Williams, released in the summer of 1975 by Columbia Records and including the 1973 recording of "Solitaire" from his album of the same name alongside 10 original recordings, four of which were also by "Solitaire" composer Neil Sedaka. After unsuccessful attempts to leave behind the formulaic album genre of easy listening covers of pop hits, The Other Side of Me offered a compromise by filling half of the sides with material that was popularized by other artists and the other half with either new or obscure selections.

Although The Other Side of Me did not make it onto Billboard magazine's Top LP's & Tapes chart in the US, it did spend one week on the UK albums chart in October 1975 at number 60.

The UK version of the album included one additional track, "Love Said Goodbye", which had entered Billboard's list of the 40 most popular Easy Listening songs of the week in the US in the issue dated January 11, 1975, and reached number 24 over the course of seven weeks. The first song released from the US version of the album was "Sad Eyes", which entered the Easy Listening chart in the October 11, 1975, issue and stayed there for seven weeks, peaking at number 11, and the title track from the album entered the UK singles chart on March 6, 1976, for a three-week stay that took the song to number 42.

The North American version of The Other Side of Me was released on compact disc as one of two albums on one CD by Collectables Records on February 19, 2002, along with Williams's 1974 Columbia album, You Lay So Easy on My Mind. Collectables included this CD in a box set entitled Classic Album Collection, Vol. 2, which contains 15 of his studio albums and two compilations, released on November 29, 2002.

== Reception ==
Professional ratings
Review scores
Source	Rating
AllMusic	3/5 stars
The Encyclopedia of Popular Music	3/5 stars

William Ruhlmann of AllMusic described the album as a "a good contemporary pop album" and noted that "Williams celebrated by cutting an album anchored by Sedaka songs, including the title track, "The Hungry Years", and "Sad Eyes." and covers of the recent hits "My Eyes Adored You" and "Mandy," a version of "Feelings"

== Track listing ==
=== Side one ===
1. "The Other Side of Me" (Howard Greenfield, Neil Sedaka) – 3:20
2. "Quits" (Danny O'Keefe) – 2:54
3. "Love Will Keep Us Together" (Greenfield, Sedaka) – 3:31
4. "My Eyes Adored You" (Bob Crewe, Kenny Nolan) – 2:57
5. "The Hungry Years" (Greenfield, Sedaka) – 4:10
6. "Solitaire" (Phil Cody, Sedaka) – 4:21

=== Side two ===
1. "Sad Eyes" (Cody, Sedaka) – 3:21
2. "Feelings" (Morris Albert) – 2:56
3. "In My Eyes" (Crewe, Nolan) – 3:46
4. "Mandy" (Scott English, Richard Kerr) – 3:07
5. "What Happens to You" (Stevie Wonder) – 4:18

Along with the addition of "Love Said Goodbye", the UK version replaced "Solitaire" with "Pieces of April" from Alone Again (Naturally), Williams's 1972 album that was re-titled The First Time Ever (I Saw Your Face) for its UK release.

== Recording dates ==
=== North American release ===
From the liner notes for the 2002 CD:

- May 19–28, 1975 – all tracks except as noted
- April 12, 1973 – "Solitaire"
- March 24, 1975 – "Quits"

=== UK release (additional tracks) ===
- July 18, 1972 – "Pieces of April"
- December 6, 1974 – "Love Said Goodbye"

== Personnel ==
From the liner notes for the original album:

- Andy Williams – vocals
- Jack Gold – producer (except as noted)
- Nick DeCaro – arranger (except as noted)
- David Paich – producer ("Love Said Goodbye")
- Marty Paich – arranger/producer ("Love Said Goodbye")
- Richard Perry – producer ("Solitaire")
- Dick Bogert – engineer (except as noted)
- Bill Schnee – engineer ("Solitaire")
- Armin Steiner – engineer ("Feelings")
- Larry Brown - mixdown (except "Solitaire" and "Feelings")
- Michael Reese - mastering
- Kirby Johnson - arranger, strings and woodwinds ("Solitaire")

== Bibliography ==
- Whitburn, Joel (2007), Joel Whitburn Presents Billboard Top Adult Songs, 1961-2006, Record Research Inc., ISBN 978-0-89820-169-7
- Whitburn, Joel (2009), Joel Whitburn's Top Pop Singles, 1955-2008, Record Research Inc., ISBN 978-0-89820-180-2
