= Our Last Song Together =

Single by Neil Sedaka

from the album The Tra-La Days Are Over
- B-side: "I Don't Know What I Like About You"
- Released: September 1973
- Genre: Pop, Easy Listening
- Label: MGM
- Songwriter(s): Neil Sedaka, Howard Greenfield
- Producer(s): Neil Sedaka

Neil Sedaka singles chronology
"Suspicions" (1973)	"Our Last Song Together" (1973)	"Love Will Keep Us Together" (1973)

"Our Last Song Together" is a 1973 song recorded by Neil Sedaka. It is a track from his LP The Tra-La Days Are Over, and was the third of four single releases from the album.

The song became a Top 40 hit in the UK (#31) and Ireland (#19) for Sedaka in late 1973. It also became a minor U.S. hit for both Bobby Sherman and Bo Donaldson & the Heywoods.

== Background ==
Co-written by Sedaka with his long-term songwriting partner Howard Greenfield, they wrote "Our Last Song Together" after Sedaka convinced Greenfield that bringing their nearly 20-year relationship to an end in order to work with others would be mutually beneficial. Sedaka's collaborations with Greenfield were no longer charting, and after experimenting with several other songwriters (among them Roger Atkins and Carole Bayer), Sedaka had begun to find success with lyricist Phil Cody, who would write many of the lyrics for Sedaka's comeback. Greenfield had been collaborating with other songwriters as well (such as Jack Keller and Helen Miller) but had almost no success after breaking off from Sedaka. Greenfield was largely distraught by the breakup; he nevertheless decided to write "Our Last Song Together" and "Love Will Keep Us Together" as their last songs. Ironically, "Love Will Keep Us Together" would become their biggest hit when recorded by the Captain & Tennille in 1975; the success (along with Phil Cody's encouragement) prompted Sedaka and Greenfield to resume writing songs together in the late 1970s, culminating in their last hit, "Should've Never Let You Go."

== Synopsis ==
The song is a nostalgic self-description of the breakup of the songwriting partnership between Sedaka and Greenfield. Greenfield's lyrics include numerous homages to the songs he and Sedaka had written in the 1950s and early 1960s.

== Personnel ==
- Neil Sedaka – lead vocals, piano
- Lol Creme – guitars, backing vocals
- Eric Stewart – guitars, backing vocals
- Graham Gouldman – bass guitars, backing vocals
- Kevin Godley – drums, percussion, backing vocals
- Del Newman – orchestral arrangements

== Cover versions ==
The first cover of "Our Last Song Together" was recorded by Euson in 1973. In 1975, two covers of "Our Last Song Together" charted in the U.S.: Bobby Sherman on the Easy Listening chart and Bo Donaldson and The Heywoods on the Pop chart.

Agnetha Fältskog (ABBA) recorded a Swedish cover version in 1973, "Vi har hunnit fram till refrängen" as the B-Side to her solo single, "En sång om sorg och glädje" which reached #1 on the Swedish charts in 1973. Both songs were included on her 1973 album, Agnetha Fältskogs bästa .

Claude François recorded a France cover version in 1973, "Notre dernière chanson ensemble" from the album Chanson populaire.

The song was also covered in 1975 by Pratt & McClain.

== Chart history ==
Neil Sedaka

Chart (1973)	Peak position
Ireland (IRMA)	19
UK Singles Chart	31

Bo Donaldson & the Heywoods

Chart (1975)	Peak position
U.S. Billboard Hot 100	95
U.S. Cash Box Top 100	98

Bobby Sherman

Chart (1975)	Peak position
U.S. Billboard Easy Listening	34
