= 18th Annual Grammy Awards =

1976 US music awards ceremony

- Date: February 28, 1976
- Location: Hollywood Palladium, Los Angeles, California
- Country: United States
- Hosted by: Andy Williams
- Most awards: Phil Woods, Michel Legrand, Janis Ian and Paul Simon (2)
- Most nominations: –
- Website: https://www.grammy.com/awards/18th-annual-grammy-awards

Television/radio coverage
- Network: CBS

The 18th Annual Grammy Awards were held February 28, 1976, and were broadcast live on American television. They recognized accomplishments by musicians from the year 1975.

Natalie Cole is the first African American to win Best New Artist.

== Performers ==
- Natalie Cole - This Will Be (An Everlasting Love)
- Paul Simon - 50 Ways to Leave Your Lover
- Barry Manilow - Mandy/Could It Be Magic
- Ella Fitzgerald & Mel Torme - Jazz scat performance
- The Eagles - Lyin' Eyes
- Janis Ian - At Seventeen
- Captain & Tennille - Love Will Keep Us Together
- Bert and Ernie - I Refuse to Sing Along

== Presenters ==
- Stevie Wonder & Joan Baez - Record of the Year
- Captain & Tennille - Album of the Year
- Ella Fitzgerald & Mel Torme - Best Jazz Performance by a Group
- Helen Reddy & Neil Sedaka - Best New Artist
- Henry Mancini - Narrated a tribute to the music of Chicago
- Aretha Franklin & The Lockers - Best R&B Performance by a Duo Or Group
- Lily Tomlin - Best Female Pop Vocal Performance
- Gladys Knight & The Pips - Song Of The Year
- Waylon Jennings & Jessi Colter

== Award winners ==
- Record of the Year
  - "Love Will Keep Us Together" - Captain & Tennille (artist) & Daryl Dragon (producer)
- Album of the Year
  - Still Crazy After All These Years - Paul Simon (artist) - Phil Ramone & Paul Simon (producers)
- Song of the Year
  - "Send In the Clowns" - Judy Collins (artist) - Stephen Sondheim (songwriter)
- Best New Artist
  - Natalie Cole (1st African American to win)

=== Children's ===
- Best Recording for Children
  - Richard Burton for The Little Prince

=== Classical ===
- Best Classical Performance – Orchestra
  - Pierre Boulez (conductor), the Camarata Singers & the New York Philharmonic for Ravel: Daphnis et Chloé (Complete Ballet)
- Best Classical Vocal Performance
  - Janet Baker for Mahler: Kindertotenlieder
- Best Opera Recording
  - Erik Smith (producer), Colin Davis (conductor), Richard van Allan, Janet Baker, Montserrat Caballé, Ileana Cotrubas, Wladimiro Ganzarolli, Nicolai Gedda & the Orchestra of the Royal Opera House for Mozart: Cosi Fan Tutte
- Best Choral Performance, Classical (other than opera)
  - Michael Tilson Thomas (conductor), Robert Page (choir director) the Cleveland Boys Choir & Cleveland Orchestra Chorus- Orff: Carmina Burana
- Best Classical Performance Instrumental Soloist or Soloists (with orchestra)
  - Rafael Frühbeck de Burgos (conductor), Alicia de Larrocha & the London Philharmonic for Ravel: Concerto for Left Hand and Concerto for Piano in G/Fauré: Fantaisie for Piano and Orchestra
- Best Classical Performance Instrumental Soloist or Soloists (without orchestra)
  - Nathan Milstein for Bach: Sonatas and Partitas for Violin Unaccompanied
- Best Chamber Music Performance
  - Pierre Fournier, Arthur Rubinstein & Henryk Szeryng for Schubert: Trios Nos. 1 in B Flat, Op. 99 and 2 in E Flat, Op. 100 (Piano Trios)
- Album of the Year, Classical
  - Raymond Minshull (producer), Georg Solti (conductor) & the Chicago Symphony Orchestra for Beethoven: Symphonies (9) Complete

=== Comedy ===
- Best Comedy Recording
  - Richard Pryor for Is It Something I Said?

=== Composing and arranging ===
- Best Instrumental Composition
  - Michel Legrand for Images performed by Michel Legrand & Phil Woods
- Album of Best Original Score Written for a Motion Picture or a Television Special
  - John Williams (composer) for Jaws
- Best Instrumental Arrangement
  - Pete Carpenter & Mike Post (arrangers) for "The Rockford Files" performed by Mike Post
- Best Arrangement Accompanying Vocalist(s)
  - Ray Stevens (arranger) for "Misty"

=== Country ===
- Best Country Vocal Performance, Female
  - Linda Ronstadt for "I Can't Help It (If I'm Still in Love With You)"
- Best Country Vocal Performance, Male
  - Willie Nelson for "Blue Eyes Crying in the Rain"
- Best Country Vocal Performance by a Duo or Group
  - Rita Coolidge & Kris Kristofferson for "Lover Please"
- Best Country Instrumental Performance
  - Chet Atkins for "The Entertainer"
- Best Country Song
  - Larry Butler & Chips Moman (songwriters) for "(Hey Won't You Play) Another Somebody Done Somebody Wrong Song" performed by B. J. Thomas

=== Folk ===
- Best Ethnic or Traditional Recording
  - Muddy Waters for The Muddy Waters Woodstock Album

=== Gospel ===
- Best Gospel Performance (other than soul gospel)
  - The Imperials for No Shortage
- Best Soul Gospel Performance
  - Andrae Crouch for Take Me Back performed by Andrae Crouch & the Disciples
- Best Inspirational Performance
  - The Bill Gaither Trio for Jesus, We Just Want to Thank You

=== Jazz ===
- Best Jazz Performance by a Soloist
  - Dizzy Gillespie for Oscar Peterson and Dizzy Gillespie
- Best Jazz Performance by a Group
  - Chick Corea & Return to Forever for No Mystery
- Best Jazz Performance by a Big Band
  - Michel Legrand & Phil Woods for Images

=== Latin ===
- Best Latin Recording
  - Eddie Palmieri for Sun of Latin Music

=== Musical show ===
- Best Cast Show Album
  - Charlie Smalls (composer), Jerry Wexler (producer) & the original cast with Stephanie Mills & Dee Dee Bridgewater for The Wiz

=== Packaging and notes ===
- Best Album Package
  - Jim Ladwig (art director) for Honey performed by the Ohio Players
- Best Album Notes
  - Pete Hamill (notes writer) for Blood on the Tracks performed by Bob Dylan
- Best Album Notes – Classical
  - Gunther Schuller (notes writer) for Footlifters performed by Gunther Schuller

=== Pop ===
- Best Pop Vocal Performance, Female
  - "At Seventeen"-Janis Ian
- Best Pop Vocal Performance, Male
  - "Still Crazy After All These Years"-Paul Simon
- Best Pop Vocal Performance by a Duo, Group or Chorus
  - "Lyin' Eyes"-The Eagles
- Best Pop Instrumental Performance
  - "The Hustle"-Van McCoy

=== Production and engineering ===
- Best Engineered Recording, Non-Classical
  - Brooks Arthur, Larry Alexander & Russ Payne for Janis Ian's Between the Lines
- Best Engineered Recording, Classical
  - Edward (Bud) T. Graham, Milton Cherin, Ray Moore (engineers), Pierre Boulez (conductor), the Camarata Singers & the New York Philharmonic for Ravel: Daphnis et Chloe (Complete Ballet)
- Producer of the Year, Non-Classical
  - Arif Mardin

=== R&B ===
- Best R&B Vocal Performance, Female
  - Natalie Cole for "This Will Be"
- Best R&B Vocal Performance, Male
  - Ray Charles for "Living for the City"
- Best R&B Vocal Performance by a Duo, Group or Chorus
  - Earth, Wind & Fire for "Shining Star"
- Best R&B Instrumental Performance
  - Silver Convention for "Fly, Robin, Fly"
- Best Rhythm & Blues Song
  - Harry Wayne Casey, Willie Clarke, Richard Finch & Betty Wright (songwriters) for "Where Is the Love" performed by Betty Wright

=== Spoken ===
- Best Spoken Word Recording
  - James Whitmore for Give 'Em Hell Harry
