= Toni Tennille =

American singer (b. 1940)

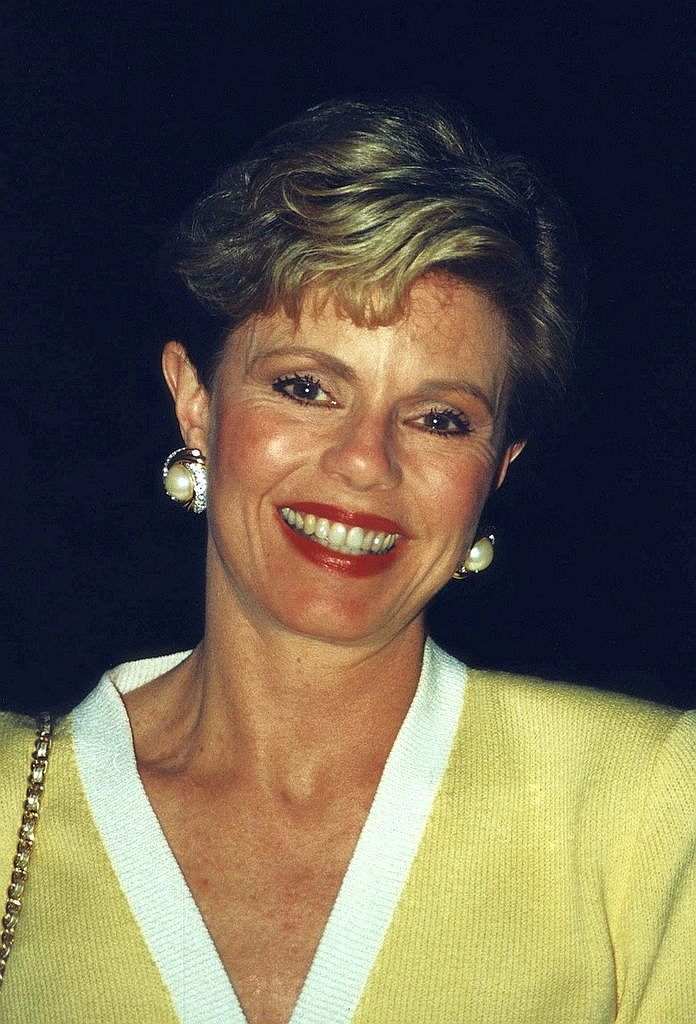
- Tennille in 1996

Background information
- Born: Cathryn Antoinette Tennille; May 8, 1940 (age 86); Montgomery, Alabama, U.S.
- Genres: Pop; jazz
- Occupations: Singer; songwriter; musician
- Instruments: Vocals; keyboards
- Years active: 1971–present
- Labels: A&M; Casablanca
- Formerly of: Captain & Tennille
- Website: www.tonitennille.net

Cathryn Antoinette "Toni" Tennille (born May 8, 1940) is an American singer-songwriter and keyboardist. A contralto, she is best known as one-half of the 1970s duo Captain & Tennille with her former husband Daryl Dragon; their signature song is "Love Will Keep Us Together". Tennille also performed musical work independently of Dragon, including solo albums and session work.

== Early life ==
Tennille was born and raised in Montgomery, Alabama, and has three younger sisters. Her father Frank owned a furniture store and also served in the Alabama Legislature from 1951 to 1954. He had been a singer with Bob Crosby's Bob-Cats. For five years, her mother, also named Cathryn (née Wright), hosted a daily television show in Montgomery.

Tennille graduated from Sidney Lanier High School, Class of 1958, and then for two years attended Auburn University in Alabama, where she studied classical piano and sang with a local big band, the Auburn Knights. She was initiated into Delta Delta Delta.

In 1959, after her father's furniture store failed, Tennille's family moved from Montgomery to Balboa, California, where she worked first as a file clerk and then as a statistical analyst for North American Rockwell Corporation.

== Career ==
=== Early career ===
While living in Corona del Mar in Newport Beach, California, during the late 1960s, Tennille was a member of the South Coast Repertory. Ron Thronson, one of the directors of the repertory, asked Tennille in 1969 to write the music for a new rock musical he was working on called Mother Earth. The musical was a success locally, went on the road to San Francisco and Los Angeles in 1971, and eventually made it to Broadway for a few dates at the Belasco Theatre in October 1972. Although Tennille was no longer associated with the musical by the time it reached Broadway, she was credited as the composer under her married name, Shearer.

In 1971, Tennille met her future husband Daryl Dragon in San Francisco during auditions for Mother Earth. Dragon had previously toured with The Beach Boys and had recorded with them as a studio musician. After Mother Earth ended, Dragon returned to the Beach Boys and introduced Tennille to the band. Tennille played electric piano with the band during their 1972 tour, and it was during this time that Tennille wrote "The Way I Want to Touch You".

=== Captain & Tennille ===
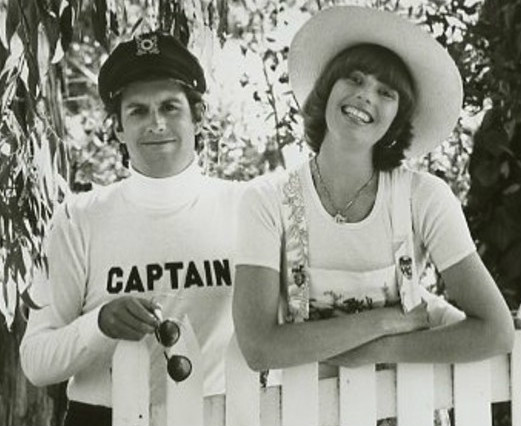
Tennille and Dragon in 1976

After the conclusion of the Beach Boys tour, Tennille and Dragon began performing as a duo at a restaurant in Encino, California, eventually naming the act Captain & Tennille. They self-financed the recording of Tennille's song "The Way I Want to Touch You", and the song became popular on a Los Angeles radio station, leading to several offers from record companies and a record contract with A&M Records.

In 1975, the title track from the duo's debut studio album, Love Will Keep Us Together topped the Billboard pop chart for four weeks starting June 21, 1975. Following the success of "Love Will Keep Us Together", A&M re-released the Tennille-penned "The Way I Want to Touch You" in September 1975, with the song becoming the duo's second #1 hit on the Adult Contemporary charts of both the US and Canada.

"Love Will Keep Us Together" topped the 1975 year-end chart. In the US it was the best-selling single of 1975. "Love Will Keep Us Together" won the Grammy Award (1975) for Record of the Year on February 28, 1976.

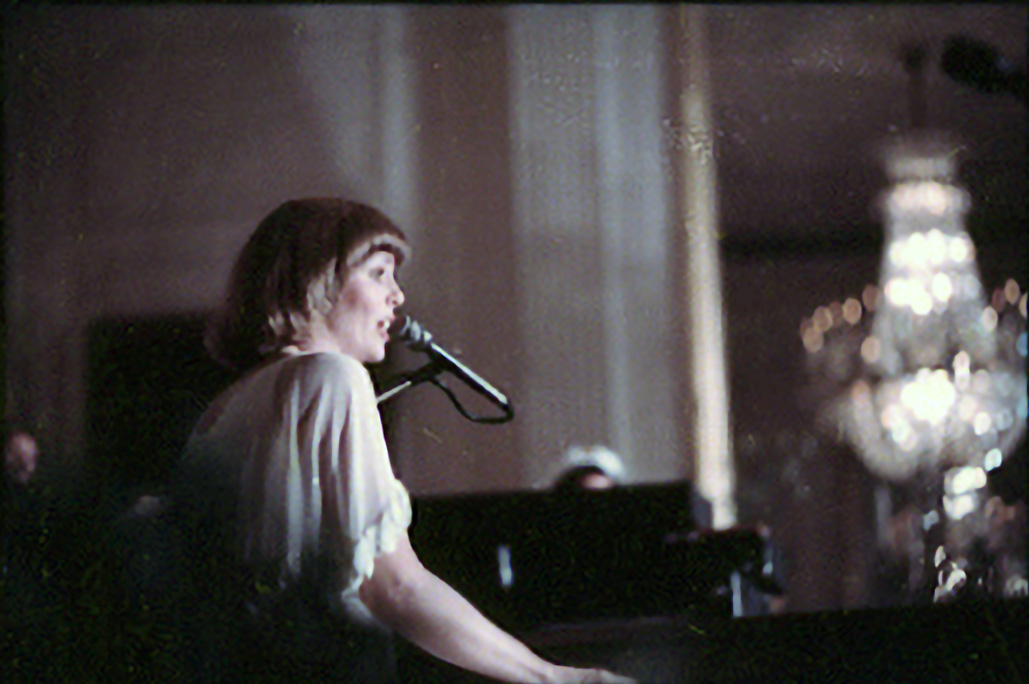
Tennille performing in the White House in 1976

In July 1976, Tennille and Dragon were invited by First Lady Betty Ford to perform in the East Room of the White House in the presence of Queen Elizabeth II and President Gerald Ford as part of the United States Bicentennial celebration. Such was the level of their popularity that they were given their own television variety show, The Captain and Tennille, which featured Tennille and Dragon performing musical numbers and comedy sketches with various guest stars. The show aired from September 1976 to March 1977 on ABC.

Over the next few years, Captain & Tennille released a string of hit singles mostly from their first two albums Love Will Keep Us Together (US #2, 1975) and Song Of Joy (US #9, 1976) including "The Way I Want to Touch You" (US #4), "Lonely Night (Angel Face)" (US #3), "Shop Around" (US #4), and "Muskrat Love" (US #4). Between 1975 and 1982, Tennille would record seven studio albums with the duo.

Throughout the 1990s, Tennille and Dragon continued to perform various concert dates at venues around the world, frequently at Harrah's Lake Tahoe and Harrah's Reno, which were located close to their home near Carson City, Nevada.

In 2005, she recorded the Christmas song "Saving Up Christmas" with Dragon as Captain & Tennille, and the song was included in The Ultimate Collection DVD box set. This was followed by a full-length Christmas album titled The Secret of Christmas, released in 2007.

=== Solo career ===
During the duo's period of highest popularity, Tennille also worked as a session singer (most frequently partnered with the Beach Boys' Bruce Johnston), performing as a backing vocalist on the Elton John albums Caribou, Blue Moves, and 21 at 33 (some vocally arranged by Dragon) and most notably on the hit track "Don't Let the Sun Go Down on Me". She also appeared as a backing vocalist on tracks by Art Garfunkel and the Beach Boys, as well as Pink Floyd for whom she performed backing vocals on The Wall. In the liner notes of the Captain & Tennille anthology Ultimate Collection: The Complete Hits, Tennille explains how her work on Pink Floyd's album gained her at least one new fan:

I went to see the Pink Floyd concert at the Sports Arena in Los Angeles. There was a 15-year-old boy sitting in front of me who recognized me. He turned around and snottily said, 'What are YOU doing here?' So I told him I sang on the album. He ran off to find a friend who had brought the LP to the show, and looked at the back to see if my name was really on there. A few minutes later, he came back and apologetically said, 'Can I have your autograph?'

— Tennille, Ultimate Collection: The Complete Hits

On July 8, 1980, Tennille sang the national anthem at the Major League Baseball All-Star game at Dodger Stadium in Los Angeles.

Following a December 1979 pilot, from September 1980 to February 1981 Tennille hosted her own syndicated television talk show, The Toni Tennille Show. She also made two guest appearances on "The Love Boat": Season 2 Episode 6, which aired on October 21, 1978, and Season 4 Episode 28 which aired on May 16, 1981.

Throughout the 1980s and 1990s, Tennille enjoyed a second career as a big band and pop standard singer, similar to pop colleague Linda Ronstadt. She performed with orchestras throughout the country and subsequently recorded several solo albums including More Than You Know (Mirage Records, 1984), and All of Me (Gaia Records, 1987). From September 1998 to June 1999, Tennille starred in the lead role of Victoria Grant/Count Victor Grazinski in the national tour of the Broadway musical Victor/Victoria.

In November 2003, Tennille performed a benefit concert for the Reno, Nevada Chamber Orchestra, where her surprise guest was Dragon. It was the first time they had publicly performed as Captain & Tennille in many years. Their first live recording, An Intimate Evening with Toni Tennille, was released to commemorate the event.

In April 2016, Tennille released her memoir, Toni Tennille: A Memoir, and went on a book tour to promote it later that summer. An audiobook of the memoir was also released on the audiobook service Audible.

== Personal life ==
Tennille married her first husband, former drummer Kenneth Shearer, in June 1962 at the age of 22. They divorced in late 1972. She married Daryl Dragon on November 11, 1975. Tennille stated that their accountant told them they would do "a lot better with taxes" if they were married. In 2007, the couple moved from Reno, Nevada, to Prescott, Arizona. They divorced in July 2014.

In 2015, Tennille moved to Florida at the suggestion of her sister Jane. During the promotion of her autobiography on The Today Show in the spring of 2016, Tennille said the reason for their divorce was Dragon's "inability to be affectionate." In her memoir, Tennille revealed that despite their success and public image of a solid marriage, she was lonely and isolated. Dragon had been controlling and emotionally distant; throughout their relationship they slept in separate bedrooms. "I can say without exaggeration that he showed no physical affection for me during our very long marriage," she said. She reported that Dragon reacted positively to her memoir and the revelation by saying, "I saw you on The Today Show. I was proud of you."

Following their divorce, Tennille and Dragon remained friends until his death from kidney failure on January 2, 2019. Dragon stated in a February 2017 interview with People that Tennille had returned to Arizona to assist him following a serious health-related incident he had experienced the previous year.

== Discography ==
=== Studio albums ===
- More Than You Know (Mirage, 1984)
- Moonglow (Purebred, 1986)
- All of Me (Gaia, 1987)
- Do It Again (USA Music Group, 1988)
- Never Let Me Go (Bay Cities, 1991)
- Things Are Swingin (Purebred, 1994)
- Tennille Sings Big Band (Honest, 1996)
- Incurably Romantic (Varèse Sarabande, 2001)
