= Harrah's Reno =

Defunct casino hotel in Reno, Nevada, United States

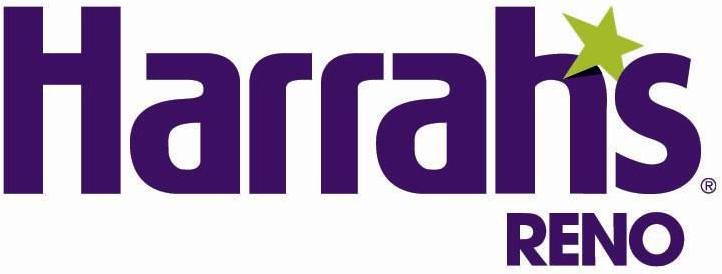

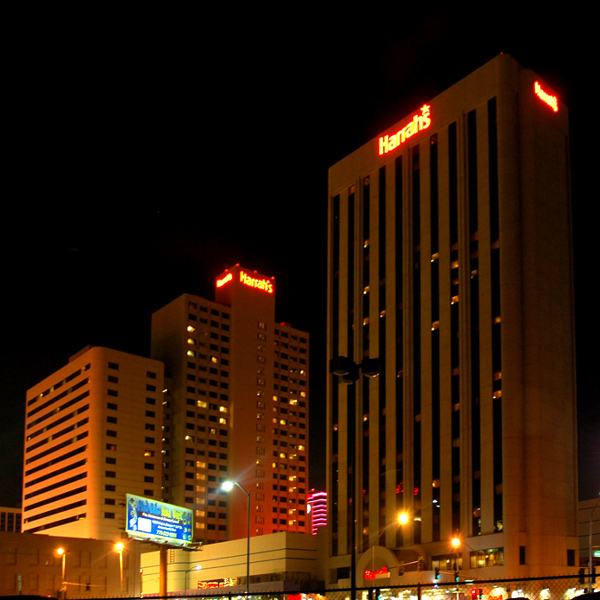
- Interactive map of Harrah's Reno
- Location: Reno, Nevada, U.S.; 219 North Center Street; 39.527536°N 119.812737°W
- Opened: October 29, 1937; 88 years ago
- Closed: March 17, 2020; 6 years ago
- Theme: Pavilion
- No. of rooms: 928
- Gaming space: 40,200 sq ft (3,730 m^{2})
- Signature attractions: Sammy's Showroom (formerly Headliner Room)
- Notable restaurants: Carvings Buffet (formerly Fresh Market Square Buffet); Harrah's Steak House; Hash House a go go (formerly Café Napa); Ichiban; Joy Luck Noodle Bar; Starbucks
- Casino type: Land-based
- Owner: Vici Properties
- Operating license holder: Caesars Entertainment (prior to the acquisition by Eldorado Resorts)
- Architect: Martin Stern Jr. and Associates; Worth Group
- Previous names: Harrah's Club
- Renovated in: 1967: Harrah's Steak House; 1969: West Tower; 1981: South Tower; 1995: East Tower; 1999: Café Napa; 2000: The Plaza; 2005: Ichiban, Quiznos and Starbucks; 2006: Carvings Buffet; 2011: Hash House a go go

Harrah's Reno is a former casino hotel in downtown Reno, Nevada.

It was credited for being the first property of the Harrah's casino chain, founded by William F. Harrah.

The site is currently owned by Madison Capital Group, a real estate developer based in Charlotte, North Carolina, which plans to redevelop the property into a mixed-use development dubbed Revival.

== History ==
William F. Harrah opened his first bingo parlor on October 29, 1937, but by December 1937, that parlor was closed. Harrah then spent the winter raising money and re-opened his casino, Harrah's Plaza Tango, which later became Harrah's Heart Tango. The Heart Tango location was between Virginia and Center streets, in the heart of the Reno casino action. Over time, Harrah slowly acquired neighboring casinos adjacent to his Virginia Street casino. Harrah slowly built his operation.

Harrah's was featured briefly in the 1961 movie The Misfits, the final film of its stars, Marilyn Monroe and Clark Gable.

In 1968, Harrah acquired The Reno Golden Hotel and contracted noted casino architect Martin Stern Jr. to create and construct a luxury 24–story hotel tower to build atop the bones of the former Grand Hotel. The tower opened on October 10, 1969. In 1981, a 100-room tower was added to the existing 24-story tower by the new owners, Holiday Inn.

Harrah's expanded sideways from their Virginia Street "Blackout Bar" location in 1956 when Pick Hobson's Frontier Club next door was acquired. Gaming space included the buildings across Lincoln Alley, where the 1969 hotel tower was added, and then the 1978 expansion across Center Street accessed via a two-story-high airway.

Once the Center Street casino opened, Harrah's had more than 2,000 slot machines on their combined three casino floors. In 1985 the properties boasted 105 table games, a 12-table poker room, and a sportsbook. The block where Harrah's first Tango club opened along Virginia Street once housed a dozen different casinos, including famous properties like the Bank Club and Harold's Club. As those casinos closed, Harrah's expanded their operations or razed the old clubs to make way for parking, meeting space, and open outdoor areas.

Harrah's had a showroom that hosted the same top headliners as those who appeared in Las Vegas, such as Joan Rivers, Smothers Brothers, Merle Haggard, Frank Sinatra, Wayne Newton, Captain and Tennille and Mitzi Gaynor. In 1991, after the death of Sammy Davis Jr., the Headliner Room name was changed to Sammy's Showroom. Davis had performed at Harrah's regularly and was the opening night act in the Headliner Room. Sammy's Showroom opened with a dual headliner and revue acts. Over the years, Sammy's Showroom was switched to a revue-show-only policy. Headliners in the first years of the rechristened Sammy's Showroom included Vic Damone, Tony Bennett, Rich Little, Phyllis Diller, Marilyn McCoo and Norm Crosby. The last headliner to appear in Sammy's Showroom was Gordie Brown in 2004.

In 1995, Harrah's Entertainment was spun off from Promus Hotel Company (formerly Holiday Inn) and built the world's largest Hampton Inn, one of its signature hotel brands, next door to the Reno hotel. The Reno Hampton Inn hotel opened in November 1995. The Hampton Inn at Harrah's Reno was connected to the casino floor and included its own hotel lobby, valet and meeting facilities. During the 1997 Nevada floods, both the Hampton Inn and Harrah's had to be closed due to water damage. In 1999, the Promus Company was sold to the Hilton Hotels Corporation. Harrah's acquired the 26-story Hampton addition and made that hotel a seamless part of Harrah's, adding 400 rooms to its room count. In 1999, Harrah's purchased the closed, aging Nevada Club and Harold's Club casinos, and soon imploded both to make room for a grand outdoor entertainment venue called The Plaza. Opened in 2000 as a concert venue, the first-year shows included Ray Charles, KC and the Sunshine Band and Chuck Berry. The VIP seats in The Plaza were given to casino guests and also sold. The area also had free seating. Concerts could be heard all along Virginia Street. Harrah's remodeled the East Tower in 2003 and the original West Tower from 2005 to 2006. Harrah's has left the famed Harrah's Steak House, its most recognizable restaurant that founder Harrah built on May 26, 1967, virtually untouched. Major interior casino and meeting room renovations took place in 1995, 1999, and 2006. Carvings Buffet opened on February 24, 2006, after the preceding Fresh Square Market Buffet closed in August 2005 for a $6 million renovation.

In early 2011, hotel management decided to invest in certain worn areas of the hotel property to refurbish them. Starting in late 2010, executive management decided to return to the use of "wall-wash" exterior lighting to bathe the hotel towers in bright purple, the official color of the Harrah's brand. In February 2011 it closed its eclectic, 24-hour Cafe Napa coffee shop opened in June 1999, and replaced it with a Hash House a Go Go restaurant.

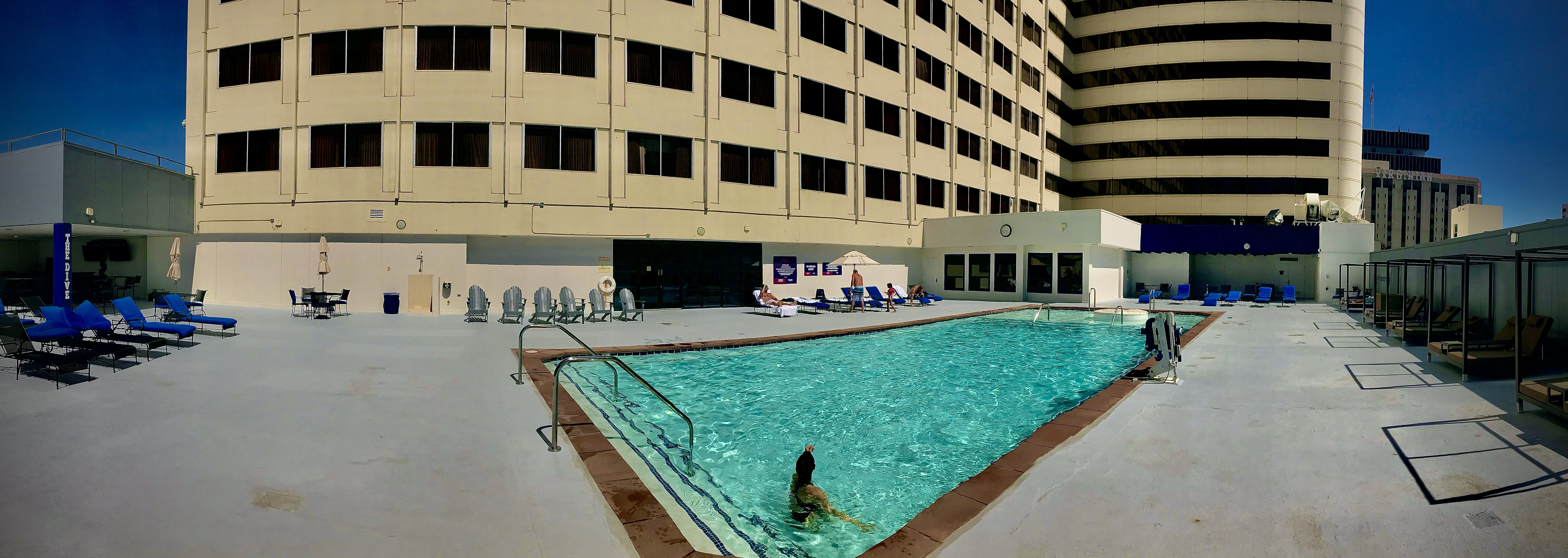
Pool area on the fifth floor (2019)

On October 6, 2017, ownership of the Harrah's Reno property was transferred to Vici Properties as part of a corporate spin-off and it was leased back to Caesars Entertainment.

The East Tower was remodeled once again in 2018 to attract younger millennials. An adult-only arcade was added, featuring pool, arcade basketball, air hockey, and video games.

=== Reno City Center ===
In January 2020, Caesars and Vici announced that they would sell Harrah's Reno to CAI Investments, a Las Vegas-based real estate firm. CAI intended to close the property and convert it into a non-gaming hotel, along with mixed-use development. During the COVID-19 pandemic, Harrah's Reno was among businesses that were ordered by Governor Steve Sisolak to close on March 17, 2020, to prevent the spread of the virus. In June 2020, Caesars announced that it would not reopen Harrah's Reno. The sale was finalized in September, with Vici receiving 75 percent of the $41.5 million sale price, and Caesars receiving the other 25 percent. CAI will rename the property Reno City Center. It will include 540 apartments.

In 2023, construction on the Reno City Center project began with over 30 different active building permits being pulled for the development. Since the launch of the project it has encountered numerous delays. Construction on the courtyard was delayed when Clear Capital pulled its $20 million out of the project. The project was further delayed for over two months when Fine Entertainment and the Reno City Council were at odds over slot machines being a part of the PKWY Tavern restaurant space. The city council approved 197 slot machines at Reno City Center in September 2023. The Nevada Gaming Commission had already approved a gaming license for the project prior to the Reno City Council vote. The development has also encountered difficulties and delays due to asbestos remediation in the building.

In January 2024, the project encountered financial trouble when a notice of default was placed on the property for $104.4 million. A similar notice was placed on the property in June 2023, but it never proceeded to auction as the developer, Gryphon Private Wealth Management, negotiated with its lenders.

On February 16, 2024, Gryphon's Reno City Center Owner (RCCO) LLC filed for Chapter 11 bankruptcy.

A U.S. Bankruptcy Court judge on February 26, 2025, dismissed the bankruptcy of the stalled project, and Gryphon-RCCO met the February 28 deadline to pay its lenders $37.5 million to avoid foreclosure.
