= Love Will Keep Us Together (album) =

Studio album by Captain & Tennille
- Released: May 23, 1975
- Recorded: 1973, 1974-1975
- Genre: Pop rock
- Label: A&M
- Producers: Daryl Dragon; Morgan Cavett on "Disney Girls" and "The Way I Want to Touch You"

Captain & Tennille chronology
Love Will Keep Us Together (1975)	Song of Joy (1976)

Singles from Love Will Keep Us Together
- 1. "Love Will Keep Us Together" Released: 1975; 2. "The Way I Want to Touch You" Released: September 1975

Love Will Keep Us Together is the debut album by the duo Captain & Tennille. It was released in 1975 by A&M Records. The album would peak at No. 2 on the Billboard 200 album chart, while the title song, "Love Will Keep Us Together", won the Grammy Award for Record of the Year and was nominated for Song of the Year.

The cover of the album features a photo of Toni Tennille and Daryl Dragon sitting with two of their bulldogs.

Professional ratings
Review scores
Source	Rating
AllMusic	3/5 stars
Christgau's Record Guide	D−

In addition to the usual 2-channel stereo version the album was also released in a 4-channel quadraphonic mix on LP record and 8-track tape. The quad LP was encoded using the CD-4 system.

== Songs ==
The title song from the album, "Love Will Keep Us Together", was written by Neil Sedaka and Howard Greenfield, first appearing on Sedaka's 1973 LP The Tra-La Days Are Over.

The Captain & Tennille cover (A&M 1672-S b/w "Gentle Stranger") would reach No. 1 on the Billboard Hot 100 for the week ending June 21, 1975. It spent four weeks at number one and was ranked by Billboard as the number one single of the year, and also spent one week at number one on the Adult Contemporary chart. "The Way I Want to Touch You" (A&M 1725 b/w "Broddy Bounce") became another million-seller, reaching #4 on the Hot 100 and topping the AC chart for two weeks. Both tracks were also top 40 hits in the U.K. although they did not replicate their Stateside success there.

Dragon and Tennille first met in 1971 while Dragon was keyboardist for The Beach Boys, whom Tennille would soon join as an additional keyboardist. The album includes three songs written or co-written by (and for) The Beach Boys: "Cuddle Up", which was co-written by Dennis Wilson and Daryl Dragon in 1972; "God Only Knows", co-written by Brian Wilson; and "Disney Girls", written by Bruce Johnston.

The album includes the first album release of the song "I Write the Songs", also written by Beach Boy Bruce Johnston. Later in 1975, Barry Manilow released a version of the song which became a No. 1 Billboard Hot 100 hit.

== Track listing ==
1. "Love Will Keep Us Together" (Neil Sedaka, Howard Greenfield)
2. "Disney Girls" (Bruce Johnston)
3. "The Way I Want to Touch You" (Toni Tennille)
4. "Cuddle Up" (Daryl Dragon, Dennis Wilson)
5. "The Good Songs" (Toni Tennille, Daryl Dragon)
6. "God Only Knows" (Brian Wilson, Tony Asher)
7. "Honey Come Love Me" (Toni Tennille, Daryl Dragon)
8. "Feel Like a Man" (Toni Tennille, Daryl Dragon)
9. "Broddy Bounce" (Daryl Dragon)
10. "Gentle Stranger" (Toni Tennille)
11. "I Write the Songs" (Bruce Johnston)

== Por Amor Viviremos ==
While the song "Love Will Keep Us Together" was topping the charts in the summer of 1975, Captain & Tennille released a Spanish version of the song, "Por Amor Viviremos" (A&M 1715-S). "Por Amor Viviremos" rose to number 49 on the Billboard Hot 100 chart, inspiring them to release their May 1976 album Por Amor Viviremos (A&M SP-4561), a Spanish track-for-track rerecording of their Love Will Keep Us Together album.

Track listing (Spanish Version)

1. "Por Amor Viviremos" (Neil Sedaka, Howard Greenfield)
2. "Mi Mundo Irreal" (Bruce Johnston)
3. "Como Yo Quiero Sentirte" (Toni Tennille)
4. "Vivir Asi" (Daryl Dragon, Dennis Wilson)
5. "Mis Canciones" (Toni Tennille, Daryl Dragon)
6. "Lo Sabe Dios" (Brian Wilson, Tony Asher)
7. "No Te Levantes" (Toni Tennille, Daryl Dragon)
8. "Sentir Señor" (Toni Tennille, Daryl Dragon)
9. "El Rebote de Broddy" (Daryl Dragon)
10. "Dulce Extraño" (Toni Tennille)
11. "Es La Canción" (Bruce Johnston)

== Personnel ==
According to the original liner notes

- Daryl Dragon (The Captain) - lead vocals and backing vocals, ARP Odyssey, Minimoog, piano, clavinet, Wurlitzer electric piano, Hammond organ, celesta, ARP Solina, bass and chimes
- Toni Tennille - lead vocals and backing vocals, piano
- Hal Blaine - drums, congas and tambourine
- Michael Price - trumpet
- Kenneth Yerke - violin
- Jane Tennille, Louisa Tennille, Melissa Tennille - backing vocals
- Dennis Dragon - drums on "Disney Girls", timpani on "God Only Knows"
- Ed Greene - drums on "The Way I Want to Touch You"
