= The Other Side of Me (Neil Sedaka song) =

Single by Andy Williams

from the album The Other Side of Me
- B-side: "Goin' Through the Motions"
- Released: March 1976
- Genre: Pop
- Length: 3:19
- Label: CBS Records 3903
- Songwriter(s): Neil Sedaka, Howard Greenfield
- Producer(s): Jack Gold

Andy Williams singles chronology
"Sad Eyes" (1975)	"The Other Side of Me" (1976)	"Tell It Like It Is" (1976)

"The Other Side of Me" is a pop song written by Neil Sedaka and Howard Greenfield. Sedaka's version of the song was released on his 1973 UK album The Tra-La Days Are Over. Donny Osmond also released an album version of the song in 1973, on Alone Together, and it was the title track of Vince Hill's 1973 LP.

The song also appears on Shirley Bassey's 1975 album Good, Bad but Beautiful and Crystal Gayle's 1979 album Miss the Mississippi. Andy Williams recorded "The Other Side of Me" for his 1975 album of the same name; it was released as single and made the UK charts at #42 in March 1976.

== Chart history ==
Andy Williams

Chart (1976)	Peak position
UK	42
