= Love Will Keep Us Together =

1973 song by Neil Sedaka

Song by Neil Sedaka

from the album The Tra-La Days Are Over
- Released: 1973
- Recorded: Spring 1973
- Studio: Strawberry (Stockport, England)
- Genre: Pop
- Label: MGM
- Producers: Neil Sedaka, 10cc

Lyric video
- "Love Will Keep Us Together" on YouTube

"Love Will Keep Us Together" is a song written by Neil Sedaka and Howard Greenfield. It was first recorded by Sedaka in 1973. The brother-sister duo Mac and Katie Kissoon also recorded a version in 1973. American pop duo Captain & Tennille covered it in 1975; their version became a worldwide hit.

== Composition ==
Sedaka admitted lifting the main chord progression from "Do It Again" by the Beach Boys and added a progression including augmented chords inspired by Al Green. The melody was written with Diana Ross in mind. Greenfield wrote the lyrics as one of the two final collaborations with Sedaka (they had decided reluctantly to break off their partnership because their songs were no longer commercially viable) along with "Our Last Song Together," before Greenfield moved to Los Angeles with his companion Tory Damon.

== Background ==
"Love Will Keep Us Together" first appeared on Neil Sedaka's 1973 studio album The Tra-La Days Are Over, which did not have a U.S. release. His version of the song made its U.S. album debut on the 1974 compilation album Sedaka's Back. Sedaka never released the song as a single in North America; he acknowledged in 1976 that it was because he was more eager to promote his song "The Immigrant," believing it to be a more meaningful record, only to be met with resistance from radio stations that were unwilling to play that more controversial record; he acknowledged that, once the Captain & Tennille had a major hit with "Love Will Keep Us Together" at the same time "The Immigrant" was languishing, he had made a bad misjudgment in choosing "The Immigrant" as a single instead of "Love Will Keep Us Together." In West Germany, Sedaka's original song was also included as the B side of his 1976 hit "Love in the Shadows".

In 2009, Neil Sedaka rerecorded a spoof of his song, renaming it "Lunch Will Keep Us Together" for his first children's CD Waking Up Is Hard to Do.

== Personnel ==
- Neil Sedaka – vocals, piano, organ, electric piano
- Lol Creme – vocals, guitar
- Eric Stewart – vocals, guitar, recording engineer
- Graham Gouldman – vocals, bass, guitar
- Kevin Godley – vocals, drums, percussion

== Mac and Katie Kissoon version ==
"Love Will Keep Us Together" had its first single release via a UK recording by the brother-and-sister vocal duo Mac and Katie Kissoon on September 28, 1973, but it failed to chart. This version also failed to chart in its U.S. release in February 1974, but it did become the first hit version of "Love Will Keep Us Together" by virtue of charting in the Netherlands in the autumn of 1973, peaking at number 12 that December.

== Captain & Tennille version ==
"Love Will Keep Us Together"

Single by Captain & Tennille

from the album Love Will Keep Us Together
- B-side: "Gentle Stranger"
- Released: April 1975
- Recorded: 1975
- Genre: Soft rock
- Length: 3:24
- Label: A&M
- Songwriters: Neil Sedaka, Howard Greenfield
- Producer: Daryl Dragon

Captain & Tennille singles chronology
"Love Will Keep Us Together" (1975)	"The Way I Want to Touch You" (1975)

Audio video
- "Love Will Keep Us Together" on YouTube

"Love Will Keep Us Together" was the title cut and lead single of Captain & Tennille's debut album, although "Captain" Daryl Dragon originally hoped that honor would go to the duo's rendition of "I Write the Songs". The single rose to number one on both the Billboard Easy Listening chart and the Billboard pop chart, staying atop the latter for four weeks starting June 21, 1975. It was also number one on the year-end chart. In the U.S., it was the best-selling single of 1975. "Love Will Keep Us Together" was certified gold by the RIAA and also won the Grammy Award for Record of the Year on February 28, 1976.

Record World said the song "is a solid choice of material for the label to propel this duo into Carpenter-ish acceptance." "Captain" Daryl Dragon played all the instruments on this version, with the exception of drums played by Hal Blaine.

Dragon and Tennille acknowledged Sedaka's authorship—as well as his mid-1970s comeback—by working the phrase "Sedaka is back" into the song's fadeout, where the applause from the studio musicians can be heard. Their version earned Sedaka and Greenfield a Grammy nomination for Song of the Year. Twenty years later in 1995, the duo re-recorded the song for their Twenty Years of Romance CD.

=== "Por Amor Viviremos" (Spanish version) ===
While "Love Will Keep Us Together" was topping the charts in the summer of 1975, Captain & Tennille released a Spanish version of the song, "Por Amor Viviremos", which rose to number 49 on the Billboard Hot 100 chart, giving Captain & Tennille a rare feat of the identical song, in different languages and released as separate singles (rather than the A-side and B-side of one single), appearing simultaneously on the Billboard Hot 100. Chicago radio station WLS AM 890 used the two versions to create a Spanglish version of the song for their own broadcasting use.

"Por Amor Viviremos" later appeared on their May 1976 album Por Amor Viviremos, a Spanish track-for-track rerecording of their album Love Will Keep Us Together. It also appears on the 2002 Hip-O Records compilation album Ultimate Collection: The Complete Hits.

=== Personnel ===
- Toni Tennille – lead and backing vocals
- Daryl Dragon – piano, electric piano, synthesizers, clavinet, bass, arrangement
- Hal Blaine – drums

=== Chart performance ===
==== Weekly charts ====
Chart (1975–1976)	Peak position
Australia (Kent Music Report)	1
Canada Top Singles (RPM)	1
Canadian RPM Adult Contemporary	1
French Singles Chart	6
New Zealand (Recorded Music NZ)	8
South Africa (Springbok Radio)	2
UK Singles (Official Charts)	32
US Billboard Hot 100	1

==== Year-end charts ====
Chart (1975)	Rank
Australia (Kent Music Report)	6
Brazil (ABPD)	19
Canada RPM Top Singles	1
Canada RPM Adult Contemporary	14
New Zealand	22
South Africa	16
US Billboard Hot 100	1
US Billboard Easy Listening	7
US Cash Box	1

== Other notable versions ==
- Wilson Pickett recorded "Love Will Keep Us Together" for his 1976 studio album release Chocolate Mountain from which it was issued as a single. It reached number 69 on the Billboard R&B chart.
- In 1978, the song was covered by Timothy Dalton and Mae West in West's final movie Sextette.
- In 1979, Ginger Rogers sang this song in an episode of The Love Boat.
- In 1980, Joy Division released "Love Will Tear Us Apart", also recorded at Strawberry Studios, Stockport, the title of which "was intended as an ironic nod to the classic '70s pop song."
- In 1982, the song featured heavily in Troma comedy Stuck on You!, performed by the band Junk Rock.
- In 1992, Mexican trio Pandora released a cover version titled "Pierdo el Control" on their album Ilegal.
- In 2001, the film Get Over It featured a dance to this song at the beginning by some of the cast.
