= Daryl Dragon =

American musician (1942–2019)

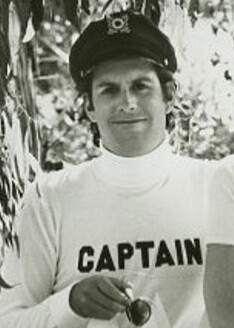
- Dragon in 1976

Background information
- Also known as: Captain, Rumbo
- Born: Daryl Frank Dragon; August 27, 1942; Los Angeles, California, U.S.
- Died: January 2, 2019 (aged 76) Prescott, Arizona, U.S.
- Occupations: Musician; songwriter
- Instruments: Piano; keyboards; bass; guitar; percussion
- Years active: 1959–2013
- Labels: A&M, Casablanca
- Formerly of: Captain & Tennille

Daryl Frank Dragon (August 27, 1942 – January 2, 2019) was an American musician known as Captain from the pop musical duo Captain & Tennille with his wife, Toni Tennille.

== Early life ==
Born into a musical family, Dragon was the son of Eloise (Rawitzer) and conductor, composer, and arranger Carmen Dragon, and the elder brother of Dennis Dragon, a member of the 1960s pop combo the Dragons and the 1980s surf band the Surf Punks. His godfather was actor and comedian Danny Thomas.

In 1962, Dragon became a member of the band Charles Wright and the Wright Sounds, which included the future Watts Band member John Raynford. Dragon studied piano at San Fernando Valley State College from 1963–1966, dropping out to form a band with his brothers. He also played with The Yellow Balloon in 1967.

== Career ==
=== Early career ===
In 1968, Dragon and his brother Dennis formed a studio band called the Mission, which produced a one-off single on the small Bet Records label: "Calmilly"/"Galing Made It". The songs later appeared on a joint album in 1971 titled Me and My Brother (aided by another brother, Doug, who sang the vocals). The album was released on CD in 2005.

In the late 1960s, Daryl and his brothers Doug and Dennis recorded sessions for a psychedelic soul/rock album as "the Dragons", but they were unable to get a record label to release the album. The album was titled BFI, which stood for "Blue Forces Intelligence". In 2007, UK label Ninja Tune discovered that the recording engineer, Donn Landee, still had the master tapes and they released the album.

Dragon contributed vibes and melodica in the song "Wind 'n' Sea" by the band Farm, a group assembled by his brothers Dennis and Doug for the soundtrack to The Innermost Limits of Pure Fun (1970), a surf film directed by George Greenough.

Dragon's familiar image and stage name came from his time as a keyboard player with the Beach Boys from 1967 to 1972. Beach Boys lead singer Mike Love gave him the nickname "Captain Keyboard", and it stuck; Dragon began wearing a nautical captain's hat to go along with the name. On Bob Smith's 1970 double LP The Visit, Dragon is credited as Captain Keyboard.

Dragon arranged the coda of the Beach Boys' song "Don't Go Near The Water" from the 1971 release Surf's Up. Dragon also made significant contributions with keyboarding and musical scoring on the Beach Boys' 1972 release Carl and the Passions – "So Tough"; he co-wrote the track "Cuddle Up" with Dennis Wilson. Also, Dragon's orchestrations on the tracks "Make It Good" and "Cuddle Up" translated the melodic ideas that Wilson was seeking.

Dragon served as musical director for the Beach Boys' concert on September 22, 1971, at The Ramada Inn in Portsmouth, Rhode Island. The concert was the first-ever appearance of South African musicians Ricky Fataar and Blondie Chaplin in the band, essentially changing the Beach Boys' live act into a multi-cultural group. A plaque featuring Dragon's name was unveiled by Roger Williams University and music historians Al Gomes and Connie Watrous of Big Noise at the Baypoint Inn & Conference Center in Portsmouth on September 21, 2017, honoring The Beach Boys for a significant historic event in their career.

In 1971, Dragon met his future wife Toni Tennille in San Francisco during auditions for the play, Mother Earth. After Mother Earth ended, Dragon returned to the Beach Boys and introduced Tennille to the band, who hired her to play electric piano with the band during their 1972 tour.

=== Captain & Tennille ===
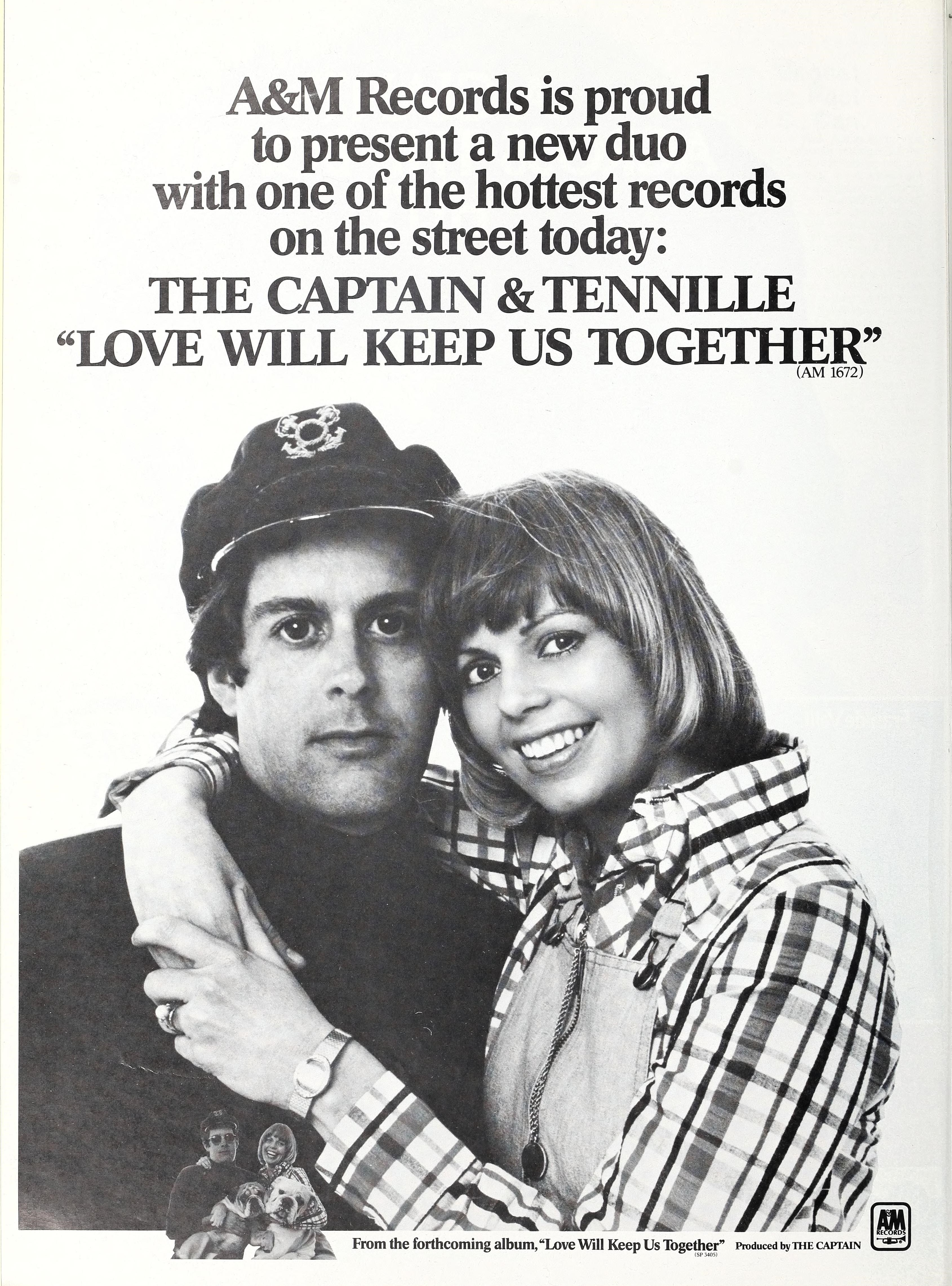
Cashbox advertisement, May 17, 1975

After the conclusion of the Beach Boys tour, Tennille and Dragon began performing as a duo at a restaurant in Encino, California, eventually naming the act Captain & Tennille. They self-financed the recording of Tennille's song "The Way I Want to Touch You", and the song became popular on a Los Angeles radio station, leading to several offers from record companies and a record contract with A&M Records.

In 1975, the title track from the duo's debut studio album, Love Will Keep Us Together, topped the Billboard pop chart for four weeks starting June 21, 1975, as well as the 1975 year-end chart. In the US it was the best-selling single of 1975. "Love Will Keep Us Together" won the Grammy Award (1975) for Record of the Year on February 28, 1976.

Such was the level of their popularity that they were given their own television variety show, The Captain and Tennille, which featured Tennille and Dragon performing musical numbers and comedy sketches with various guest stars. The show aired from September 1976 to March 1977 on ABC. As Captain in Captain & Tennille, Dragon was frequently silent and a man of very few words, playing a foil to his outgoing, vivacious wife.

Over the next few years, Captain & Tennille released a string of hit singles mostly from their first two albums Love Will Keep Us Together (US #2, 1975) and Song Of Joy (US #9, 1976) including "The Way I Want to Touch You" (US #4), "Lonely Night (Angel Face)" (US #3), "Shop Around" (US #4), and "Muskrat Love" (US #4). In 1979, "Do That to Me One More Time" became Captain & Tennille's second #1 hit. Between 1975 and 1982, Dragon would record seven studio albums with the duo.

Throughout the 1990s, Dragon and Tennille continued to perform various concert dates at venues around the world, frequently at Harrah's Lake Tahoe and Harrah's Reno, which were located close to their home near Carson City, Nevada.

In 2005, he recorded the Christmas song "Saving Up Christmas" with Tennille as Captain & Tennille, and the song was included in The Ultimate Collection DVD box set. This was followed by a full-length Christmas album titled The Secret of Christmas, released in 2007.

=== Other session work ===
In 1981, Dragon contributed to the Carpenters' Made In America album, programming synthesizers on "(Want You) Back In My Life Again".

Dragon also contributed additional keyboards/synthesizers on Survivor's albums Premonition (1981), Eye of the Tiger (1982), and Caught in the Game (1983), with all three albums being recorded at Rumbo Recorders, the recording studio founded by Dragon and Tennille in 1977. Dragon also did session work with his brother Dennis for the Go for It soundtrack (1995).

In 1997, he contributed synthesizers to five songs for punk band Size 14's self-titled debut. This collaboration occurred while the band was recording at Dragon's own Rumbo Recorders studio. The album included sexually explicit lyrics which Dragon was not aware of, as the band didn't have the vocals down yet when he was recording with them.

== Personal life ==
Dragon suffered from megalocornea, a condition which results in the enlargement of the transparent front part of the eye and iris. It forced him to wear ever-present sunglasses.

=== Neurological condition ===
In late 2009, Toni Tennille announced her husband had developed familial tremor. According to Tennille, his condition was neither debilitating nor terminal. Rather, his noticeable tremor was exacerbated by stress and anxiety. Subsequently, the tremor condition limited most of Dragon's public appearances. In November 2009, Toni Tennille announced that Dragon was under a physician's care to determine the best method of his treatment.

In September 2010, Tennille publicly clarified her husband's condition as "a neurological condition (later confirmed to be essential tremor), which causes him to have tremors". Tennille indicated the condition was debilitating to Dragon's abilities as a musician.

Tennille had reported on her blog in 2010 that her husband's neurological condition was characterized by such extreme tremors he could no longer play keyboards.

=== Divorce ===
Tennille filed for divorce from Dragon in Arizona on January 16, 2014, after 39 years of marriage. Dragon stated he was unaware of this until he was served with the divorce papers. Dragon, contacted by TMZ on January 22, 2014, stated: "I don't know why Toni filed for divorce." On January 23, 2014, The Washington Post reported health insurance related to health issues might be the reason for the divorce, as both issues had been referenced in divorce documents filed with the courts.

The divorce was finalized in July 2014. In her memoirs, Tennille described their marriage as loveless and lacking physical affection. Regarding his ex-wife's new memoirs, Dragon stated, "No, I haven't read it." In an interview on March 17, 2016, Dragon, responding to the book by his ex-wife, would only comment that "I was drugged [at the time of the divorce] — that's all I can tell you."

On April 12, 2016, while appearing on the Today show, Tennille confirmed her divorce from Dragon was finalized and stated the reason for the divorce was Dragon's "inability to be affectionate". Tennille later said that Dragon had reacted positively to the Today segment and told her: "I saw you on The Today Show. I was proud of you."

In an interview published in a February 2017 issue of People, Dragon stated he was making great progress and feeling like himself again, after corrections were made in the dosage of medications he was taking, which had been causing side effects. Dragon stated his ex-wife had flown to Arizona and had been a help in his improvement.

=== Death ===
Dragon died on January 2, 2019, from kidney failure in Prescott, Arizona, aged 76, with Tennille by his side.
