= Captain & Tennille =

American pop rock duo

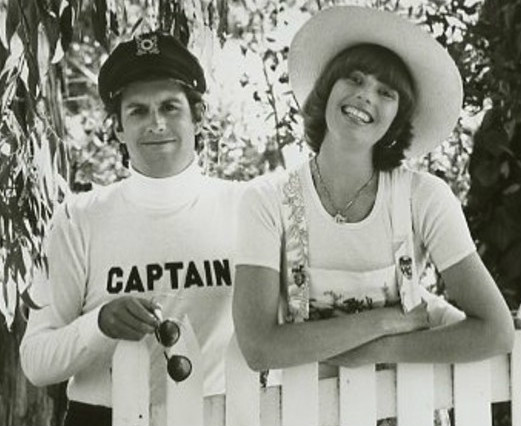
- Captain and Tennille, 1976

Background information
- Origin: Los Angeles, California, U.S.
- Genres: Pop, soft rock
- Years active: 1972–2013
- Labels: A&M, Casablanca, Mirage
- Past members: Daryl Dragon; Toni Tennille

Captain & Tennille were an American recording duo most popular in the 1970s. The husband-and-wife team were "Captain" Daryl Dragon (1942–2019) and Toni Tennille (born 1940). They have five albums certified gold or platinum and scored numerous hits on the US singles charts, the most enduring of which included "Love Will Keep Us Together", "Do That to Me One More Time", and "Muskrat Love". They hosted their own television variety series on ABC in 1976–77.

== History ==
=== Background and early collaboration ===
In 1972, Toni Tennille was the co-writer of an ecology-themed musical, Mother Earth. At that time, Daryl Dragon (son of composer Carmen Dragon) played keyboards as a member of the Beach Boys, where he got his stage name "Captain Keyboard" because he wore a ship captain's hat while performing. When Tennille's show was preparing to move from San Francisco's Marines Memorial Theatre to Southern California's South Coast Repertory, a call was put out for a replacement keyboardist. Dragon was between tours when he heard about the opening, met Tennille in San Francisco to audition, and landed the gig.

Dragon later reciprocated by recommending Tennille to the Beach Boys when the band needed an additional keyboardist, and they hired her. She toured with them for a year, and has since been known as the Beach Boys' one and only "Beach Girl."

Realizing their collaborative potential when the tour was over, Tennille and Dragon began performing as a duo, The Dragons, at the Smokehouse Restaurant in Encino, California. They started to become popular in the Los Angeles area and, borrowing on Daryl's Beach Boys nickname, renamed their act to the more dynamic Captain & Tennille. Their early version of the Tennille-penned "The Way I Want to Touch You" became popular on a local radio station which led to several offers from a number of record companies. They ultimately decided to sign a recording contract with A&M Records.

=== Mainstream success ===
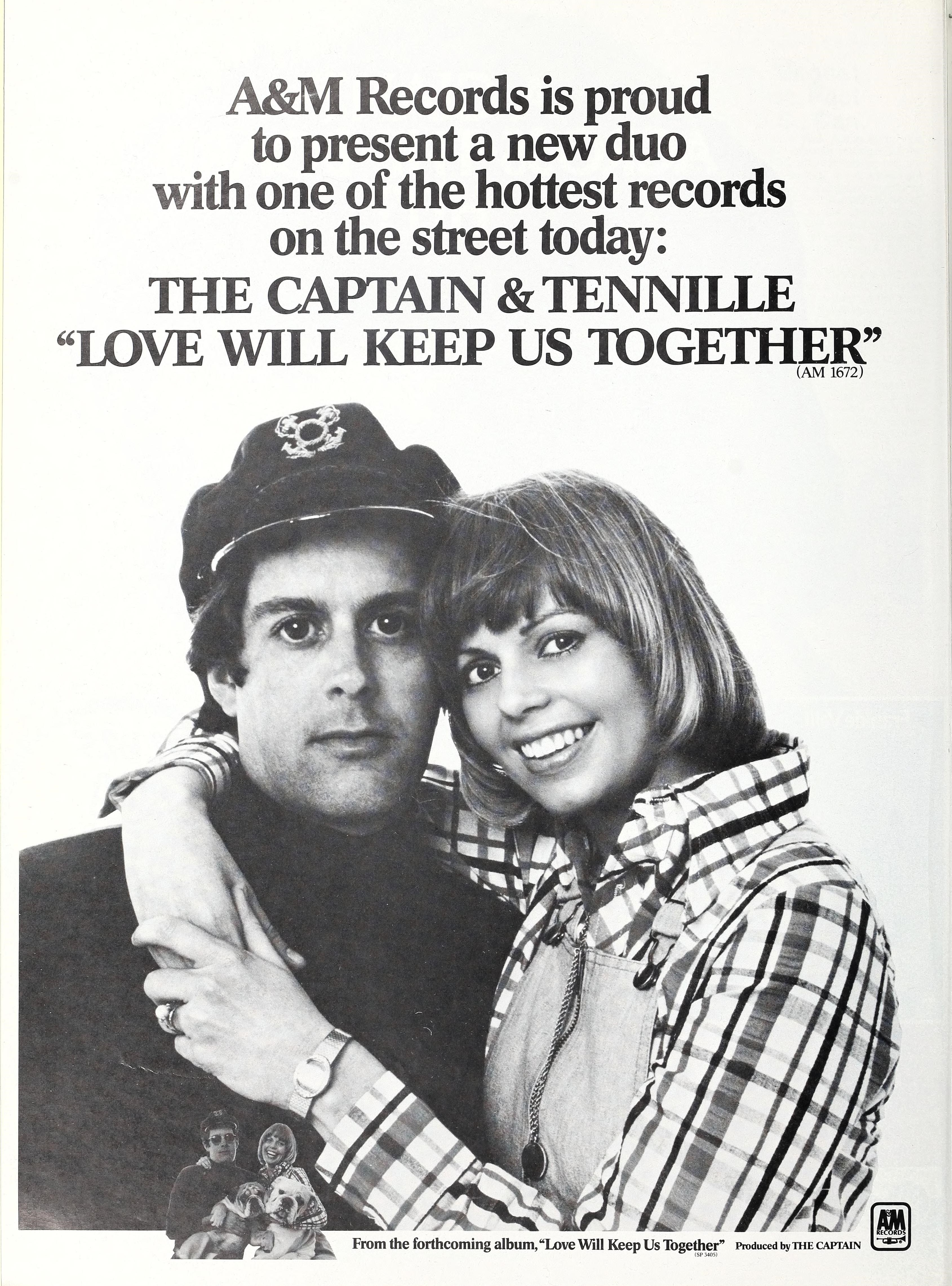
Cashbox advertisement, May 17, 1975

Their first hit single, a rendition of Neil Sedaka and Howard Greenfield's "Love Will Keep Us Together", reached #1 on the Billboard Hot 100 singles chart nine weeks after its 1975 debut, and went on to win the Grammy Award for Record of the Year. It sold over 1 million copies and was awarded a Gold disc by the RIAA on July 1, 1975. Tennille paid tribute to Sedaka in the recording when she sang the overdub "Sedaka is back" at the ending. The duo successfully mined the Sedaka songbook a number of times over their career. Two of their other hit singles were the Sedaka co-writes "Lonely Night (Angel Face)" and "You Never Done It Like That". Their Spanish recording of "Love Will Keep Us Together", "Por Amor Viviremos", also charted in 1975; it was the first time two versions of the same single charted simultaneously. Tennille and Dragon included renditions of several other Sedaka songs on their albums.

Tennille and Dragon married on November 11, 1975. A wedding date of Valentine's Day 1974 had long been erroneously reported: On their television variety show, Tennille claimed they were married on Valentine's Day, as did the February 14, 1976, edition of Casey Kasem's American Top 40 radio show.

Over the next few years, Captain & Tennille released a string of hit singles mostly from their first two albums Love Will Keep Us Together (US #2, 1975) and Song Of Joy (US #9, 1976) including "The Way I Want to Touch You" (US #4), "Lonely Night (Angel Face)" (US #3), "Shop Around" (US #4), and "Muskrat Love" (US #4).

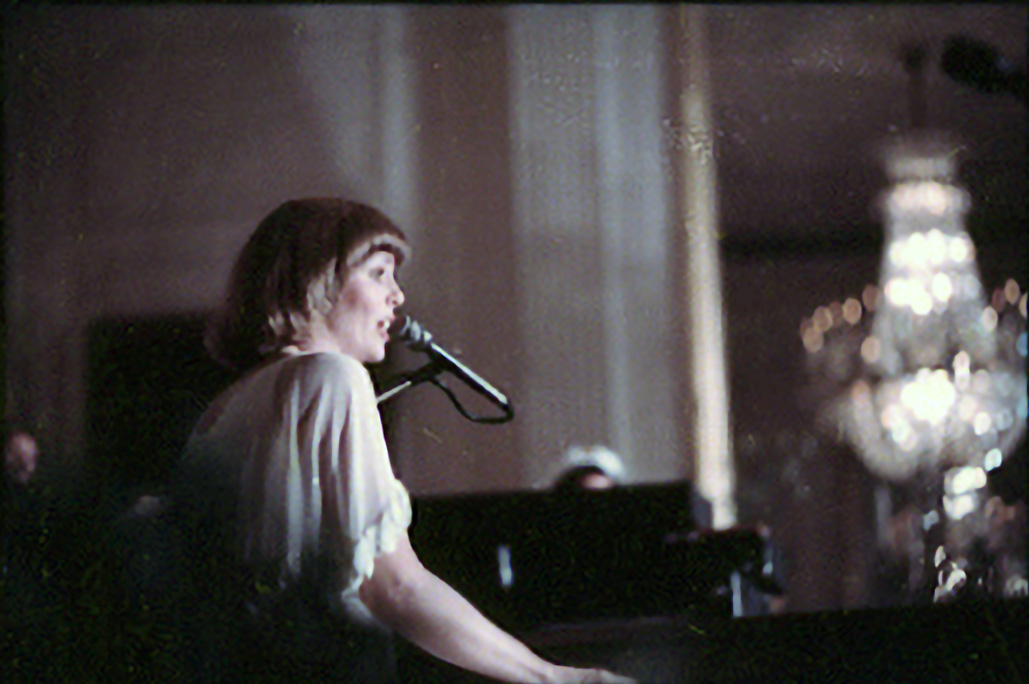
Tennille performing at the White House, 1976

In July 1976, they were invited by First Lady Betty Ford to perform in the East Room of the White House in the presence of Queen Elizabeth II and President Gerald Ford during the country's bicentennial celebration.

Such was the level of their popularity that they were given their own television variety show. The Captain and Tennille TV show aired from September 1976 to March 1977 on ABC. It featured musical numbers and comedy sketches performed with various guest stars. The show finished in the Nielsen ratings tied at 41 for the 1976-77 season with The Rockford Files and Chico and the Man. Despite decent ratings, it ranked #19 among the network's shows and was canceled by ABC. Other, lower ranking shows on the network were renewed. The cancellation likely was the result of the duo's desire to get out of their contract to focus on their music career.

The duo's third album Come in from the Rain (US #18, 1977) produced three singles: "Can't Stop Dancing" (US #13), the title track (US #61), and "Circles", which did not chart. A&M Records later released a Greatest Hits album (1977) which peaked at #55 on the US Top 200.

The duo released their fourth studio album Dream (US #131, 1978), although their first single "I'm on My Way" (US #74) failed to become a hit. However, their second single, and third Sedaka title, "You Never Done It Like That," fared much better at #10. A third single was "You Need a Woman Tonight" (US #40). Dream would be the last Captain and Tennille studio album released by A&M.

In 1979, Neil Bogart signed them to a contract on his Casablanca Records label. The album Make Your Move (US #23, 1979) rose much higher on the chart than the act's previous release, and the first single "Do That to Me One More Time" reached the summit on February 16, 1980, becoming their second #1 single. However, subsequent singles "Love on a Shoestring" (US #55) and "Happy Together (A Fantasy)" (US #53) only achieved minimal success.

Keeping Our Love Warm (1980) was the duo's second Casablanca release, and sixth studio album overall, but failed to crack the Top 200. The first single from this album, the title track, was performed live (although lip synced) during the 1980 Macy's Thanksgiving Day Parade.

=== Later career ===
Throughout the 1990s, they continued to perform various concert dates at venues around the world, frequently at Harrah's Lake Tahoe and Harrah's Reno, which were located close to their home near Carson City, Nevada. One of their more notable appearances in that decade occurred when they played at the House of Blues on the Sunset Strip in Los Angeles in 1995, as part of their 20th anniversary as an act.

In 1999, on Cartoon Network, the duo made a guest appearance, interviewed by Harvey Birdman, rather than Space Ghost (who is sent to jail and breaks out) in an episode of Space Ghost Coast to Coast.

In 2000 Captain & Tennille were to have embarked on a 25th anniversary tour; however, the stresses of the road proved too demanding, and they instead put an indefinite hold on their career as a performing duo. Nevertheless, Captain & Tennille's popularity remained evident in the release of their Ultimate Collection: The Complete Hits on Hip-O Records (a subsidiary of Universal Records) in 2001, and More Than Dancing... Much More, a 2002 compact disc. The latter contains what was originally their final album in 1982, More Than Dancing, which at that time was released only in Australia, and is combined with selected tracks from their 1995 20 Years of Romance, originally on K-Tel (re-recording of their songs, and cover versions of others), as well as five newly released tracks.

In November 2003, Tennille performed a benefit concert for the Reno, Nevada Chamber Orchestra, where her surprise guest was Dragon. It was the first time they had publicly performed as Captain & Tennille in many years. Their first live recording, An Intimate Evening with Toni Tennille, was released to commemorate the event. The same year, Tennille's voice returned to the UK airwaves and to club play when the band Bent sampled a small portion of her vocals from Captain & Tennille's 1979 track, "Love on a Shoestring" (from the album Make Your Move), into their "Magic Love" single. An Ashley Beedle remix of the single heightened the danceability of the original ambient track.

In 2005, Brant Berry, the vice president of a small Portland, Oregon–based entertainment company, Respond 2 Entertainment (R2), signed an agreement with Captain & Tennille to release three projects. The first was the home video release of Captain & Tennille's 1976 television variety series, on a three-disc DVD set containing 11 complete episodes with bonus musical tracks. Second, R2 re-released newly remastered CDs of all six of the duo's studio albums, both from the original A&M and Casablanca labels. Several of the CDs were previously available only in Japan. The new CDs, packaged both as individual CDs and in a box set, contained new liner notes written by Tennille.

The third R2 project was the release of a new recording by Captain & Tennille–a three-song Christmas CD entitled Saving Up Christmas. This effort was followed by The Secret of Christmas, Captain & Tennille's first complete original album produced in more than a decade, and their first-ever Christmas album. Released on Captain & Tennille's own label, Purebred Records, on November 1, 2007, it would also become the duo's final studio album.

In October 2006, Cartoon Network's animated special Casper's Scare School was aired. The duo recorded two songs for the film, and voiced the dialog for the characters who sang the songs. Tennille portrayed Aunt Belle and the Captain was Uncle Murray, who together formed a two-head-on-one-body being known as the Ankle. The two songs they performed, "Why Does Love Make Me Feel So Good" and "World Without Fear," were written by Magnus Fiennes. Captain & Tennille's co-stars on the show included Phyllis Diller, James Belushi, Dan Castellaneta, and Bob Saget.

In 2007, three new DVDs were released of Captain & Tennille's ABC TV specials: Captain & Tennille in Hawaii, Captain & Tennille in New Orleans, and Captain & Tennille Songbook.

== Personal lives ==
Dragon and Tennille spent most of the 1990s and 2000s living in the Carson City area of Nevada, where they had lived for more than 15 years, and where Tennille served as Ambassador for the Arts for the state. In the mid-2000s, they temporarily took year-round residence at their second home, located in the Palm Springs area of Southern California. In 2008, they sold their home near Carson City, and built a house in Prescott, Arizona, where Tennille participates in the annual Prescott Jazz Summit.

Tennille filed for divorce from Dragon in the State of Arizona on January 16, 2014, after 39 years of marriage. Dragon was unaware of the termination of his marriage until he was served with the divorce papers. The divorce documents referenced health insurance or health issues, and Tennille had written in her blog in 2010 that Dragon's neurological condition, known as essential tremor, was characterized by such extreme tremors that he could no longer play keyboards. Dragon later stated that some of his health problems were the result of errors in dosing his medication.

In 2016, Toni Tennille, Tennille's memoir (co-written with niece Caroline Tennille St. Clair), was published. In it, Tennille painted an unflattering picture of Dragon and their years together, writing that he was controlling and emotionally distant. "I can say without exaggeration that he showed no physical affection for me during our very long marriage," she wrote, claiming that the couple always slept in separate bedrooms.

After the idea of yacht rock arose in 2005, Captain & Tennille's music has been retrospectively grouped with that soft rock style.

Dragon and Tennille remained close friends until his death from complications of kidney failure on January 2, 2019, in Prescott, Arizona. Tennille was at his side when he died.

== Discography ==
=== Studio albums ===
Title	Album details	Peak chart positions					Certifications
Title	Album details	US	AUS	CAN	JPN	UK	Certifications
Love Will Keep Us Together	Released: May 23, 1975; Label: A&M Records; Formats: LP, 8-track, cassette	2	63	8	—	—	US: Gold; CAN: Platinum
Song of Joy	Released: February 27, 1976; Label: A&M Records; Formats: LP, 8-track, cassette	9	20	8	—	—	US: Platinum; CAN: Platinum
Come In from the Rain	Released: April 1977; Label: A&M Records; Formats: LP, 8-track, cassette	18	93	21	86	—	US: Gold; CAN: Gold
Dream	Released: May 1978; Label: A&M Records; Formats: LP, 8-track, cassette	131	97	—	—	—	
Make Your Move	Released: October 1979; Label: Casablanca Records; Formats: LP, 8-track, cassette	23	33	31	—	33	US: Gold
Keeping Our Love Warm	Released: 1980; Label: Casablanca Records; Formats: LP, 8-track, cassette	—	—	—	—	—	
More Than Dancing	Released: 1982; Label: Wizard Records; Formats: LP, cassette, CD	—	—	—	—	—	
The Secret of Christmas	Released: November 6, 2007; Label: Retroactive Entertainment; Formats: CD	—	—	—	—	—	

=== Compilation albums ===
Title	Album details	Peak chart positions		Certifications
Title	Album details	US	CAN	Certifications
Greatest Hits	Released: 1977; Label: A&M Records; Formats: LP, 8-Track, cassette	55	47	US: Gold
20 Greatest Hits	Released: 1980; Label: Music For Pleasure; Formats: LP, cassette	—	—	
The Captain & Tennille	Released: 1984; Label: Scoop 33; Formats: LP, cassette	—	—	
A&M Gold Series: Captain & Tennille	Released: 1986; Label: A&M Records; Formats: LP, CD	—	—	
Captain & Tennille	Released: 1991; Label: A&M Records, StarTrax; Formats: CD	—	—	
Scrapbook	Released: 1993; Label: Spectrum Music; Formats: CD	—	—	
Twenty Years of Romance	Released: 1995; Label: Nouveau; Formats: CD, cassette	—	—	
Captain & Tennille	Released: 1995; Label: Rem!nd; Formats: CD	—	—	
A&M Digitally Remastered Best	Released: 1998; Label: A&M Records; Formats: CD	—	—	
Ultimate Collection The Complete Hits	Released: 2001; Label: Hip-O Records; Formats: CD	—	—	
20th Century Masters – The Millennium Collection: The Best of Captain & Tennille	Released: 2005; Label: Universal Music; Formats: CD	—	—	
Songs of Joy: The Complete Captain & Tennille Collection	Released: 2005; Label: R2 Entertainment; Formats: CD	—	—	
Icon	Released: 2013; Label: Universal Music Enterprises; Formats: CD	—	—	

=== Singles ===
Title	Year	Peak chart positions							Certifications	Album
Title	Year	US	US AC	AUS	CAN	CAN AC	NZ	UK	Certifications	Album
"Love Will Keep Us Together"	1975	1	1	1	1	1	8	32	RIAA: Gold	Love Will Keep Us Together
"Por Amor Viviremos"	1975	49	—	—	59	—	—	—		Por Amor Viviremos
"The Way I Want to Touch You"	1975	4	1	9	2	1	21	28	RIAA: Gold	Love Will Keep Us Together
"Lonely Night (Angel Face)"	1976	3	1	9	1	1	10	—	RIAA: Gold	Song of Joy
"Shop Around"	1976	4	1	37	4	1	32	—	RIAA: Gold	Song of Joy
"Muskrat Love"	1976	4	1	65	1	3	—	—	RIAA: Gold	Song of Joy
"Can't Stop Dancin'"	1977	13	12	67	11	10	—	—		Come In from the Rain
"Come In from the Rain"	1977	61	8	—	45	6	—	—		Come In from the Rain
"Circles"	1977	—	9	—	—	17	—	—		Come In from the Rain
"I'm on My Way"	1978	74	6	—	85	13	—	—		Dream
"You Never Done It Like That"	1978	10	14	51	17	38	26	63		Dream
"You Need a Woman Tonight"	1978	40	17	—	38	9	—	—		Dream
"Do That to Me One More Time"	1979	1	4	3	4	1	5	7	RIAA: Gold	Make Your Move
"Love on a Shoestring"	1979	55	—	—	—	—	—	—		Make Your Move
"Happy Together (A Fantasy)"	1979	53	27	—	—	23	—	—		Make Your Move
"This Is Not the First Time"	1980	106	—	—	—	—	—	—		Keeping Our Love Warm
"Keeping Our Love Warm"	1980	—	—	—	—	—	—	—		Keeping Our Love Warm
"I Want a Hippopotamus for Christmas"	2007	—	—	—	—	—	—	—		The Secret of Christmas
"It's the Most Wonderful Time of the Year"	2007	—	—	—	—	—	—	—		The Secret of Christmas

=== DVDs ===
- The Ultimate Collection (2005)
- The Christmas Show (2007)
- Captain & Tennille in New Orleans (2007)
- Captain & Tennille in Hawaii (2007)
- Songbook (2007)

== See also ==
- 1976–77 United States network television schedule
- Captain & Tennille singles discography
