= Greatest Songs and More (Great Box) =

Box set by 10cc
- Released: 1991
- Recorded: 1972–1983
- Genre: Rock
- Label: Nippon Phonogram
- Producer: 10cc

The Greatest Songs and More (Great Box) is a 4-CD box set by 10cc released in Japan in June 1991. The compilation includes singles, album tracks, and rare b-sides recorded between 1972 and 1983. Many of the tracks included were unavailable on CD elsewhere until re-issues of their later albums were released—also in Japan—in 2006. It is not known how many copies were produced, but over the years it has commanded high prices on the collectors market.

== Track listing ==
Disc one

1. "Donna" (Kevin Godley/Lol Creme) – 2:56++ 1972
2. "Rubber Bullets" (Godley/Creme/Graham Gouldman) – 4:41++ 1973
3. "The Dean and I" (Godley/Creme) – 2:52++ 1973
4. "The Wall Street Shuffle" (Eric Stewart/Gouldman) – 3:51 1974
5. "Silly Love" (Creme/Stewart) – 3:14 1974
6. "Life is a Minestrone" (Creme/Stewart) – 4:41 1975
7. "Channel Swimmer" (Godley/Gouldman) – 4:48+ 1975
8. "I'm Not in Love" (Stewart/Gouldman) – 6:02 1975
9. "Good News" (Godley/Creme) – 3:45+ 1975
10. "The Second Sitting for the Last Supper" (Godley/Creme/Stewart/Gouldman) – 4:22 1975
11. "Blackmail" (Stewart/Gouldman) – 4:26 1975
12. "Une Nuit A Paris" (Godley/Creme) – 8:38 1975
13. "The Film of My Love" (Godley/Creme) – 5:01 1975

Disc two

1. "Art for Art's Sake" (Stewart/Gouldman) – 5:59 1975
2. "Get It While You Can" (Stewart/Gouldman) – 2:54+ 1975
3. "I'm Mandy Fly Me" (Stewart/Gouldman/Godley) – 5:20 1976
4. "I Wanna Rule the World" (Godley/Creme/Gouldman) – 3:56 1976
5. "Rock and Roll Lullaby" (Stewart/Gouldman) – 3:58 1976
6. "Don't Hang Up" (Godley/Creme) – 6:18 1976
7. "The Things We Do for Love" (Stewart/Gouldman) – 3:28 1976
8. "Hot to Trot" (Stewart/Gouldman) – 4:26+ 1976
9. "Good Morning Judge" (Stewart/Gouldman) – 2:53 1977
10. "Don't Squeeze me like Toothpaste" (Stewart/Gouldman) – 3:41+ 1977
11. "People in Love" (Stewart/Gouldman) – 3:44 1977
12. "I'm So Laid Back, I'm Laid Out" (Stewart/Gouldman) – 3:45+ 1977
13. "Marriage Bureau Rendezvous" (Stewart/Gouldman) – 4:03 1977
14. "Honeymoon with B Troop" (Stewart/Gouldman) – 2:45 1977
15. "I Bought a Flat Guitar Tutor" (Stewart/Gouldman) – 1:45 1977

Disc three

1. "The Things We Do for Love - Live" (Stewart/Gouldman) – 3:44 1977
2. "Ships Don't Disappear in the Night (Do They?) - Live” (Stewart/Gouldman) – 7:36 1977
3. "I'm Mandy Fly Me - Live" (Stewart/Gouldman/Godley) – 5:26 1977
4. "Waterfall - Live" (Stewart/Gouldman) – 7:25 1977
5. "Dreadlock Holiday" (Stewart/Gouldman) – 4:29 1978
6. "Nothing Can Move Me" (Stewart/Gouldman) – 4:03+ 1978
7. "Reds in My Bed" (Stewart/Tosh) – 4:08 1978
8. "Take These Chains" (Stewart/Gouldman) – 2:36 1978
9. "For You and I" (Stewart/Gouldman) – 5:18 1978
10. "From Rochdale to Ocho Rios" (Gouldman) – 3:42 1978
11. "One-Two-Five" (Stewart/Gouldman) – 5:10 1980
12. "Only Child" (Stewart/Gouldman) – 3:14+ 1980
13. "It Doesn't Matter at All" (Stewart/Gouldman) – 4.00 1980
14. "I Hate to Eat Alone" (Gouldman) – 2:54 1980

Disc four

1. "Les Nouveau Riches" (Stewart) – 5:09 1981
2. "Don't Turn Me Away" (Stewart) – 5:00 1981
3. "Tomorrows World Today" (Gouldman) – 3:13+ 1981
4. "Memories" (Stewart/Gouldman) – 4:26 1981
5. "The Power of Love" (Stewart/Gouldman/Gold) – 4:13 1982
6. "You're Coming Home Again" (Stewart) – 4:27+ 1982
7. "Run Away" (Stewart/Gouldman/Gold) – 4:02 1982
8. "Action Man in Motown Suit" (Stewart/Gouldman) – 4:45 1981
9. "We've Heard It All Before" (Stewart/Gouldman/Gold) – 3:35 1982
10. "Overdraft in Overdrive" (Stewart/Gouldman) – 3:22 1981
11. "24 Hours" (Stewart/Gouldman) – 7:26 1983
12. "Feel the Love (Oomachasaooma)" (Stewart/Gouldman) – 5:09 1983
13. "She Gives Me Pain" (Stewart/Gouldman) – 2:15+ 1983
14. ”I'm Not in Love - Live" (Stewart/Gouldman) – 6:05 1977

All the tracks are album versions except: ++ Single Edit + B-Side

== Notes ==
The box set left several other "officially released" tracks/versions that hadn't been issued on CD:

1. "One Two Five" (Single Version)+
2. "Les Nouveau Riches" (Single Version)++
3. "Memories" (US Version)++
4. "I'm Not in Love - Live" (b-side of "24 Hours")+++
5. "Dreadlock Holiday - Live" (b-side of "24 Hours")+++
6. "24 Hours" (Single Edit)+++
7. "Feel the Love" (Single Edit)+++
8. "The Secret Life of Henry" (b-side of Dutch single "Food for Thought")+++
9. "Food for Thought" (Single Edit)+++

These have since been released on: + Look Hear? (2006 Japan Re-issue) ++ Ten Out of 10 (2006 Japan Re-issue) +++ Windows in the Jungle (2006 Japan Re-issue)
