= Windows in the Jungle =

Studio album by 10cc
- Released: September 1983
- Recorded: October 1982 – May 1983
- Studios: Strawberry Studios (Stockport, England)
- Genres: Art rock; progressive rock
- Length: 42:20
- Label: Mercury
- Producers: Eric Stewart; Graham Gouldman

10cc chronology
Ten Out of 10 (1981)	Windows in the Jungle (1983)	Changing Faces – The Very Best of 10cc and Godley & Creme (1987)

Singles from Windows in the Jungle
- 1. "24 Hours" Released: March 1983; 2. "Feel the Love (Oomachasaooma)" Released: July 1983; 3. "Food for Thought" Released: 1983 (Netherlands)

Windows in the Jungle is a 1983 album by the English rock band 10cc, their ninth studio album since their debut, 10cc, in 1973. It was intended to be a concept album with a theme of love and life in the city, though band member and co-writer Eric Stewart felt they didn't achieve their goal because they felt pressured to write a hit single. The album was not a commercial or critical success, and the contract with Mercury Records ended, and the band wouldn't release another album for nine years.

== Production ==
The songs on the album were written together by Eric Stewart and Graham Gouldman, some of which were extended pieces with complex arrangements ("24 Hours", "Taxi! Taxi!", "The Secret Life of Henry"), reminiscent of the "Une Nuit a Paris" and "Feel the Benefit" from earlier albums. Liam Newton, author of the band's biography, The Worst Band in the World, says the album was intended to have a unifying concept of love and life in the city.

As with the previous 10cc album, Ten Out of 10, the band consisted of Eric Stewart and Graham Gouldman with other musicians including long-time 10cc collaborators Rick Fenn and Stuart Tosh along with recent addition of Vic Emerson to the live lineup. However, the album marked the absence of Paul Burgess for the first time since 1977 Deceptive Bends.

Windows in the Jungle was recorded in Strawberry Studios North, the first time 10cc recorded the album entirely there since 1976 How Dare You! as Strawberry Studios South was occupied at the beginning of the recording by The Moody Blues for the recording of The Present.

== Release and promotion ==
The album made only a brief appearance in the UK charts peaking at No. 70, but became a Top 10 in Netherlands peaking at No. 7.

Two singles were released from the album, UK only "24 Hours" in early 1983 featuring live versions of "I'm Not in Love" and "Dreadlock Holiday" from the 10th Anniversary tour in 1982, and "Feel the Love (Oomachasaooma)", which was given a tennis-themed music video by former 10cc members Godley and Creme. Both made low appearance in the UK charts at No. 78 and No. 87 respectively, but "Feel the Love" became a Top 10 hit in Netherlands again, also peaking at No. 7. A third single, released only in the Netherlands, was "Food for Thought" coupled with the non-album track "The Secret Life of Henry". It charted at No. 18.

The album was reissued in 2006 in Japan and in 2014 in Europe featuring single edits and b-sides as bonus tracks.

== Reception ==
Professional ratings
Review scores
Source	Rating
AllMusic	2.5/5 stars

Eric Stewart recalled that the finished album did not meet his initial expectations:

"Windows started as a concept album and I'm sorry I didn't pursue that goal, the pressure for the hit single always got in the way with 10cc albums.

I longed to be like Pink Floyd and just go for large musical statements like "One Night in Paris" and "Feel the Benefit", but we were locked onto the singles roundabout, the 'quick buck', and it was impossible to break free at the time. The album was not really very successful, 10cc wise, anywhere in the rest of the world really, but in terms of sales today it was a minor hit."

Cover for Single "Food for Thought"

The album turned out to be the last for 10cc for nine years, as well as their final album for Mercury Records and final to be recorded in their own Strawberry Studios. It was also the final studio album to feature musicians from the lineup formed during the making of Bloody Tourists (1978) (except for the brief appearance of Rick Fenn on Mirror Mirror).

== Track listing ==
All songs written by Eric Stewart and Graham Gouldman.

1. "24 Hours" – 8:09
2. "Feel the Love (Oomachasaooma)" – 5:10
3. "Yes, I Am" – 6:03
4. "Americana Panorama" – 3:45
5. "City Lights" – 3:34
6. "Food for Thought" – 3:34
7. "Working Girls" – 4:26
8. "Taxi! Taxi!" – 7:39

Reissue bonus tracks
No.	Title	Length
9.	"24 Hours (Radio Edit)"	4:23
10.	"Dreadlock Holiday (Live, London / 1982)"	4:58
11.	"I'm Not in Love (Live, London / 1982)"	6:35
12.	"Feel the Love (Oomachasaooma) (Radio Edit)"	3:46
13.	"She Gives Me Pain" (Instrumental)	2:14
14.	"Food for Thought (Radio Edit)"	3:21
15.	"The Secret Life of Henry"	6:05

== Personnel ==
10cc

- Eric Stewart – lead vocals, keyboards, lead guitars, percussion
- Graham Gouldman – vocals, acoustic guitar, rhythm guitars, bass, guitar, percussion
- Rick Fenn – vocals, lead guitar, acoustic guitar
- Vic Emerson – keyboards
- Stuart Tosh – vocals, percussion, marimba, drums (on "Food for Thought")

with

- Mike Timony – keyboards
- Steve Gadd – drums, percussion
- Simon Phillips – drums
- Mel Collins – saxophones

Production

- Eric Stewart – producer, engineer
- Graham Gouldman – producer
- Martin Lawrence – engineer, mixing
- Chris "CJ" Jones – assistant engineer
- Ian Cooper – mastering at The Townhouse (London, UK)
- STd (Storm Thorgerson) – sleeve design

== Charts performance ==
=== Weekly charts ===
Chart (1983)	Peak position
Canada Top Albums/CDs (RPM)	97
Dutch Albums (Album Top 100)	7
UK Albums (Official Charts)	70

=== Year-end charts ===
Chart (1983)	Rank
Dutch Albums (MegaCharts)	63
