= Live and Let Live (10cc album) =

Live album by 10cc
- Released: October 1977
- Recorded: 18–20 June 1977; 16–17 July 1977
- Venues: Hammersmith Odeon, London; Manchester Apollo, Manchester
- Genres: Progressive pop; pop rock; art rock
- Length: 90:15
- Label: Mercury
- Producers: Eric Stewart, Graham Gouldman

10cc chronology
| Deceptive Bends (1977) | Live and Let Live (1977) | Bloody Tourists (1978) |

Singles from Live and Let Live
- 1. "The Wall Street Shuffle" Released: 1977; 2. "I'm Mandy Fly Me" Released: 1978

Professional ratings
Review scores
| Source | Rating |
|---|---|
| AllMusic | 3.5/5 stars |

Live and Let Live is 10cc's first live album, released in the autumn of 1977. It was recorded at the Hammersmith Odeon in London between 18 and 20 June 1977 and the Manchester Apollo, Manchester between 16 and 17 July 1977.

== Overview ==
The album features the then-new line-up of 10cc after the departure of Kevin Godley and Lol Creme in 1976. The trio of Eric Stewart, Graham Gouldman and Paul Burgess who recorded the most recent 10cc album, Deceptive Bends, that was issued earlier that year, were joined by Rick Fenn, Stuart Tosh and Tony O'Malley. Tony O'Malley was also assigned with lead vocals on "Art for Art's Sake".

As the tour promoted Deceptive Bends, the live album features all but one track from it – "I Bought a Flat Guitar Tutor". The set list relied mostly on Stewart/Gouldman compositions.

== Release and reception ==
The album was a hit, reaching Top 10 in Norway and Sweden and No. 14 in the UK charts and later receiving a Gold certification. The song "The Wall Street Shuffle" backed with "You've Got a Cold" was issued as a single in America, but failed to reach the charts. "I'm Mandy Fly Me" was issued as a single in Australia.

== Track listing ==
All tracks composed by Eric Stewart and Graham Gouldman, except where indicated.

Side one

1. "The Second Sitting for the Last Supper" (Stewart, Gouldman, Kevin Godley, Lol Creme) - 5:22
2. "You've Got a Cold" - 3:57
3. "Honeymoon with B Troop" - 3:56
4. "Art for Art's Sake" - 7:14
5. "People in Love" - 4:11

Side two

1. "The Wall Street Shuffle" - 4:12
2. "Ships Don't Disappear in the Night (Do They?)" - 7:33
3. "I'm Mandy Fly Me" (Stewart, Gouldman, Godley) - 6:03
4. "Marriage Bureau Rendezvous" - 4:20

Side three

1. "Good Morning Judge" - 3:11
2. "Feel the Benefit" - 13:35
3. "The Things We Do for Love" - 3:49

Side four

1. "Waterfall" - 7:48
2. "I'm Not in Love" - 6:59
3. "Modern Man Blues" - 8:05

== Personnel ==
- Eric Stewart – lead vocals, guitar, grand piano, electric piano
- Graham Gouldman – lead vocals, bass guitar, guitar
- Tony O'Malley – backing and lead vocals, grand piano, organ, clavioline, Minimoog and Polymoog synthesizers
- Rick Fenn – backing vocals, guitar, bass guitar
- Paul Burgess – drums, percussion, electric piano
- Stuart Tosh – backing vocals, drums, percussion

== Charts ==
| Chart (1977/78) | Peak position |
|---|---|
| Australia (Kent Music Report) | 13 |
| United Kingdom (Official Charts Company) | 14 |
| United States (Billboard 200) | 146 |
