= How Dare You =

How Dare You may refer to:

- How Dare You! (TV series), a UK children's TV series from 1984 to 1987
- How Dare You (speech), by Greta Thunberg at the 2019 UN Climate Action Summit

== Music ==
- How Dare You! (album), by 10cc
- How Dare You? (Electric Six album), 2017
- "How Dare You!", a song by 10cc, a B-side of "I'm Mandy Fly Me"
- "How Dare You", So Cool (Sistar album)
- "How Dare You", a song by Whodini from Back in Black
- "How Dare You", a song by Lupe Fiasco from Food & Liquor II: The Great American Rap Album Pt. 1
