= Feel the Benefit =

Song by 10cc

from the album Deceptive Bends
- Released: May 1977
- Recorded: Strawberry Studios South
- Genre: Progressive pop, art rock
- Length: 11:32
- Label: Mercury
- Songwriters: Eric Stewart, Graham Gouldman
- Producer: 10cc

"Feel the Benefit" is a song by 10cc appearing on their 1977 album, Deceptive Bends. It is the final track on the album, and is the band's longest studio recording at eleven and a half minutes. The song is a fan favourite, and has been included on many of the band's compilation albums and has been performed live by the band many times since its release.

The song showcases a heavy Beatles-influenced sound. Some of its musical elements seem to be directly inspired by the songs "Dear Prudence" (1968) and "Venus and Mars" (1975).

== Composition ==
The song is a suite in three parts:

- I: "Reminisce and Speculate"

The first part of the song starts with a slow chord progression played on guitar in a similar fashion to "Dear Prudence". Eventually, loud orchestral crashes signaling the start of the song are added as well. Following a short orchestral melody, the song's verses are then sung by Eric Stewart. The bridge is sung by both Stewart and Graham Gouldman. This part ends with an orchestral passage which leads into a guitar solo. After this guitar solo ends, a bass riff is played that leads directly into the song's second part.

- II: "A Latin Break"

As its name implies, this part of the song incorporates elements of reggae and Latin music, which would also heavily influence the band's next album. It is also more fast-paced and pop-oriented compared to the rest of the song. This part is primarily sung by Gouldman. This part of the song ends with a guitar riff that slowly fades out.

- III: "Feel the Benefit"

The final part of the song reprises many elements from the first part. While the guitar riff from the previous part is fading out, the same chord progression that started the song starts to fade in, and then this part continues very much in the same fashion as the first part did. Following the final verse is a two-minute guitar solo that abruptly stops, ending the song.

== Personnel ==
- Eric Stewart – lead and backing vocals, lead guitar, piano, electric piano, Moog synthesizer, maracas
- Graham Gouldman – lead and backing vocals, electric guitar, acoustic guitar, bass guitar, harp
- Paul Burgess – drums, percussion
- Del Newman – string arrangements
