= Feel the Love (Oomachasaooma) =

Single by 10cc

from the album Windows in the Jungle
- B-side: "She Gives Me Pain"
- Released: July 1983
- Genre: Progressive pop; sophisti-pop; art rock; pop rock; soft rock
- Length: 5:10
- Label: Mercury
- Songwriter(s): Eric Stewart; Graham Gouldman
- Producer(s): 10cc

10cc singles chronology
"24 Hours" (1983)	"Feel the Love (Oomachasaooma)" (1983)	"Food for Thought" (1983)

"Feel the Love (Oomachasaooma)" is a song by 10cc released as a second single from the album Windows in the Jungle in 1983. On several releases and editions the song is labeled as "Oomachasaooma (Feel the Love)".

== Release and promotion ==
As the band's previous single, "24 Hours", was released only in UK, "Feel the Love (Oomachasaooma)" became the lead single in other territories. The song was promoted by a music video directed by Godley & Creme thus making the first partial reunion of the original band members since the split in 1976.

The single peaked at #87 band's native UK charts, but fared much better in Europe, becoming one of 10cc's best selling singles in the Netherlands.

== Personnel ==
- Eric Stewart – lead vocals, electric guitar, keyboards, percussion
- Graham Gouldman – vocals, bass guitar, rhythm guitar, percussion
- Steve Gadd – drums, percussion
- Rick Fenn – vocals, lead guitar
- Stuart Tosh – vocals
- Vic Emerson – organ

== Chart performance ==
=== Weekly charts ===
Chart (1983)	Peak position
Australia (Kent Music Report)	76
Belgium (Ultratop 50 Flanders)	13
Netherlands (Dutch Top 40)	7
Netherlands (Single Top 100)	7
UK Singles (OCC)	87

=== Year-end charts ===
Chart (1983)	Position
Netherlands (Dutch Top 40)	39
Netherlands (Single Top 100)	51
