= Ten Out of 10 =

Studio album by 10cc
- Released: 27 November 1981; June 1982 (US version)
- Recorded: November 1980 – July 1981 (UK Version)
- Studios: Strawberry Studios South, Dorking, Surrey; Strawberry Studios North, Stockport
- Genres: Progressive rock; art rock; pop rock; art pop
- Length: 44:32 (UK release)
- Label: Warner Bros./Mercury Records
- Producers: Eric Stewart, Graham Gouldman

10cc chronology
Look Hear? (1980)	Ten Out of 10 (1981)	Windows in the Jungle (1983)

Singles from Ten Out of 10
- 1. "Les Nouveaux Riches" Released: May 1981; 2. "Don't Turn Me Away" Released: November 1981; 3. "The Power of Love" Released: March 1982; 4. "Run Away" Released: July 1982; 5. "We've Heard It All Before" Released: October 1982

Ten Out of 10 is the eighth studio album by 10cc. It was released in two different versions, with the original edition coming in November 1981 and the US version coming in June 1982 respectively.

== Overview ==
After two albums from 10cc as a six-piece lineup, Ten Out of 10 was a return to the core duo of Graham Gouldman and Eric Stewart. All other contributors were session musicians; these included two who had played on the band's previous album, 1980s Look Hear?: drummer Paul Burgess, who played on all but three tracks, and guitarist and singer Rick Fenn, who was credited on two tracks but who actually played on all other tracks, though uncredited. Another session musician was pianist Vic Emerson of Sad Café, who also joined the band on tour. The album credits identified Gouldman and Stewart as "Graham" and "Eric", as on previous albums, with other musicians credited with their full names. The only band member photos on the album were those of Gouldman and Stewart.

The album marked the first involvement with 10cc by American singer-songwriter Andrew Gold. Gouldman said the band's label in the US, Warner Bros. Records, wanted more of an American flavour to the album:

They were keen for us to work with an American producer or writer. Well, we hadn't had any big success since '78, and we wanted to get hot again. When they suggested Andrew Gold, I was over the moon. I'd always adored his work, and I reckoned he would be a kindred spirit ... I felt really we needed some new blood, but it didn't work out. Andrew was doing so much stuff in America that it just wasn't practical, although he really wanted to do it."

Gold was invited to record with the band by Lenny Waronker, head of A&R at Warners. Gold explained:

He was of the opinion that, although the album was very strong, it might benefit the US audience to have a few additional cuts tailored more for the American ear. As he knew I was an Anglophile, we might hit it off well. Soon I was in the UK, co-writing and co-producing three tracks for the album, which was a blast to do and turned out very well.

Andrew Gold was also invited to join the band but declined because of other commitments:

During the course of my three-week stay, Eric, Graham and I fell in love, as it were, and soon they asked me to join the band, which was an extremely exciting offer. For various reasons, which now seem dumb to me, and after great consideration, I demurred in favour of pursuing my own career and returned to America.

Recording was split between the band's two studios, Strawberry Studios South at Dorking, Surrey, and Strawberry Studios North at Stockport, Greater Manchester. The recording of the album was interrupted by Eric Stewart's contributions to Paul McCartney's Tug of War and Graham Gouldman's production of The Ramones' Pleasant Dreams in the first half of 1981.

Unlike the band's previous cover designs which were done by Hipgnosis, the cover for Ten Out of 10 was designed by Visible Ink Ltd, which also created the cover for ABC's The Lexicon of Love (1982). To create the image, model-making techniques similar to those used in cinema were used - the façade of the building is actually a miniature placed in front of the camera, with the people posed behind it.

== Release and reception ==
Professional ratings
Review scores
Source	Rating
AllMusic	4/5 stars

The album was released in two variations: the original edition in 1981 for all markets except the US and, in 1982, a rather different version, exclusively for the US. The US edition of the album included three new compositions co-written by Andrew Gold: "The Power of Love", "We've Heard It All Before", and "Run Away", along with "Tomorrow's World Today", which was originally a b-side to the "Don't Turn Me Away" single, and a different mix of "Memories". The new songs replaced "Action Man in Motown Suit", "Listen with Your Eyes", "Lying Here with You" and "Survivor".

The album was preceded by the singles "Les Nouveaux Riches" b/w "I Hate to Eat Alone" (UK only release) and "Don't Turn Me Away" b/w "Tomorrow's World Today" (except US). "Memories" b/w "Overdraft in Overdrive" was later released in The Netherlands and Australia only. It was also scheduled for UK-release in February 1982 but a month later "The Power of Love" was released instead. New compositions recorded with Andrew Gold were all released as singles in 1982: "The Power of Love" b/w "You're Coming Home Again" (released with "Action Man in a Motown Suit" as the B-side in some countries), "Run Away" b/w "Action Man in a Motown Suit", "We've Heard It All Before" b/w "Overdraft in Overdrive" (UK only release).

Ten Out of 10 failed to chart in the UK and despite the revisions to the album made for the North American market, it did not chart in the US either. Like the previous 10cc album Look Hear?, Ten Out of 10 performed better in Europe and Canada. The single "Don't Turn Me Away" was a Top 40 hit in Canada, reaching #38, while "Run Away" managed to peak at #50 in the UK, the band's first charting single since "Dreadlock Holiday" in 1978.

Gouldman later admitted that greater involvement by Gold might have lifted the band's early 1980s output from its mediocrity:

We should either have tried to change direction, which we didn't, or got someone else in the band, which we almost did. The albums weren't really bad, there was always the integrity, and the production values, but in retrospect, I find them rather dour, rather lacklustre. That's why I thought we should have got someone else in, to kick us up the arse. We didn't see what was going on around us, maybe we should have got a producer at that point."

Following Ten Out of 10, the band ended the stint with Warner Bros. Records in the US which had started with their previous album Look Hear? (1980).

The album was reissued on CD in Japan in 2006 with the original UK tracklisting, adding the US version tracks, b-sides and single versions as bonus tracks. It was reissued in the SHM-CD format in 2008 (again a Japanese exclusive release) in 2008. Both the 2006 and 2008 reissues were packaged in mini-LP replica artwork.

On 25 August 2014, the album finally received a UK release. It features the same track listing as the 2006 deluxe edition; however, it is packaged in a jewel box with a booklet. The 2014 version was mastered by Andy Pearce. The album received a U.S. release on CD the following week on 2 September 2014.

== Track listings ==
=== UK version ===
Mercury – 6359 048

Side one
No.	Title	Writer(s)	Lead vocals	Length
1.	"Don't Ask"	Graham Gouldman	Gouldman	4:02
2.	"Overdraft in Overdrive"	Eric Stewart, Gouldman	Gouldman	3:24
3.	"Don't Turn Me Away"	Stewart	Stewart	5:03
4.	"Memories"	Stewart, Gouldman	Stewart	4:31
5.	"Notell Hotel"	Stewart, Gouldman	Stewart	4:56

Side two
No.	Title	Writer(s)	Lead vocals	Length
6.	"Les Nouveaux Riches"	Stewart	Stewart	5:11
7.	"Action Man in Motown Suit"	Stewart, Gouldman	Gouldman and Stewart	4:45
8.	"Listen with Your Eyes"	Stewart, Gouldman	Stewart	3:10
9.	"Lying Here with You"	Gouldman	Stewart	3:22
10.	"Survivor"	Gouldman, Stewart	Gouldman	5:46

=== US version ===
Warner Bros. Records – BSK 3575

Side one
No.	Title	Writer(s)	Lead vocals	Length
1.	"Don't Ask"	Gouldman	Gouldman	4:01
2.	"The Power of Love"	Stewart, Gouldman, Andrew Gold	Stewart and Gouldman	4:14
3.	"Les Nouveaux Riches"	Stewart	Stewart	5:12
4.	"Memories" (US Mix)	Stewart, Gouldman	Stewart	4:27
5.	"We've Heard It All Before"	Stewart, Gouldman, Gold	Gouldman and Stewart	3:48

Side two
No.	Title	Writer(s)	Lead vocals	Length
6.	"Don't Turn Me Away"	Stewart	Stewart	5:03
7.	"Notell Hotel"	Stewart, Gouldman	Stewart	4:56
8.	"Overdraft in Overdrive"	Stewart, Gouldman	Gouldman	3:22
9.	"Tomorrow's World Today"	Gouldman	Gouldman	3:14
10.	"Run Away"	Stewart, Gouldman, Gold	Stewart	4:07

=== Bonus tracks on the 2006 CD reissue ===
No.	Title	Writer(s)	Lead vocals	Length
11.	"The Power of Love"	Stewart, Gouldman, Gold	Stewart and Gouldman	4:11
12.	"Memories (U.S. mix)"	Stewart, Gouldman	Stewart	4:28
13.	"We've Heard It All Before"	Stewart, Gouldman, Gold	Gouldman and Stewart	3:37
14.	"Tomorrow's World Today"	Gouldman	Gouldman	3:10
15.	"Run Away"	Stewart, Gouldman, Gold	Stewart	4:02
16.	"Les Nouveaux Riches (Single Mix)"	Stewart	Stewart	4:47
17.	"You're Coming Home Again"	Stewart	Stewart	4:29

== Personnel ==
10cc

- Eric Stewart – lead vocals, synthesiser, guitars, bass, slide guitar, pianos, percussion, synthesiser strings, rock snare
- Graham Gouldman – lead vocals, bass, guitars, percussion, double bass, sitar
- Rick Fenn – guitars, fretless bass, backing vocals ("Don't Ask" and "Action Man in Motown Suit" only), backing vocals on all other tracks-uncredited, guitars on various tracks uncredited
- Vic Emerson – Synclavier, string synthesiser, piano, electric piano ("Don't Ask", "Lying Here with You", "Survivor" and "Tomorrow's World Today" only)
- Paul Burgess – drums, percussion (except "Lying Here with You", "Survivor" and "Run Away")

with

- Marc Jordan – organ, piano, backing vocals, electric piano ("Don't Ask" and "Action Man in Motown Suit" only)
- Lenni Crookes – sax on "Don't Turn Me Away"
- Simon Phillips – drums on "Survivor" and "Tomorrow's World Today"
- Keith Bessey – maracas on "Survivor"
- Andrew Gold – vocals, bass, guitar, piano, electric piano, synthesiser, vocoder, percussion ("The Power of Love", "We've Heard It All Before" and "Run Away" only)

== Charts ==
Chart (1981)	Peak position
Dutch Albums (Album Top 100)	49
Norwegian Albums (VG-lista)	17
Swedish Albums (Sverigetopplistan)	24

Chart (1982)	Peak position
Australia (Kent Music Report)	70
Canada Top Albums/CDs (RPM)	31
United States (Billboard 200)	209
