= Bloody Tourists =

Studio album by 10cc
- Released: September 1978
- Recorded: Strawberry Studios South (Dorking, Surrey, England)
- Length: 49:57
- Labels: Mercury; Polydor (North America)
- Producers: Eric Stewart; Graham Gouldman

10cc chronology
Live and Let Live (1977)	Bloody Tourists (1978)	Greatest Hits 1972–1978 (1979)

Singles from Bloody Tourists
- 1. "Dreadlock Holiday" Released: July 1978; 2. "Reds in My Bed" Released: November 1978 (UK); 3. "From Rochdale to Ocho Rios" Released: December 1978 (Aus); 4. "For You and I" Released: December 1978 (US)

Professional ratings
Review scores
Source	Rating
AllMusic	2/5 stars
Uncut	4/5 stars

Bloody Tourists is the sixth studio album by the English rock band 10cc, released worldwide by Mercury Records and in North America by Polydor Records in September 1978. Recorded at Strawberry Studios South in Dorking, the album was produced by Eric Stewart and Graham Gouldman.

== Overview ==
The album is the first 10cc studio album to feature the band as a six piece. The new lineup was already assembled for the tour in support of the band's previous album, Deceptive Bends, but changing Tony O'Malley for Duncan Mackay on the keyboards. The band was solidified with songwriting and lead vocals contributions from other members than the core duo of Stewart and Gouldman. It was also the first 10cc album to feature songs written separately by Stewart and Gouldman.

=== Cover art ===
The cover art was again created by Hipgnosis with graphics by George Hardie and shows a map being blown into someone's face. The map is showing the French island Martinique, located in the Lesser Antilles of the West Indies in the eastern Caribbean Sea. The cover photograph was taken by Aubrey Powell of Hipgnosis. The cover idea had been first presented to Genesis, who rejected it. The cover was also the first to feature the longtime 10cc logo with a star inside the zero.

== Release and reception ==
The first single, "Dreadlock Holiday", backed with non-album track "Nothing Can Move Me", preceded the album and topped the charts in several countries, including the United Kingdom, where it became the band's third and last number-one hit. Driven by the success of the lead single, the album reached number 3 in the UK Albums Chart.

The second single varied in different territories. While most of the countries received "Reds in My Bed", "For You and I" was issued in America where it was also featured on the soundtrack for the film Moment by Moment, while "From Rochdale to Ocho Rios" was released in Oceania. The B-side was "Take These Chains" for all territories.

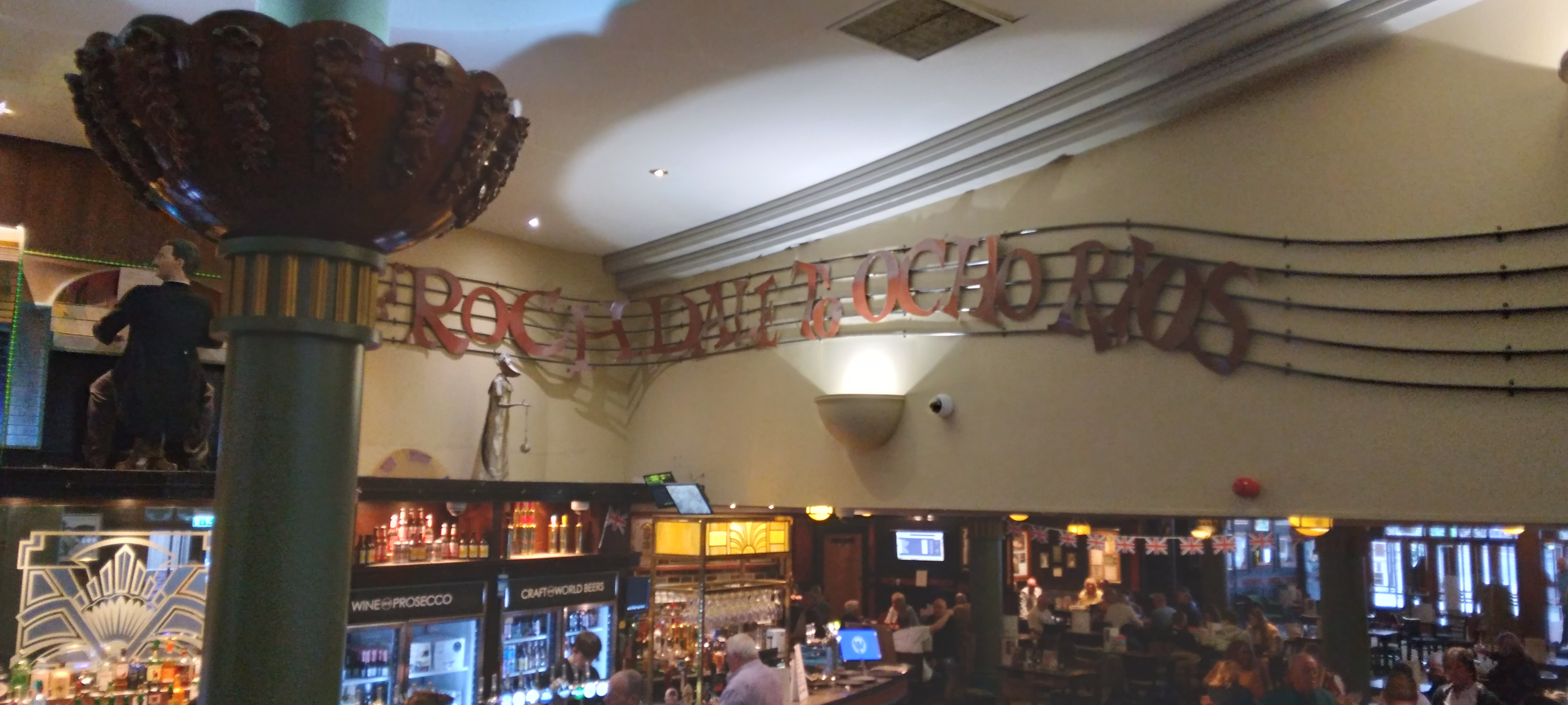
From Rochdale to Ocho Rios written on the wall of a pub in Rochdale, Greater Manchester

Record World said the single "For You and I" "is a typically lush production with picturesque lyrics and a pop perfect hook." The Globe and Mail noted that "this is not what you would call progressive music exactly, yet it's probably as advanced as pop gets, in or near the mainstream."

The album was reissued on CD in 1997 adding "Nothing Can Move Me", the B-side to "Dreadlock Holiday", as bonus track. In 2008, the Japanese reissue added additional versions of the album songs as bonus tracks.

== Track listing ==
Side one
No.	Title	Writer(s)	Lead vocals	Length
1.	"Dreadlock Holiday"	Eric Stewart, Graham Gouldman	Gouldman with Stewart	4:28
2.	"For You and I"	Stewart, Gouldman	Stewart	5:20
3.	"Take These Chains"	Stewart, Gouldman	Stewart	2:36
4.	"Shock on the Tube (Don't Want Love)"	Stewart	Stewart	3:38
5.	"Last Night"	Gouldman, Rick Fenn	Gouldman	3:10
6.	"The Anonymous Alcoholic"	Stewart, Gouldman	Stewart and Gouldman	5:38

Side two
No.	Title	Writer(s)	Lead vocals	Length
7.	"Reds in My Bed"	Stewart, Stuart Tosh	Tosh with Stewart	4:08
8.	"Lifeline"	Gouldman	Gouldman	3:26
9.	"Tokyo"	Stewart	Stewart	4:29
10.	"Old Mister Time"	Stewart, Duncan Mackay	Stewart	4:27
11.	"From Rochdale to Ocho Rios"	Gouldman	Gouldman	3:41
12.	"Everything You Wanted to Know About!!!"	Stewart	Stewart	4:25
Total length:				49:57

1997 Mercury Records remastered edition bonus track
No.	Title	Writer(s)	Lead vocal	Length
13.	"Nothing Can Move Me"	Stewart, Gouldman	Stewart	4:02
Total length:				54:58

2008 Japan SHM-CD bonus tracks
No.	Title	Writer(s)	Lead vocal	Length
13.	"Dreadlock Holiday" (long version)	Stewart, Gouldman	Gouldman with Stewart	5:01
14.	"Nothing Can Move Me"	Stewart, Gouldman	Stewart	4:04
15.	"For You and I" (DJ edit)	Stewart, Gouldman	Stewart	3:51
Total length:				62:46

== Personnel ==
Credits sourced from the original album liner notes.

=== 10cc ===
- Eric Stewart – lead (2–4, 6, 9, 10, 12), co-lead (1, 7) and backing vocals (all but 2), lead guitar (3, 4, 8, 11), electric guitar (3–6, 8, 10, 12), slide guitar (3, 6, 11), Fender Rhodes electric piano (1, 2, 7, 8), grand piano (3, 4, 7, 12), Polymoog (2) and Moog synthesizers (2, 7, 8), organ (1, 3), acoustic guitar (9), maracas (1, 5), cowbell (5), M/C (11)
- Graham Gouldman – lead (1, 5, 8, 11) and backing vocals (1–4, 6–9, 11), bass guitar (all tracks), fuzz bass (5), electric guitar (1, 2, 4–8, 12), acoustic guitar (2, 3, 7–9, 11), zither (9), wind chimes (9), whistle (11), cabasa (1), tambourine (10), percussion (11)
- Rick Fenn – backing vocals (1–4, 6–9, 11), electric guitar (1–7), lead guitar (8–10, 12), acoustic guitar (7, 9, 11), fretless bass guitar (9), saxophone (6, 10), "Dorking Horns" (6), electric saxophone (12), Polymoog (3) and Moog synthesizers (2, 6), organ (1, 8), tambourine (10), percussion (11)
- Paul Burgess – drums (2, 4, 6, 10–12), cowbells (1), congas (1, 6), marimba (1), triangle (1, 8, 12), agogô (1), timbales (1, 8), concert bass drums (2), glockenspiel (3, 7), tambourine (3, 7, 10), military snare drums (7), roto-toms (8, 10), vibraphone (8, 12), percussion (11), backing vocals (11)
- Stuart Tosh – lead (7) and backing vocals (1, 2, 4, 6–9, 11), "Shouted Encouragement!" (12), drums (1, 3, 5–9), tambourine (1, 7, 10), snare drum (4), cowbell (5), sleigh bells (5), congas (6), bongos (6), military snare drum (7), cabasa (7), percussion (11), trombone (6)
- Duncan Mackay – backing vocals (4, 11), grand piano (4–6, 9–11), Fender Rhodes electric piano (5, 10), Yamaha CS-80 (1, 4, 5, 9–12) and Moog synthesizers (9), Moog Taurus (9), violin (4, 9, 10), tambourine (10), Steel drum solo (11), percussion (11)

=== Additional personnel ===
- Kate Spath – cello (10)
- Tony Spath – backing vocal (11)

=== Technical personnel ===
- Keith Bessey – engineer
- Tony Spath – engineer
- Melvyn Abrahams – mastering
- Hipgnosis – cover design and photos
- George Hardie – graphics

== Charts ==
=== Weekly charts ===
Chart (1978–79)	Peak position
Australia (Kent Music Report)	3
Canada Top Albums/CDs (RPM)	75
Dutch Albums (Album Top 100)	2
German Albums (Offizielle Top 100)	12
New Zealand Albums (RMNZ)	2
Norwegian Albums (VG-lista)	4
Swedish Albums (Sverigetopplistan)	3
UK Albums (Official Charts)	3
US Billboard 200	69

=== Year-end charts ===
Chart (1978)	Peak position
Dutch Albums (MegaCharts)	23
New Zealand Albums (RMNZ)	37
UK Albums (OCC)	50

Chart (1979)	Peak position
Dutch Albums (MegaCharts)	75

== Certifications and sales ==
Region	Certification	Certified units/sales
Australia	—	300,000
Canada (Music Canada)	Platinum	100,000^{^}
Netherlands (NVPI)	Platinum	100,000^{^}
New Zealand (RMNZ)	Platinum	15,000^{^}
United Kingdom (BPI)	Gold	100,000^{^}
^{^} Shipments figures based on certification alone.
