= Body Contact (film) =

- Directed by: Bernard Rose
- Written by: Lee Drysdale
- Starring: Harry Fowler; Christopher Fulford; Miriam Margolyes; Joely Richardson; Jack Shepherd
- Music by: Rick Fenn & Nick Mason
- Release date: 6 December 1987
- Running time: 75 minutes
- Country: United Kingdom
- Language: English

Body Contact is a 1987 film directed by Bernard Rose. Its soundtrack is by Rick Fenn & Nick Mason. After the Hungerford massacre, the BBC withdrew it from festivals and postponed its television screening, which was to occur on BBC1 on 20 September. The film eventually aired on Sunday, 6 December 1987.
