= Live at Hammersmith (Rick Wakeman album) =

Live album by Rick Wakeman
- Released: December 1985
- Recorded: Hammersmith Odeon, London, May 9, 1985
- Genre: Progressive rock
- Length: 59:30
- Label: President

Rick Wakeman chronology
Silent Nights (1985)	Live at Hammersmith (1985)	Country Airs (1986)

Professional ratings
Review scores
Source	Rating
Amazon	4.5/5 stars
Prog Archives	3.5/5 stars

Live at Hammersmith is the second live album by Rick Wakeman. Despite being a 1985 concert, the music performed is from the first three albums (1973–1975). During this show there was a power failure, and Wakeman walked to the front and told jokes for 45 minutes, although had to subsequently pay for running over time as the power had been restored after 3 minutes.

== Track listing ==
Side one
No.	Title	Length
1.	"Arthur"	13:02
2.	"Three Wives"	16:55

Side two
No.	Title	Length
3.	"Journey"	21:56
4.	"Merlin"	7:37

=== Song titles ===
Three of these songs have shorter or altered names:

- Three Wives is a made-up name implying this is a medley of 3 songs from the album The Six Wives of Henry VIII
- Journey is short for Journey to the Centre of the Earth
- Merlin is short for Merlin the Magician, a song from The Myths and Legends of King Arthur and the Knights of the Round Table

== Personnel ==
Musicians

- Rick Wakeman – keyboards
- Rick Fenn – guitars
- Chas Cronk – bass
- Gordon Neville – lead vocals, percussion
- Tony Fernandez – drums

Production

- John Acock – mixing
- Denis Blackham – mastering
