= Silent Nights =

Studio album by Rick Wakeman
- Released: March 1985
- Recorded: October–December 1984
- Studio: Herne Place (Sunningdale, Berkshire); Strawberry Hill (Dorking, Surrey)
- Genre: Progressive rock, hard rock
- Length: 42.13
- Label: President
- Producer: Rick Wakeman

Rick Wakeman chronology
Crimes of Passion (1984)	Silent Nights (1985)	Live at Hammersmith (1985)

Singles from Silent Nights
- 1. "Glory Boys" Released: December 1984; 2. "Silent Nights" Released: 1985 (Canada)

Professional ratings
Review scores
Source	Rating
AllMusic	2.5/5 stars

Silent Nights is a rock album released in March 1985 by Rick Wakeman.

The single to the album entitled "Glory Boys" got a large amount of airplay but the pressing plant where it was being made went on strike. Although the shops were ordering the single in large amounts, not many copies of the single were available to be purchased. This meant that the airplay for the single stopped as people found it hard to purchase a copy. Although the album was not a commercial success Wakeman has stated on his official site that "Glory Boys" is probably the best single he has ever released.

== Track listing ==
All titles composed and arranged by Rick Wakeman.

Side one
No.	Title	Length
1.	"Tell 'Em All You Know"	3:25
2.	"The Opening Line"	3:43
3.	"The Opera"	6:25
4.	"Man's Best Friend"	4:20
5.	"Glory Boys"	3:15

Side two
No.	Title	Length
1.	"Silent Nights"	3:54
2.	"Ghost of a Rock and Roll Star"	3:30
3.	"The Dancer"	3:15
4.	"Elgin Mansions"	5:20
5.	"That's Who I Am"	4:15

== Personnel ==
- Rick Wakeman - keyboards, vocals, lead vocal (B3)
- Rick Fenn - guitar
- Chas Cronk - bass guitar
- Bimbo Acock- saxophone (A3, B3)
- Gordon Neville - lead vocals on all tracks (except A4, B3, B4)
- Tony Fernandez - drums, percussion
