= Good Morning Judge =

Single by 10cc

from the album Deceptive Bends
- B-side: "Don't Squeeze Me Like Toothpaste"
- Released: April 1977
- Genre: Progressive pop; art rock; funk rock
- Length: 2:55
- Label: Mercury
- Songwriters: Eric Stewart; Graham Gouldman
- Producer: 10cc

10cc singles chronology
"The Things We Do for Love" (1976)	"Good Morning Judge" (1977)	"People in Love" (1977)

Music video
- "Good Morning Judge" on YouTube

"Good Morning Judge" is a song by English art rock band 10cc, released as the second single from their 1977 album Deceptive Bends. The song became the group's sixth consecutive Top 10 single in the United Kingdom, reaching No. 5.

Record World said that "this rather outrageous tale of shattered romance could be one of the year's most unusual hits" and commented on "the jagged, slicing guitar work." Cash Box said that "this up-tempo number dances with energetic upbeats and tight rhythmic changes" and that "all the appropriate sounds are there, from the low pitched harmonies to the manifold guitar effects and even the jingling tambourine."

== Music video ==
A music video was produced for the song that revolves around a fictional courtroom trial. It features Eric Stewart as the defendant who is alleged to have committed a grand theft auto, and Graham Gouldman as the judge in a court. Stewart and Gouldman also play various other characters with Paul Burgess, including members of the jury. The trial eventually ends with the conviction of the defendant, who is incarcerated.

== Personnel ==
- Eric Stewart – vocals, piano, Moog synthesizer, backing vocals, slide guitar
- Graham Gouldman – bass guitar, electric guitars, tambourine, backing vocals, six-string bass
- Paul Burgess – drums, tambourine, Wah piano, cabasa

== Chart performance ==
Chart (1977)	Peak position
Australia (Kent Music Report)	47
Belgium (Ultratop 50 Flanders)	20
Germany (GfK)	23
Netherlands (Single Top 100)	12
Sweden (Sverigetopplistan)	12
UK Singles (OCC)	5
US Billboard Hot 100	69
