= Rick Fenn =

English musical artist (born 1953)

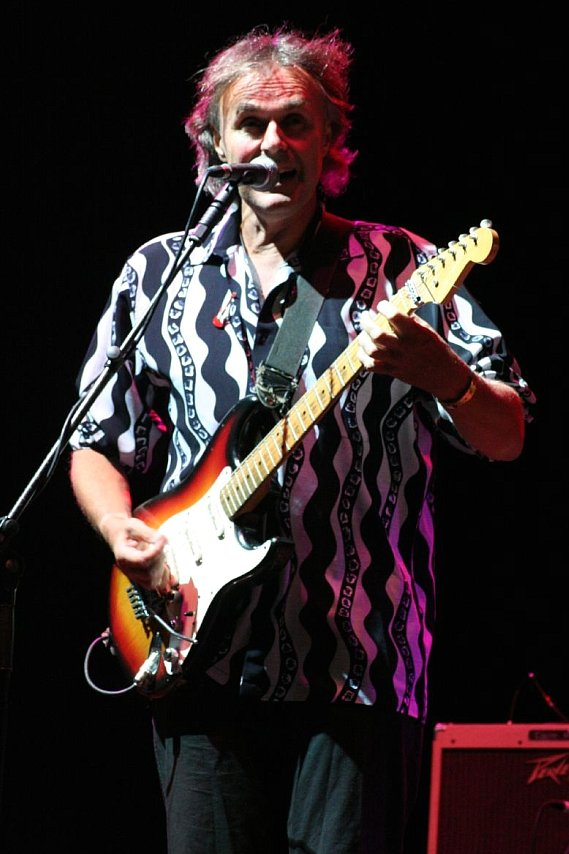
- Fenn performing live in 2006

Background information
- Born: Richard Fenn; 23 May 1953 (age 73)
- Education: Cambridge College of Arts and Technology
- Genre: Rock
- Occupation: Musician
- Instruments: Guitar; keyboards; vocals
- Years active: 1971–present

Richard Fenn (born 23 May 1953) is an English rock guitarist. He has been a member of the band 10cc since 1976 and has also collaborated with Mike Oldfield, Rick Wakeman, the Hollies singer Peter Howarth, and Pink Floyd drummer Nick Mason.

== History ==
Rick Fenn attended the Dragon School and Magdalen College School in Oxford. His musical career started in Oxford where he was leader of the school band Bagshot Louie. The band folded with the end of the school year in 1971, and Fenn moved to Cambridge, to attend the Cambridge College of Arts and Technology.

After completing an HND business studies course, Fenn joined a Cambridge band called Hamilton Gray who moved to Manchester and became the band Gentlemen. Their debut TV appearance on a show called So It Goes (along with the Sex Pistols) resulted in friendship with Paul Burgess, who soon afterward recommended him to 10cc, whom he joined towards the end of 1976 at the launch of the Deceptive Bends album and has been part of the team ever since.

From 1979 he also toured and recorded with Mike Oldfield, and with him co-wrote the song "Family Man" which went on to become a big hit for Hall & Oates all over the world and won him an ASCAP award for best song in 1984.

In 1985, Fenn wrote and recorded his own album Profiles with the Pink Floyd's drummer Nick Mason. The single from the album, "Lie for a Lie," was sung by David Gilmour and featured Maggie Reilly. Also in the 1980s Fenn and Mason formed Bamboo Music, a company that produced music jingles for corporate clients.

Over the years, Fenn has toured with artists such as Rick Wakeman, Jack Bruce, Elkie Brooks and Wax (with Andrew Gold and Graham Gouldman). As a guitarist he has recorded with numerous artists, among them Cliff Richard, Peter Green, Agnetha Fältskog (ABBA), Marilyn, Sniff 'n' the Tears, John Wetton, and Justin Hayward.

From the late 1980s, Fenn devoted more of his time to composing and wrote countless scores for television documentaries, dramas and comedies (including series for Hale and Pace and Craig Charles) and a number of feature films. Among these was White of the Eye which was another collaboration with Nick Mason. Over the years he has won several awards for high-profile commercial sound tracks.

One soundtrack that won Fenn a Gold Clio award in America in 1989 for best song, featured Peter Howarth on vocals. He went on to form a writing partnership with Howarth, now the lead singer with the Hollies, and in 1990 they wrote a rock opera called "Robin, Prince of Sherwood" which toured the UK for a year and spent four months in the West End. Fenn and Howarth have other projects in the pipeline. They also periodically assemble a troupe of prominent musicians and perform as the Feramones.

In 2008 Fenn toured throughout Germany as part of the Nokia Night of the Proms Band where, as well as 10cc, he played with Tears For Fears, Robin Gibb, Dennis DeYoung and Kim Wilde.

When not working with 10cc, Fenn now spends most of his time at his home near Byron Bay, Australia, where he has collaborated with Brian Cadd.

== Discography ==
=== With Mason + Fenn ===
Profiles – 1985
Life Could Be a Dream – 1986 (soundtrack)
White of the Eye – 1987 (soundtrack)
Body Contact – 1987 (soundtrack)
Tank Malling – 1989 (soundtrack)

=== With 10cc ===
Live and Let Live – 1977
Bloody Tourists – 1978
Look Hear? – 1980
Ten Out of 10 – 1981
Windows in the Jungle – 1983
Alive – 1993
Mirror Mirror – 1995
Clever Clogs – 2008

=== With Eric Stewart ===
Girls – 1980
Frooty Rooties – 1982

=== With Graham Gouldman ===
Animalympics – 1980
And Another Thing... – 2000
Love and Work – 2012

=== With Agnetha Fältskog ===
Eyes of a Woman – 1985

=== With Peter Howarth ===
Robin Prince of Sherwood – 1992
Androcles and the Lion – 1995
And Still I Fly – 2020

=== With Mike Oldfield ===
QE2 – 1980
Live at Montreux 1981 – 1981
Five Miles Out – 1982
Crises – 1983
Islands – 1987

=== With Rick Wakeman ===
Crimes of Passion (soundtrack) – 1984
Silent Nights – 1985
Live at Hammersmith – 1985

=== With Sniff 'n' the Tears ===
Love Action – 1981

=== With Michael Mantler ===
Live – 1987 – with Jack Bruce and Nick Mason
Many Have No Speech – with Jack Bruce, Marianne Faithfull and Robert Wyatt (Watt/ECM)
The Watt Works Family Album – (WATT/ECM)
Folly Seeing All This – 1993 (ECM)

=== With Peter Green ===
Blues for Dhyana – 1998
The Clown – 2001

=== With Tanita Tikaram ===
The Cappucino Songs – 1998

=== With Wax ===
Live in Concert 1987 – 2019
