= I Bought a Flat Guitar Tutor =

1977 song by 10cc

Song by 10cc

from the album Deceptive Bends
- Released: May 1977
- Studio: Strawberry Studios South (Dorking, Surrey)
- Genre: Novelty
- Length: 1:48
- Label: Mercury
- Songwriters: Eric Stewart; Graham Gouldman
- Producer: 10cc

Official audio
- "I Bought a Flat Guitar Tutor" on YouTube

"I Bought a Flat Guitar Tutor" is a song by the English rock band 10cc appearing on their fifth studio album, Deceptive Bends (1977).

The song is quite short and often thought of as a novelty piece amongst fans. The lyrics to the song are all puns for musical terminology. Whenever Eric Stewart sings the name of a chord, that chord is played as part of the music to the song. The chart below attempts to explain this idea.

- I bought A = A major (A C♯ E)
- [A] flat = A Flat major (A♭ C E♭)
- [A flat] diminished = A Flat diminished (A♭ Cb E♭♭)
- Responsibility (responsibilitE)= E Major (E G♯ B)
- You're de ninth = D9 (D F♯ A C E)
- Person to see = C Major (C E G)
- To be suspended = Bsus4 (B E F♯)
- in a seventh = A7 (A C♯ E G)
- [a seventh] major catastro- = A Major 7th (A C♯ E G♯)
- phe = E major (E G# B)
- It's a minor = A minor (A C E)
- point, but Gee = G major (G B D)
- [but gee,] Augmented = G augmented (G B D♯)
- [Gee, augmented] by the sharpness of your = G sharp augmented (G♯ B♯ D♯♯)
- See what I'm going through (C#) = C# Major
- A (A) = A Major
- to be (B) = B Major (B D♯ F♯) with you E major (E G# B)
- in a = A Major
- [in a] flat = A flat
- by the sea = C Major, C Major7, C 7, C & ad g
