= People in Love =

Single by 10cc

from the album Deceptive Bends
- B-side: "I'm So Laid Back I'm Laid Out"
- Released: May 1977 (US); 8 July 1977 (UK)
- Recorded: 1976
- Genre: Soft rock
- Length: 3:48
- Label: Mercury
- Songwriter(s): Eric Stewart, Graham Gouldman
- Producer(s): 10cc

10cc singles chronology
"Good Morning Judge" (1977)	"People in Love" (1977)	"Dreadlock Holiday" (1978)

Music video
- "People in Love" on YouTube

"People in Love" is a song written by Eric Stewart and Graham Gouldman that was first released by the British band 10cc on their 1977 album Deceptive Bends and as the third and final single from the album. The song reached No. 40 on the Billboard Hot 100 (their last Top 40 hit on that chart to date), No. 74 in Australia and No. 90 in Canada.

Record World said that it's "smooth, rather moody, and right for any number of formats."

Allmusic critic Dave Thompson called it "one of Gouldman/Stewart's sweetest ballads" and praised the "deliciously understated melody" and Stewart's vocal delivery. Thompson described the lyrics as basically a list the silly things people do when they are in love, such as "walk under buses, talk to the ceiling, and sit alone in the dark."

== Chart performance ==
Chart (1977)	Peak position
Australian Kent Music Report	74
Canadian RPM Top Singles	90
US Billboard Hot 100	40
