= The Things We Do for Love (song) =

1976 single by 10cc

- Artwork for UK/European release, also used for Japanese edition with different text layout

Single by 10cc

from the album Deceptive Bends
- B-side: "Hot to Trot"
- Released: 3 December 1976 (UK)
- Recorded: 1976
- Genre: Soft rock; yacht rock; progressive pop
- Length: 3:32
- Label: Mercury
- Songwriters: Eric Stewart, Graham Gouldman
- Producer: 10cc

10cc singles chronology
"I'm Mandy Fly Me" (1976)	"The Things We Do for Love" (1976)	"Good Morning Judge" (1977)

Music video
- "The Things We Do for Love" on YouTube

"The Things We Do for Love" is a song by English band 10cc, released as a single in 1976. It later featured on the album Deceptive Bends released in 1977 and was the group's first release after the departure of band members Kevin Godley and Lol Creme.

== Recording ==
The song originated during the How Dare You! sessions, but was unpopular with Godley and Creme. Eric Stewart recalled, "While we were recording it, Kevin was coming out with some heavy statements like, 'I don't want to do any more crap like this,' after I played 'The Things We Do for Love' to him and Lol."

== Reception ==
Record World called it a "well crafted tune with a crisp, pop sound". Cash Box called it a "pop record that combines the best of a strong Beatles influence with solid rock ’n’ roll and the luxuriant harmonies that characterized [10cc's] past efforts".

== Track listing ==
UK 7" single
A. "The Things We Do for Love" – 3:32
B. "Hot to Trot" – 4:28

== Personnel ==
- Eric Stewart – lead & backing vocals, electric lead guitar, piano, organ
- Graham Gouldman – bass, electric & acoustic rhythm guitars, tambourine, handclaps, backing vocals
- Paul Burgess – drums, tambourine, handclaps, gong

== Chart performance ==
The song was a hit in various countries worldwide, reaching No. 1 in Canada, as well as peaking at No. 6 in the UK, No. 5 in Australia, No. 13 in the Netherlands, No. 2 in Ireland and No. 5 in the US, where it reached gold status and became the band's best-selling single.

=== Weekly charts ===
Chart (1976–1977)	Peak position
Australia (Kent Music Report)	5
Canadian RPM Top Singles	1
Canadian RPM Adult Contemporary	12
Ireland (IRMA)	2
Netherlands (Single Top 100)	13
New Zealand	27
UK Singles (Official Charts)	6
US Billboard Hot 100	5
US Cash Box Top 100	4
US Billboard Adult Contemporary	12

=== Year-end charts ===
Chart (1977)	Rank
Australia (Kent Music Report)	37
Canada	12
US Billboard Hot 100	44
US Cash Box	11

=== Certifications ===
Region	Certification	Certified units/sales
New Zealand (RMNZ)	Platinum	30,000^{‡}
United States (RIAA)	Gold	1,000,000^{^}
^{^} Shipments figures based on certification alone.^{‡} Sales+streaming figures based on certification alone.

== Amy Grant version ==
"The Things We Do for Love"

Single by Amy Grant
- Released: February 1996
- Genre: Adult contemporary
- Label: A&M
- Songwriters: Eric Stewart, Graham Gouldman

Amy Grant singles chronology
"Oh How the Years Go By" (1995)	"The Things We Do for Love" (1996)	"Takes a Little Time" (1997)

"The Things We Do for Love" was covered by Amy Grant for the soundtrack to the 1996 film Mr. Wrong. Her version reached number 24 on the U.S. Adult Contemporary chart. It was a bigger hit in Canada, where it reached number 41 on the Pop singles chart and number 8 on the Adult Contemporary chart. It is ranked as the 96th biggest Adult Contemporary hit of 1996.

=== Weekly charts ===
Chart (1996)	Peak position
Canada RPM Adult Contemporary	8
Canada RPM Top Singles	41
US Adult Contemporary (Billboard)	24

=== Year-end charts ===
Chart (1996)	Rank
US Billboard Adult Contemporary	96

== Tina Arena version ==
"The Things We Do for Love"

Single by Tina Arena
- Released: 4 November 2014
- Recorded: 2014
- Genre: Pop
- Length: 3:08
- Label: Positive Dream, EMI
- Songwriters: Eric Stewart, Graham Gouldman

Tina Arena singles chronology
"Still Running" (2014)	"The Things We Do for Love" (2014)	"I Want to Love You" (2015)

Australian singer Tina Arena released her version in November 2014, with money raised going towards the National Breast Cancer Foundation.

Australian department store David Jones used the song in its 2014 Christmas campaign.

=== Track listing ===
1-track download

1. "The Things We Do for Love" - 3:08

4-track download

1. "Last Christmas" - 3:59
2. "The Things We Do for Love" (pop mix) - 3:21
3. "Only Lonely" - 3:22
4. "You Set Fire to My Life" (acoustic mix) - 4:22

=== Charts ===
Chart (2014)	Peak position
Australia (ARIA)	709

== Other versions ==
The song was covered in 2007 by American alternative rock band Lazlo Bane for their '70s covers album Guilty Pleasures.
