= Dreadlock Holiday =

Single by 10cc

from the album Bloody Tourists
- B-side: "Nothing Can Move Me"
- Released: July 1978
- Recorded: Strawberry Studios South, Dorking, Surrey, England, 1977
- Genre: Reggae-pop; reggae rock
- Length: 4:28; 5:01 (long version)
- Label: Mercury
- Songwriters: Eric Stewart; Graham Gouldman
- Producer: 10cc

10cc singles chronology
"People in Love" (1977)	"Dreadlock Holiday" (1978)	"For You and I" (1978)

"Dreadlock Holiday" is a reggae song by 10cc. Written by Eric Stewart and Graham Gouldman, it was the lead single from the band's 1978 album Bloody Tourists. It was a number one hit in several countries.

== Composition ==
The song was based on real events Eric Stewart and Moody Blues vocalist Justin Hayward experienced in Barbados, and Graham Gouldman experienced in Jamaica. Graham Gouldman commented: "Some of the experiences that are mentioned are true, and some of them are ... fairly true!" Stewart recalled seeing a white man "trying to be cool and he looked so naff" walking into a group of Afro-Caribbeans and being reprimanded, which became the lyric "Don't you walk through my words, you got to show some respect". Another lyric came from a conversation Gouldman had with a Jamaican, who when asked if he liked cricket replied, "No, I love it!".

== Music video ==
The music video for the song was directed by Storm Thorgerson. The beach scene in the official video was filmed on the Dorset coast near Charmouth.

== Reception ==
"Dreadlock Holiday" became the group's international number 1 hit topping the charts in the UK, Belgium, New Zealand and The Netherlands. The single also reached number 2 in Ireland and Australia, became a top 10 hit in Norway and Switzerland and top 20 in Germany and Sweden. In Austria the song was 10cc's sole entry in the charts, peaking at number 18.

In North America, "Dreadlock Holiday" became a minor hit, peaking at number 45 in Canada's RPM charts and number 44 on the US Billboard Hot 100. When asked why he thought the song did not do better in the US, Gouldman said, "We got a report from one station that said, 'Oh, we don't play reggae'."

In the UK, the song was the band's third number 1 and at the same time final top 10 hit.

In a 2025 interview, Gouldman responded to claims that the song's lyrics perpetuated stereotypes about the Caribbean by stating that while people from the region he had encountered had expressed uniformly positive opinions, he would not today write the line, “I saw four faces, one mad, a brother from the gutter”.

== Charts ==
=== Weekly charts ===
Chart (1978)	Peak position
Australia (Kent Music Report)	2
Austria (Ö3 Austria Top 40)	18
Belgium (Ultratop 50 Flanders)	1
Canada (RPM) Top Singles	45
Ireland (IRMA)	2
Netherlands (Dutch Top 40)	1
Netherlands (Single Top 100)	1
New Zealand (Recorded Music NZ)	1
Norway (VG-lista)	7
Sweden (Sverigetopplistan)	16
Switzerland (Schweizer Hitparade)	5
UK Singles (Official Charts)	1
US Billboard Hot 100	44
West Germany (GfK)	11

=== Year-end charts ===
Chart (1978)	Position
Australia (Kent Music Report)	27
Belgium (Ultratop 50 Flanders)	15
Netherlands (Dutch Top 40)	5
Netherlands (Single Top 100)	15
New Zealand (Top 40 Singles)	22
UK	12

== Certifications ==
Region	Certification	Certified units/sales
Netherlands (NVPI)	Gold	100,000^{‡}
New Zealand (RMNZ)	3× Platinum	90,000^{‡}
United Kingdom (BPI)	Gold	400,000^{‡}
^{‡} Sales+streaming figures based on certification alone.

== Usage in media ==
- In 2000, Guy Ritchie's film Snatch contained the song.
- The song is used in the first episode of The Mighty Boosh, "Killeroo". It is danced to by Rich Fulcher's character, Bob Fossil, who cuts the song off after the lyric, "I don't like cricket" before saying, "And that's why I don't like cricket."
- In 2002, Intenso Project sampled the track in their hit "Luv Da Sunshine".
- In 2010, David Fincher's film The Social Network contained the song being mixed by a college DJ.
- The song has been used as the theme music for cricket programming in the UK on Sky Sports.
- The song is used in the 2013 film Life of Crime.
- The song appears in the 2016 video game Watch Dogs 2.
- The song was used in the 2019 Christmas Special of Gavin and Stacey.
