= Art for Art's Sake (song) =

Single by 10cc

from the album How Dare You!
- B-side: "Get It While You Can"
- Released: 21 November 1975
- Recorded: 1975
- Genre: Progressive rock
- Length: 4:11 (single edit); 6:01 (album version)
- Label: Mercury
- Songwriters: Eric Stewart, Graham Gouldman
- Producer: 10cc

10cc singles chronology
"I'm Not in Love" (1975)	"Art for Art's Sake" (1975)	"I'm Mandy Fly Me" (1976)

"Art for Art's Sake" is a single by 10cc released in 1975. It was taken from the How Dare You! album, and, in an edited version, reached No. 5 on the UK singles chart.

The title of the song derives from the fact that Graham Gouldman's father, Hymie Gouldman, often used to say "Art for art's sake, money for God's sake, okay".

The wordless tape-loop vocals used by the band in their ground-breaking hit "I'm Not in Love" are also clearly audible in the slow sections of the song.

Record World called it "a spirited tour-de-force of vocal and production technique with an irresistible hook" and "a great sound."

== Personnel ==
- Eric Stewart – lead vocal, grand piano, electric piano, six string bass, fuzz bass, lead guitar
- Graham Gouldman – electric guitars, cow bell, tambourine, backing vocals
- Lol Creme – 2nd lead vocal, electric guitars, maracas, Moog synthesizer, recorder, backing vocals
- Kevin Godley – drums, temple blocks, backing vocals

== Chart performance ==
=== Weekly charts ===
Chart (1975/6)	Peak position
UK Singles Chart	5
Australia ARIA Charts	61
Canada RPM (magazine)	69
Irish Singles Chart	4
New Zealand (Recorded Music NZ)	6
US Billboard Hot 100	83

=== Year-end charts ===
Chart (1976)	Rank
New Zealand (Top 40 Singles)	34
