= How Dare You! (album) =

Studio album by 10cc
- Released: January 1976
- Recorded: 1975
- Studios: Strawberry Studios, Stockport, Greater Manchester, England
- Genres: Art rock; pop
- Length: 42:53
- Label: Mercury
- Producer: 10cc

10cc chronology
100cc (1975)	How Dare You! (1976)	Deceptive Bends (1977)

Singles from How Dare You!
- 1. "Art for Art's Sake" Released: November 1975; 2. "I'm Mandy Fly Me" Released: March 1976

How Dare You! is the fourth studio album by the English band 10cc. Released in 1976, it included UK hit singles "I'm Mandy Fly Me" and "Art for Art's Sake". The album was the band's third to have cover artwork by the Hipgnosis creative team.

It was also the last 10cc album by the original line-up of Eric Stewart, Graham Gouldman, Kevin Godley and Lol Creme (the latter two departed shortly thereafter to form Godley & Creme), until the four reformed (albeit briefly) for the 1992 album ...Meanwhile.

== Writing and recording ==
In an interview at the time of its release, Gouldman told Melody Maker music newspaper: "It's as different as any album by the same band can be, and I think it's a progression from the last one. I think there's been a progression on every album and I think we've done it again. It's a strange mixture of songs. There's one about divorce, a song about schizophrenia, a song about wanting to rule the world, the inevitable money song, and an instrumental".

== Critical reception ==
Professional ratings
Review scores
Source	Rating
Allmusic	4/5 stars
Christgau's Record Guide	C
Jerk Music Critic	4/5 stars
Uncut	4/5 stars

Village Voice critic Robert Christgau wrote in his review of the album: "The putrefaction isn't as extreme as on last year's hit album, but the affliction would seem permanent—they don't know whether they're supposed to be funny or pretty, and so nine times out of ten they're neither."

== Track listing ==
Side one
No.	Title	Writer(s)	Lead vocals	Length
1.	"How Dare You"	Kevin Godley; Lol Creme	instrumental	4:14
2.	"Lazy Ways"	Creme; Eric Stewart	Stewart	4:20
3.	"I Wanna Rule the World"	Godley; Creme; Graham Gouldman	Creme	3:57
4.	"I'm Mandy Fly Me"	Stewart; Gouldman; Godley	Stewart	5:24
5.	"Iceberg"	Gouldman; Godley	Gouldman and Godley	3:43

Side two
No.	Title	Writer(s)	Lead vocals	Length
6.	"Art for Art's Sake"	Stewart; Gouldman	Stewart, Gouldman and Creme	5:59
7.	"Rock 'n' Roll Lullaby"	Gouldman; Stewart	Godley and Stewart	3:58
8.	"Head Room"	Godley; Creme	Creme and Stewart	4:21
9.	"Don't Hang Up"	Godley; Creme	Godley	6:16

=== Bonus tracks on the 1997 CD edition ===
No.	Title	Writer(s)	Lead vocals	Length
10.	"Get It While You Can"	Gouldman; Stewart	Stewart	2:53

=== Bonus tracks on Japanese 2008 CD edition ===
No.	Title	Writer(s)	Lead vocals	Length
10.	"Art for Art's Sake (Single Edit)"	Stewart; Gouldman	Stewart and Creme	4:11
11.	"Get It While You Can"	Gouldman; Stewart	Stewart	2:53
12.	"I'm Mandy Fly Me (Single edit)"	Stewart; Gouldman; Godley	Stewart	4:40

== Personnel ==
Credits sourced from the original album liner notes.

10cc

- Eric Stewart – lead (2, 4, 6, 7) and backing vocals (3, 4, 7–9), lead guitar (all tracks), piano (4, 6, 7), bass guitar (2, 6), electric piano (4, 6, 7), pedal steel (7), Levi zipper (5)
- Lol Creme – lead (3, 6, 8) and backing vocals (2–7, 9), Moog synthesizer (1, 2, 4, 6, 7, 9), piano (2, 3, 9), rhythm guitar (1, 6–8), lead guitar (1, 4, 9), maracas (1, 6, 7, 9), clavinet (1, 2), organ (3, 5), Gizmo (5, 9), electric piano (8, 9), sleigh bells (1), tambourine (2), vibraphone (4), recorder (6), handclaps (9)
- Graham Gouldman – lead (5, 6) and backing vocals (2–6, 8, 9), bass guitar (1, 3–5, 7–9), rhythm guitar (2, 5, 6), tambourine (2, 6), zither (4), cowbell (6), glockenspiel (7), slide guitar (7), handclaps (9), Spanish guitar (9)
- Kevin Godley – lead (5, 7, 9) and backing vocals (all but 1), drums (1–4, 6–8), congas (1, 5), timpani (3, 5), cowbell (1), bongos (1), triangle (2), maracas (3), temple blocks (6), tambourine (8), castanets (9), cabasa (9), handclaps (9), bass drum (9)

Additional musician

- Mair Jones – harp (9)

== Charts ==
=== Weekly charts ===
Chart (1976)	Peak position
Australian Albums (Kent Music Report)	15
Canada Top Albums/CDs (RPM)	5
Dutch Albums (Album Top 100)	7
New Zealand Albums (RMNZ)	1
Norwegian Albums (VG-lista)	7
Swedish Albums (Sverigetopplistan)	10
UK Albums (Official Charts)	5
US Billboard 200	46

=== Year-end charts ===
Chart (1976)	Position
Canada Top Albums/CDs (RPM)	40
New Zealand Albums (RMNZ)	10
UK Albums (OCC)	19

== Certifications ==
Region	Certification	Certified units/sales
Australia (ARIA)	Gold	20,000^{^}
^{^} Shipments figures based on certification alone.
