= 10cc =

English art rock band

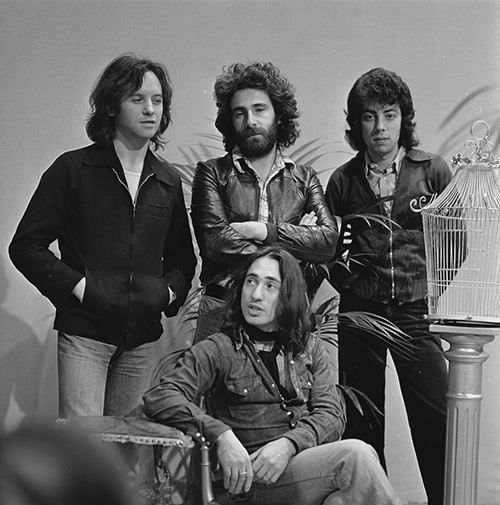
- 10cc appearing on TopPop in Hilversum, Netherlands, 1974: (clockwise from top left) Eric Stewart, Kevin Godley, Graham Gouldman, Lol Creme

Background information
- Origin: Stockport, England
- Genres: Art rock; art pop; progressive pop; soft rock; pop rock
- Years active: 1972–1983; 1991–1995; 1999–present
- Labels: UK; Mercury; Polydor; Avex
- Spinoffs: Godley & Creme; GG/06; Wax
- Spinoff of: Hotlegs
- Members: Graham Gouldman; Rick Fenn; Keith Hayman; Iain Hornal; Andy Park; Ben Stone
- Past members: Eric Stewart; Lol Creme; Kevin Godley; Paul Burgess; Stuart Tosh; Tony O'Malley; Duncan Mackay; Vic Emerson; Steve Piggot; Gary Wallis; Mick Wilson; Mike Stevens
- Website: 10cc.world

10cc are an English rock band formed in 1972 by four musicians who had written and recorded together at their own studio, Strawberry Studios, in Stockport near Manchester since 1968. The group initially consisted of Graham Gouldman, Eric Stewart, Kevin Godley, and Lol Creme. The four members contributed to songwriting, working together in various permutations. Godley and Creme’s songwriting has been said to be inspired by art and cinema. The four members were multi-instrumentalists, singers, writers and producers. Most of the band's records were recorded at their own Strawberry Studios (North) in Stockport and Strawberry Studios (South) in Dorking, with the majority of those engineered by Stewart.

From 1972 to 1978, 10cc had five consecutive UK top-ten albums: Sheet Music (1974), The Original Soundtrack (1975), How Dare You! (1976), Deceptive Bends (1977), and Bloody Tourists (1978). 10cc had twelve singles reach the UK Top 40, three of which were chart-toppers "Rubber Bullets" (1973), "I'm Not in Love" (1975), and "Dreadlock Holiday" (1978). "I'm Not in Love" was their breakthrough worldwide hit and is known for its innovative backing track.

In 1976, Godley and Creme left 10cc to concentrate on developing an electronic music device, "The Gizmo", and being in video production and music as a duo. Stewart left the band in 1995, after which they did not record or release any further studio albums. Since 1999, Gouldman has led a touring version of 10cc.

== 1963–1968: Early days; The Mockingbirds; The Mindbenders ==
Lol Creme, Kevin Godley, and Graham Gouldman were childhood friends in the Manchester area. As boys, Godley and Creme knew each other, and remained in touch while studying at separate art colleges; Gouldman and Godley attended the same secondary school, and their musical enthusiasm led to their playing at the local Jewish Lads' Brigade. Eric Stewart was born in Droylsden, a housing overflow area for neighbouring Manchester, and now part of Greater Manchester. Godley and Creme studied at art college until 1968. Creme was at Birmingham School of Art where he gained a BA degree, while Godley was at Stoke-on-Trent Regional College of Art (now Stoke-on-Trent College of Art).

While at art college, Godley played briefly in local band The Sabres (later to become The Magic Lanterns), while in 1963 Gouldman formed The Whirlwinds, which in 1964 released the first collaboration between any of the four future 10cc members when Gouldman and The Whirlwinds recorded the Lol Creme composition "Baby Not Like You", as the B-side of their only single, "Look At Me". The Whirlwinds then changed their name to The Mockingbirds, with Gouldman on bass, and Godley joining as drummer. The Mockingbirds recorded five singles in 1965 and 1966, including "That's How (It's Gonna Stay)" (1965), without any success, before dissolving.

Guitarist Eric Stewart became a member of Wayne Fontana and the Mindbenders, a group that hit No. 1 with "The Game of Love", and scored a number of other mid-1960s hits. When Fontana left the band in October 1965, the group became known simply as the Mindbenders, with Stewart as their lead vocalist. The band scored a hit with "A Groovy Kind of Love" (released December 1965) and made an appearance in the 1967 film To Sir, with Love with "It's Getting Harder All the Time" and "Off and Running". In March 1968, Gouldman joined Stewart in the Mindbenders, replacing bassist Bob Lang and playing on some tour dates. Gouldman wrote two of the band's last three singles, "Schoolgirl" (released November 1967) and "Uncle Joe the Ice Cream Man" (August 1968). Those singles did not chart, and the Mindbenders broke up after a short tour of England in November.

In June 1967, Godley and Creme got together and recorded a solitary single ("Seeing Things Green" b/w "Easy Life" on UK CBS) under the name "The Yellow Bellow Room Boom". In 1969, Gouldman took them to a Marmalade Records recording session. The boss of Marmalade Records, Giorgio Gomelsky, was impressed with Godley's falsetto voice and offered them a recording contract. In September 1969, Godley & Creme recorded some basic tracks at Strawberry Studios, with Stewart on guitar and Gouldman on bass. The song, "I'm Beside Myself" b/w "Animal Song", was released as a single, credited to Frabjoy and Runcible Spoon.

Gomelsky (an ex-manager of The Yardbirds) planned to market Godley & Creme as a duo, in the vein of Simon & Garfunkel. Plans for an album by Frabjoy and Runcible Spoon faltered, however, when Marmalade ran out of funds. Solo tracks by Godley and Gouldman, however–both involved Stewart and Creme–were released on a 1969 Marmalade Records compilation album, 100 Proof. Gouldman's track was "The Late Mr. Late"; a year later, Godley's song "To Fly Away" reappeared as "Fly Away", in the debut Hotlegs album, Thinks: School Stinks.

Gouldman, meanwhile, had made a name for himself as a hit songwriter for The Yardbirds, The Hollies, Herman's Hermits, and Jeff Beck, writing hits such as "Heart Full of Soul", "For Your Love", "Look Through Any Window," "Bus Stop", and "No Milk Today".

== 1968–1970: Birth of Strawberry Studios; the bubblegum era ==
In the dying days of the Mindbenders, Stewart began recording demos of new material at Inner City Studios, a Stockport studio then owned by Peter Tattersall, a former road manager for Billy J. Kramer and the Dakotas. In July 1968, Stewart joined Tattersall as a partner in the studio, where he could further hone his skills as a recording engineer. In October 1968, the studio was moved to bigger premises and renamed Strawberry Studios, after the Beatles' "Strawberry Fields Forever".

In 1969, Gouldman began using Strawberry to record demos of songs he was writing for Marmalade. He had become much more in demand as a songwriter than as a performer. By the end of the year, he too was a financial partner in the studios.

By 1969, all four members of the original 10cc line-up were working together regularly at Strawberry Studios. Around the same time, American bubblegum pop writer-producers Jerry Kasenetz and Jeffry Katz of Super K Productions came to England and commissioned Gouldman to write and produce formulaic bubblegum songs, many of which were recorded at Strawberry Studios, and were either augmented or performed entirely by varying combinations of the future 10cc line-up. Among the recordings from this period was "Sausalito", a No. 86 US hit credited to Ohio Express and released in July 1969. The track had Gouldman on lead vocals, with vocal and instrumental backing by the other three future 10cc members.

In December 1969, Kasenetz and Katz agreed to a proposal by Gouldman that he work solely at Strawberry, rather than move constantly between Stockport, London and New York. Gouldman convinced the pair that these throwaway two-minute songs could all be written, performed and produced by him and his three colleagues, Stewart, Godley and Creme, at a fraction of the cost of hiring outside session musicians. Kasenetz and Katz booked the studio for three months.

Godley recalled:

We did a lot of tracks in a very short time – it was really like a machine. Twenty tracks in about two weeks – a lot of crap really – really shit. We used to do the voices, everything – it saved 'em money. We even did the female backing vocals.

The three-month project resulted in a number of tracks that appeared under various band names owned by Kasenetz-Katz, including "There Ain't No Umbopo" by Crazy Elephant, "When He Comes" by Fighter Squadron and "Come on Plane" by Silver Fleet (all three with lead vocals by Godley), and "Susan's Tuba" by Freddie and the Dreamers (which was a hit in France and featured lead vocals by Freddie Garrity, despite claims by some that it was Gouldman). Lol Creme remembered: "Singles kept coming out under strange names that had really been recorded by us. I've no idea how many there were, or what happened to them all."

But Stewart described the Kasenetz-Katz deal as a breakthrough: "That allowed us to get the extra equipment to turn it into a real studio. To begin with they were interested in Graham's songwriting and when they heard that he was involved in a studio I think they thought the most economical thing for them to do would be to book his studio and then put him to work there – but they ended up recording Graham's songs and then some of Kevin and Lol's songs, and we were all working together."

== 1970–1971: Hotlegs; Doctor Father; The New Wave Band; Festival ==
When the three-month production deal with Kasenetz-Katz ended, Gouldman returned to New York to work as a staff songwriter for Super K Productions and the remaining three continued to dabble in the studio.

With Gouldman absent, Godley, Creme and Stewart continued recording singles. The first, "Neanderthal Man", released under the name Hotlegs, began life as a test of drum layering at the new Strawberry Studios mixing desk, but when released as a single by Fontana Records in July 1970, climbed to No. 2 on the UK Singles Chart and became a worldwide hit, selling more than two million copies. Around the same time, the trio released "Umbopo" under the name of Doctor Father. The song, a slower, longer and more melancholic version of the track earlier released under the name of Crazy Elephant, failed to chart.

Using the successful band name Hotlegs, in early 1971 Godley, Creme and Stewart recorded the album Thinks: School Stinks, which included "Neanderthal Man". They then recalled Gouldman for a short tour supporting the Moody Blues, before releasing a follow-up single "Lady Sadie" b/w (Backed With) "The Loser". Philips Records reworked their sole album, removing "Neanderthal Man" and adding "Today", and issued it as Song. Stewart, Creme and Godley released another single in February 1971 under yet another name, The New Wave Band, this time with former Herman's Hermits member Derek "Lek" Leckenby on guitar. The song, a cover version of Paul Simon's "Cecilia", was one of the few tracks the band released that they had not written. It also failed to chart.

The band continued outside production work at Strawberry, working with Dave Berry, Wayne Fontana, Peter Cowap and Herman's Hermits, and doing original compositions for various UK football (soccer) teams. In 1971 they produced and played on Space Hymns, an album by New Age musician Ramases; in 1972–73 they co-produced and played on two Neil Sedaka albums, Solitaire and The Tra-La Days Are Over. The experience of working on Solitaire, which became a success for Sedaka, was enough to prompt the band to seek recognition on their own merits. Gouldman—who by 1972 was back at Strawberry Studios—said:

It was Neil Sedaka's success that did it, I think. We'd just been accepting any job we were offered and were getting really frustrated. We knew that we were worth more than that, but it needed something to prod us into facing that. We were a bit choked to think that we'd done the whole of Neil's first album with him just for flat session fees when we could have been recording our own material.

Stewart said the decision was made over a meal in a Chinese restaurant: "We asked ourselves whether we shouldn't pool our creative talents and try to do something with the songs that each of us was working on at the time." Once again a four-piece, the group re-recorded the Hotlegs track "Today" (b/w a new Stewart/Gouldman song "Warm Me"), which was released under the name Festival. The single failed to chart, and the band moved on to record a Stewart/Gouldman song, "Waterfall", in early 1972. Stewart offered the acetate to Apple Records. He waited months before receiving a note from the label saying the song was not commercial enough to release as a single.

== 1972–1976: Original line-up ==
Undeterred by Apple's rejection, the group decided to plug another song which had been written as a possible B-side to "Waterfall", a Godley/Creme composition titled "Donna". The song was a Frank Zappa-influenced 1950s doo-wop parody, a sharp mix of commercial pop and irony with a chorus sung in falsetto. Stewart said: "We knew it had something. We only knew of one person who was mad enough to release it, and that was Jonathan King." Stewart called King, who drove to Strawberry, listened to the track and "fell about laughing", declaring: "It's fabulous, it's a hit."

10cc in 1973 (l–r): Gouldman, Godley, Stewart, Creme (from the 10cc album press-kit)

King signed the band to his UK Records label in July 1972 and dubbed them 10cc. By his own account, King chose the name after having a dream in which he was standing in front of the Hammersmith Odeon in London where the boarding read "10cc The Best Band in the World". A widely repeated claim, disputed by King and Godley, but confirmed in a 1988 interview with Creme, is that the band name represented ten cubic centimetres, a volume of semen that was the average amount ejaculated (according to Creme), thus emphasizing their potency or prowess.

However, in a 2025 interview, Gouldman stated: "We got bored with giving the long-winded reason for how we got the name, then someone told us the average male ejaculation was 9cc. Since we were 1cc more, we started saying it was the average male ejaculation. Is it a real fact? I have no idea! But it is now." "Donna", released as the first 10cc single, was chosen by BBC Radio 1 disc jockey Tony Blackburn as his Record of the Week, helping to launch it into the Top 30. The song peaked at No. 2 in the UK in October 1972.

Although their second single, a similarly 1950s-influenced song called "Johnny Don't Do It", was not a major chart success, "Rubber Bullets", a catchy satirical take on the "Jailhouse Rock" concept, became a hit internationally and gave 10cc their first British No. 1 single in June 1973. They consolidated their success a few months later with "The Dean and I", which peaked at No. 10 in September. They released two singles, "Headline Hustler" (in the US) and the self-mocking "The Worst Band in the World" (in the UK) and launched a UK tour on 26 August 1973, joined by second drummer Paul Burgess, before returning to Strawberry Studios in November to record the remainder of their second LP, Sheet Music (1974), which included "The Worst Band in the World" along with other hits "The Wall Street Shuffle" (No. 10, 1974) and "Silly Love" (No. 24, 1974). Sheet Music became the band's breakthrough album, remaining on the UK charts for six months and paving the way for a US tour in February 1974.

In February 1975, the band announced they were splitting with Jonathan King and that they had signed with Mercury Records for US$1 million. The catalyst for the deal was one song: "I'm Not in Love". Stewart recalled:

At that point in time we were still on Jonathan King's label, but struggling. We were absolutely skint, the lot of us, we were really struggling seriously, and Philips Phonogram wanted to do a deal with us. They wanted to buy Jonathan's contract. Our manager Ric Dixon invited them to listen to what we've done. Head of A & R Nigel Grainge came up to our Strawberry Studio, heard the album and freaked. He said "This is a masterpiece, it's a done deal!". We did a five-year deal with them for five albums and they paid us a serious amount of money. It was Grainge's idea to release 'Life Is A Minestrone' as the first single holding back the big one to give us more longevity for the album.

Speaking in the BBC Four documentary I'm Not in Love: The Story of 10cc in 2015, Stewart expanded on the background, explaining that their royalty returns under the contract with King were a mere 4%.Creme therefore planned to sign with Richard Branson's new Virgin label. Stewart and Creme gave power of attorney to their manager Harvey Lisberg to finalise the deal, as they were both to go on holiday. Contrary to their instructions, Lisberg then accepted a revised offer from Phonogram. Creme said that he felt "horrified, embarrassed and disgusted – to this day I still am".

The Original Soundtrack, which was already complete, was released just weeks later. It was both a critical and commercial success, and featured distinctive cover art created by the Hipgnosis team and drawn by musician and artist Humphrey Ocean.

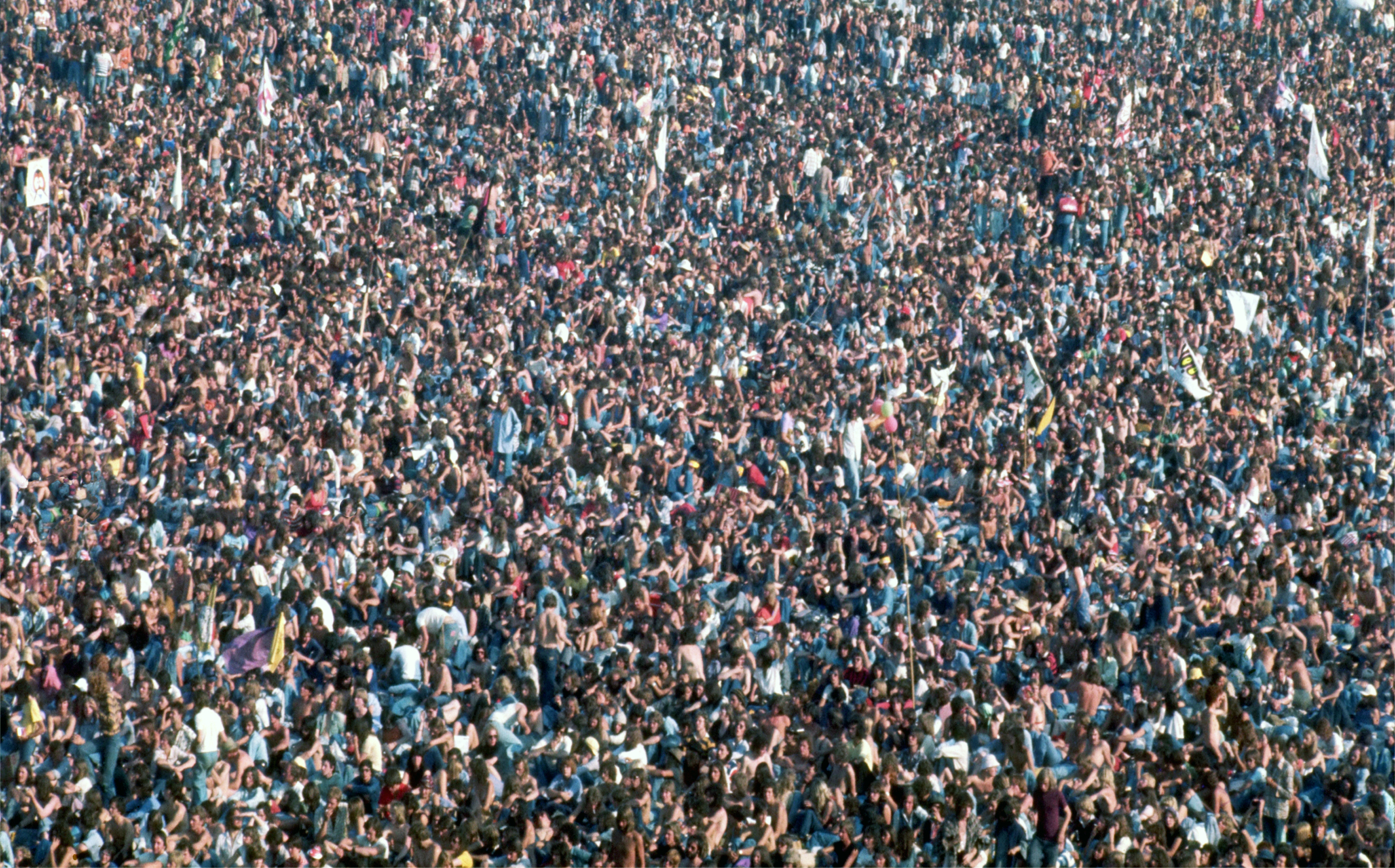
10cc crowd at a concert in Knebworth, England, near Stevenage, with an attendance of 120,000, 1976

Although it bore an unlikely title (picked up from a radio talk show), "Life Is a Minestrone" (1975) was another UK Top 10 placing, peaking at No. 7. Their biggest success came with "I'm Not in Love", which gave the band their second UK No. 1 in June 1975. The song provided them with their first US chart success when the song reached No. 2. A collaborative effort built around a title by Stewart, "I'm Not in Love" is notable for its innovative production, especially its richly overdubbed choral backing. Godley said:

If I was to pick one track from everything we've done, "I'm Not in Love" would be my favourite. It's got something that none of our other tracks have at all. It's not clever in a conscious way but it says it all so simply in, what, six minutes. – NME, February 1976

During that time, 10cc collaborated with Justin Hayward on the single "Blue Guitar", being a backing band and doing production work. The song appeared on later reissues of the Blue Jays album by Hayward and John Lodge.

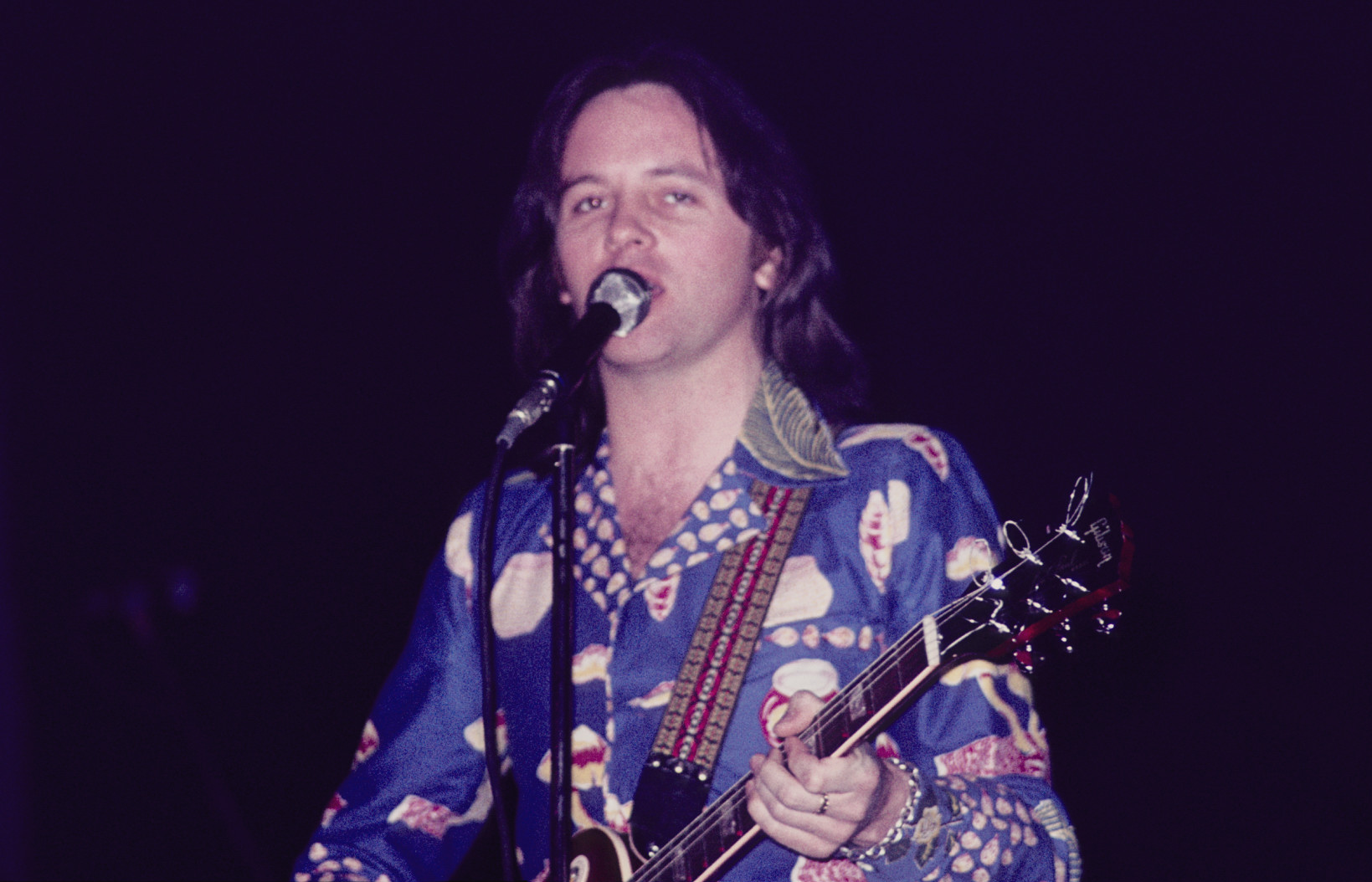
Eric Stewart performing with 10cc in Mannheim, Germany, April 1976

10cc's fourth LP, How Dare You! (1976), featuring another Hipgnosis cover, furnished two more UK Top Ten hits—the witty "Art for Art's Sake" (No. 5 in January 1976) and "I'm Mandy, Fly Me" (No. 6, April 1976). However, by this time the once close personal and working relationships between the four members had begun to fray, and it was the last album with the original line-up. 10cc's success prompted the 1976 re-release of the Hotlegs album under the new title You Didn't Like It Because You Didn't Think of It with two additional tracks. The title track was the epic B-side of "Neanderthal Man", a section of which had been reworked as "Fresh Air for My Mama" on the 10cc album.

== 1976: Split ==
Frictions mounted between the group's two creative teams during the recording of How Dare You, with each pair realising how far apart their ideas had become. At the beginning of the sessions for the band's fifth album, further creative differences occurred; and Godley and Creme left 10cc to work on a project that eventually evolved into the triple-LP set Consequences (1977), a sprawling concept album that featured contributions from satirist Peter Cook and jazz vocalist Sarah Vaughan.

The first of a series of albums by Godley & Creme, Consequences began as a demonstration record for the "Gizmotron", an electric guitar effect they had invented. The device, which fitted over the bridge of an electric guitar, contained six small motor-driven wheels attached to small keys (four wheels for electric basses); when the key was depressed, the Gizmotron wheels bowed the guitar strings, producing notes and chords with endless sustain. First used during the recording of the Sheet Music track "Old Wild Men", the device was designed to further cut their recording costs: by using it on an electric guitar with studio effects, they could effectively simulate strings and other sounds, enabling them to dispense with expensive orchestral overdubs.

In a 2007 interview with the ProGGnosis—Progressive Rock & Fusion website, Godley said: "We left because we no longer liked what Gouldman and Stewart were writing. We left because 10cc was becoming safe and predictable and we felt trapped." But speaking to Uncut magazine 10 years earlier, he expressed regret about the band breaking up as they embarked on the Consequences project:

We'd reached a certain crossroads with 10cc and already spent three weeks on the genesis of what turned out to be Consequences ... The stuff that we were coming up with didn't have any home, we couldn't import it into 10cc. And we were kind of constrained by 10cc live ... We felt like creative people who should give ourselves the opportunity to be as creative as possible and leaving seemed to be the right thing to do at that moment.

Unfortunately, the band wasn't democratic or smart enough at that time to allow us the freedom to go ahead and do this project and we were placed in the unfortunate position of having to leave to do it. Looking back, it was a very northern work ethic being applied to the group, all for one and one for all. If we'd been a little more free in our thinking with regard to our work practices, the band as a corporate and creative entity could have realised that it could have been useful rather than detrimental for two members to spend some time developing and then bring whatever they'd learned back to the corporate party. Unfortunately, that wasn't to be.

Our contemporaries were people like Roxy Music who allowed that to happen and they gained from that ... Had we been allowed to get it out of our system and come back home, who knows what would have happened.

In a BBC Radio Wales interview Stewart gave his side of the split:

I was sorry to see them go. But we certainly did fall out at the time. I thought they were crazy. They were just walking away from something so big and successful. We'd had great success around the world and I thought we were just breaking in a very, very big way. The collective dynamite of those four people, four people who could all write, who could all sing a hit song. In one band. (Yet) I think it becomes claustrophobic, in the fact that you're trying to perfect things and you're looking at each other and eventually you maybe say this relationship is a little too tight for me now, and I need to break away. And that's what in retrospect, I found out long after because I still speak to Godley and Creme who – Lol is my brother-in-law, so I've got to see him – but for quite a while we didn't talk. I just said you're out of your minds for leaving this band. We were on such a winning curve, Graham Gouldman and I had to decide, are we going to be 5cc? Are we gonna scrap the name completely? Well, we thought we, no, we'd better carry on because we, this is 10cc, we are 10cc, this band. Two of our members are leaving us and that's not our problem, but we've got to carry it on.

Stewart said that there were immediate benefits in the absence of Godley and Creme. "It became clear things went much smoother and the atmosphere was much more pleasant than with Lol and Kevin," he said.

Godley & Creme went on to achieve success as a songwriting and recording duo, scoring several hits and releasing a string of LPs and singles. Having honed their skills on the clips that they made to promote their own singles (e.g. their 1985 single "Cry") they returned to their visual arts roots and became directors of music videos in the 1980s, creating videos for acts including George Harrison ("When We Was Fab"), Asia ("Heat of the Moment", "Only Time Will Tell") The Police ("Every Breath You Take"), Duran Duran ("Girls on Film"), Frankie Goes to Hollywood ("Two Tribes"), Peter Gabriel's duet with Kate Bush ("Don't Give Up"), Yes’ “Leave It,”, Herbie Hancock ("Rockit"), and Stewart and Gouldman's "Feel the Love".

== 1977–1983: Second era ==
After the departure of Godley and Creme, Stewart and Gouldman continued as 10cc, working with drummer Paul Burgess, who up to that point had been their tour backup drummer. Their first album as a three-piece band was Deceptive Bends (1977), named after a sign on the Mickleham bends on the A24 between Leatherhead and Dorking in Surrey. The album, recorded at the newly completed Strawberry South Studio in Dorking, Surrey, reached No. 3 in Britain and No. 31 in the US and yielded three hit singles, "The Things We Do for Love" (UK No. 6, US No. 5), "Good Morning Judge" (UK No. 5, US No. 69) and "People in Love" (US No. 40). Stewart later said he and Gouldman felt vindicated by its success: "I was out to prove also that we could write a hit album without Kevin and Lol ... we did!"

In 1977, 10cc embarked on an international tour with guitarist Rick Fenn, keyboardist Tony O'Malley (Kokomo), and an additional drummer Stuart Tosh (ex-Pilot). This six-member 10cc recorded a live album, "Live and Let Live" (1977), which mixed the hits with material by Stewart and Gouldman from 10cc's career (alongside two songs written with Godley and Creme). Fenn, Tosh, Burgess and keyboardist Duncan Mackay, who replaced Tony O'Malley after the tour, were now full members of the band and performed on 1978's Bloody Tourists, which provided the band with their international No. 1 single, the reggae-styled "Dreadlock Holiday", which became their third UK No. 1. Both Bloody Tourists and "Dreadlock Holiday" were very successful around the world; however, additional songs released as singles became only minor hits, with the second UK single "Reds in My Bed", featuring lead vocals by Tosh, failing to chart.

The band suffered a major setback in January 1979 when Stewart was seriously injured in a car crash. Due to his injuries he was unable to work on music, and 10cc had to be put on hold. This led to the cancellation of part of a tour, and to other band members working on solo projects. Stewart later told the BBC:

It flattened me completely. I damaged my left ear, I damaged my eye very badly. I couldn't go near music. I couldn't go near anything loud and I love music and motor-racing. I had to stay away from both things for a long time, for about six months. And the momentum of this big machine that we'd had rolling slowed and slowed and slowed. And on the music scene, the punk thing had come in a big way. The Sex Pistols, The Clash, lots of things like that. So by the time I was fit again to play, I think we'd just missed the bus. It'd gone. And whatever we did after that, we got a few tickles here and there and we could continue touring forever on the strength of the past hits, but it didn't feel right again, we just didn't have that public with us.

Gouldman, too, considered the aftermath of Stewart's accident to be a turning point. In a 1995 BBC interview he said:

Really, after '78 things went downhill for us. I don't know what it was. We'd been doing it for so long, maybe we should have had a break then, rather than in '83 when we did have a break, or brought new blood in or done something. And even as the things were getting bad, we thought, 'Ah, it's gonna be all right, don't worry about it, it'll be great'.

While Stewart recovered, Gouldman recorded the title track to the film Sunburn with the help of some of the 10cc band members, which became a minor UK hit in 1979. Gouldman also recorded the soundtrack to the animated film Animalympics, which was originally intended as a 10cc project. Rick Fenn had great success touring with Mike Oldfield and recording with Nick Mason, after being introduced to them by Eric Stewart, while Duncan Mackay took part in recording of the Kate Bush album Never for Ever.

Filling the gap between 10cc releases, a greatest-hits compilation (Greatest Hits 1972–1978) was issued in late 1979, a single came out coupling "I'm Not in Love" with "For You and I", which failed to chart. As Stewart recovered, he recorded the soundtrack to the film Girls, mainly working with Duncan Mackay, with other 10cc band members making guest appearances. The band signed with Warner Bros. Records, producing a new 10cc offering entitled Look Hear? The lead single "One-Two-Five" failed to chart in their native UK, and the album proved to be less successful than previous 10cc albums. In the aftermath of the tour in support of it, Eric Stewart, Graham Gouldman and the rest of the band members again embarked on a number of side projects.

Gouldman and Stewart then decided to continue 10cc as a duo with other members becoming session and touring musicians. The band returned to the Mercury label to record Ten Out of 10 (1981) featuring Fenn and Burgess on a number of tracks. The UK release of the album (and its associated singles "Les Nouveaux Riches" and "Don't Turn Me Away") failed to chart. In a bid to inject an American flavour to the album and bolster its commercial appeal, Warner Bros. invited singer-songwriter Andrew Gold to contribute to a revised North American version of the LP. Gold wound up co-writing and playing on three new tracks which appeared on the North American release of Ten Out of 10. This ultimately led to an offer from Gouldman and Stewart to officially join 10cc, an offer that Gold declined because of other commitments. Gouldman later admitted greater involvement by Gold might have lifted the band's early 1980s output from its mediocrity:

We should either have tried to change direction, which we didn't, or got someone else in the band, which we almost did. The albums weren't really bad, there was always the integrity, and the production values, but in retrospect, I find them rather dour, rather lacklustre.

Though revisions were made to the album for the North American market, Ten Out of 10 did not chart in US, nor did any singles pulled from the LP. However, the single "Don't Turn Me Away" was a minor hit in Canada, reaching No. 38. Ironically, this track was one that appeared on the original "less commercial" UK version of the LP, and was not one of the tracks that had been specially added to the North American release.

The band embarked on their 10th anniversary tour in early 1982, with Fenn, Burgess and Tosh joining Stewart and Gouldman, along with new keyboardist Vic Emerson of Sad Café. They released "The Power of Love", co-written with Andrew Gold, as a single, which did not chart. "Run Away", released as a single in June 1982, reached No. 50 in the UK; "We've Heard it all Before" (October 1982) did not chart. All three of the singles were tracks from the revised North American version of Ten Out of 10, and had not previously been issued in the UK. Stewart also released a 1982 solo album, Frooty Rooties, with Burgess as a drummer and participation from Gouldman and Fenn on one track.

10cc began a UK tour in March 1983, coinciding with the release of the single "24 Hours". The song was made available both as a 7" and 10" single, with live versions of "Dreadlock Holiday" and "I'm Not in Love" on the B-sides. It failed to chart, as did a further single, "Feel The Love (Oomachasaooma)"/"She Gives Me Pain", issued in July 1983. "Feel The Love (Oomachasaooma)" was promoted by a tennis-themed video clip, directed by former 10cc members Godley and Creme, by now well into their joint careers as music video pioneers. The next 10cc LP, Windows in the Jungle (October 1983), used session heavyweights including drummer Steve Gadd, but the album was dominated by Stewart; Gouldman only performed partial lead vocals on one song. It reached No. 70 on the UK chart. The band toured the UK in October, with drummer Jamie Lane in place of Paul Burgess (who was working with Jethro Tull). This turned out to be their last tour until they reformed eight years later.

== 1984–1991: Separate projects ==
After 1983, the band went into recess as Stewart produced recordings for Sad Café and Gouldman produced tracks for the Ramones. Stewart continued his association with Paul McCartney; he had already appeared on Tug of War in 1982 and Pipes of Peace in 1983. During 1984, he appeared in the video for the US single "So Bad" which also featured Ringo Starr and the feature film/soundtrack for Give My Regards to Broad Street. He then co-wrote much of the Press to Play album (1986), though he was critical of the album's production. He also produced the album Eyes of a Woman (1985) by Agnetha Fältskog of ABBA.

Gouldman, meanwhile, teamed with Andrew Gold to form the duo Common Knowledge, which after two unsuccessful singles changed their name to Wax. The duo's albums included Magnetic Heaven (1986), American English (1987) and A Hundred Thousand in Fresh Notes (1989). The duo scored some success, including a Spanish No. 1 single and their only British hit, "Bridge to Your Heart" (1987), which reached No. 12. Gouldman also assembled and produced the charity single "You'll Never Walk Alone" by The Crowd in aid of the Bradford City stadium fire. Released in 1985, the single reached No. 1 on the UK chart. A compilation album, Changing Faces – The Very Best of 10cc and Godley & Creme, was released in 1987 and gave the band their biggest hit album since 1978. A four CD box set, Greatest Songs and More, was issued in Japan in 1991, which included many b-sides available on CD for the first time.

== 1991–1995: 10cc reunited ==
In 1991, the original four members reunited to record ...Meanwhile (1992), an album produced by Gary Katz of Steely Dan fame. Katz was suggested by the record label Polydor who wanted 10cc to enjoy success in America, and because of his links to Steely Dan—a similar-sounding 1970s band. All the album's songs were written by Stewart and Gouldman (with the exception of one track which was co-written by Stewart and Paul McCartney in the late 1980s with additional writing from Gouldman). Creme and Godley agreed to guest on the album to fulfil their obligation to Polydor—both had owed Polydor one album when they split in the late 1980s. Godley and Creme sang background vocals on several tracks on the album. Godley also sang the lead on one song, "The Stars Didn't Show".

...Meanwhile did not spawn any major hits, but was relatively well received in Japan and in Europe. It prominently featured session musicians Jeff Porcaro of Toto on drums, Freddie Washington on bass, Michael Landau on lead and rhythm guitar, and Bashiri Johnson on percussion. Also appearing on the album were Dr. John (Mac Rebennack) on piano, David Paich (also of Toto fame) on keyboards, longtime 10cc collaborator Andrew Gold on guitar and many other renowned session musicians and singers. ...Meanwhile is believed to be Porcaro's last session work before he died of a heart attack. Dr. John was recommended by producer Gary Katz and invited along to the sessions.

Gouldman, in a 1995 interview conducted by Justin Hayward on BBC Radio 2, was philosophical about the album: "When we finally did come back to record again, it was based on market research that our record company had done, that said a new 10cc album would do really, really well. And, ah, history has proved that wrong." Yet according to Stewart, both he and Gouldman had approached the album positively. "We wrote in a three-month period, 22 songs. Every day we were coming up with new ideas, and they were getting better and better, as far as we were concerned. And they sounded like 10cc songs again."

A tour in 1993 followed the album, with former members Rick Fenn and Stuart Tosh returning alongside new players Steve Piggot (keyboards, synthesisers) and Gary Wallis (drum, percussion). This tour was captured on the live album and DVD Alive.

In 1995, the band released Mirror Mirror, produced by Gouldman, Stewart and Adrian Lee of Mike + The Mechanics, and without participation from Godley or Creme. Despite initial objections by Gouldman, Mirror Mirror included an acoustic version of "I'm Not in Love" which became a No. 29 UK hit single, but overall the album did not fare very well. Gouldman has described Mirror Mirror as "almost like two-halves of an album", largely a result of the fact that he and Stewart recorded in separate countries. "I don't like to say we hoodwinked the people, but you could say it's not quite what it appears to be, and anyone with any sense, who reads the credits, could see that," he told Goldmine magazine. Their recording arrangement also provided further evidence of a fractured relationship between Stewart and Gouldman: aside from "I'm Not in Love", Stewart did not appear on any of the tracks Gouldman played or sang on, while Gouldman did not appear on any of Stewart's tracks. In the spring of 1995, the band toured Europe and Japan with a line-up of Stewart, Gouldman, Fenn, Tosh, Alan Park (keyboards, synthesisers) and Geoff Dunn (drums, percussion).

Stewart left the band after this tour, and has since commented: "10cc is well and truly finished as far as I am concerned." Married to a pair of sisters, Stewart and Creme have kept in touch.

== 1999–present: 10cc touring band, GG/06 ==
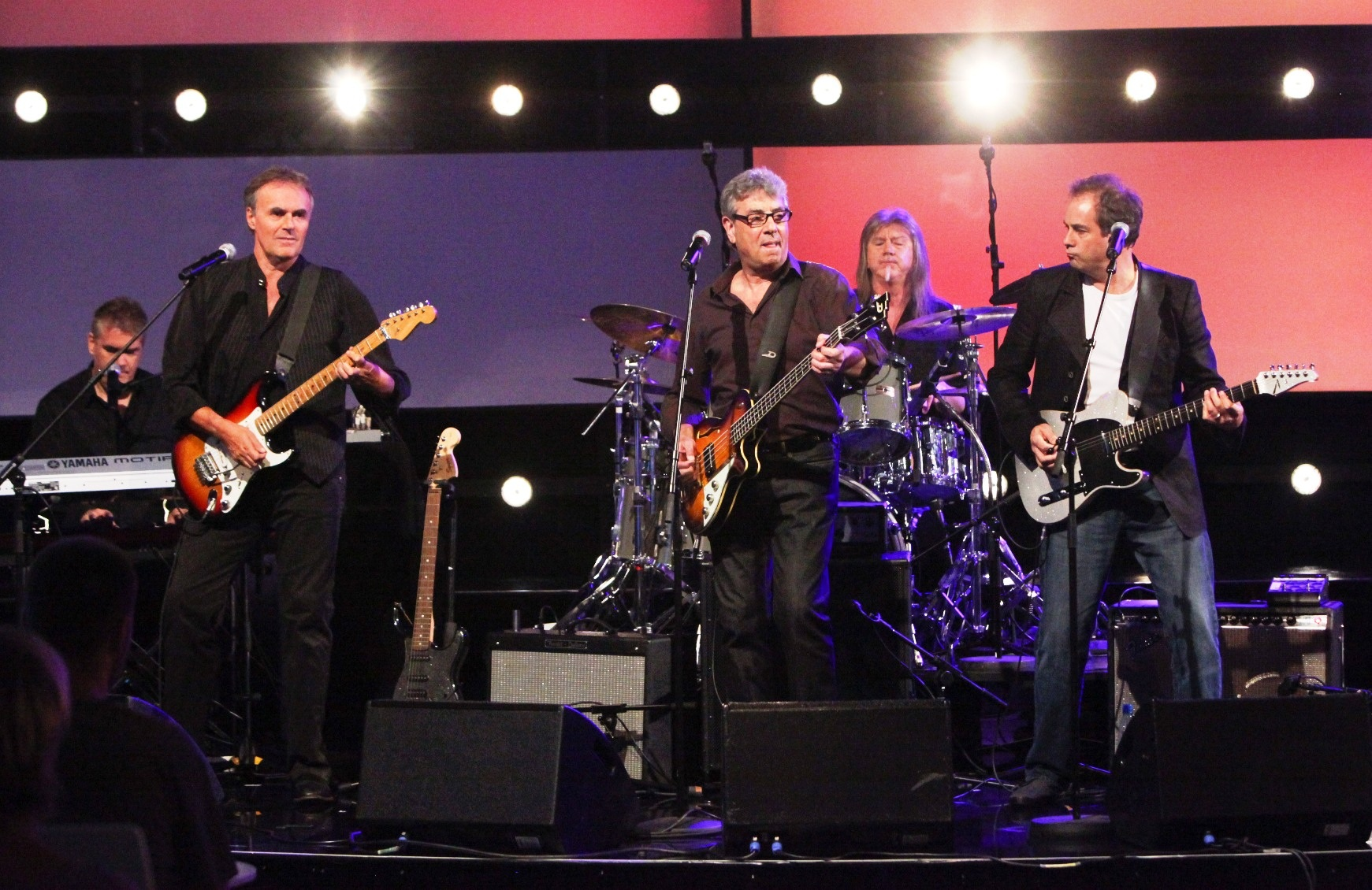
10cc on the Swedish show on Bingolotto on TV4, September 2010

In 1999, Gouldman convened a 10cc line-up consisting of himself, Fenn, Paul Burgess, and new recruits Mick Wilson (vocals, guitar) and Mike Stevens (vocals, keyboards, sax, guitar). This version of the band played their first gig at Ronnie Scott's Jazz Club in Birmingham and then began touring regularly in 2002. This iteration of the group toured both the UK and overseas, playing 10cc hits plus a section of songs from Gouldman's songwriting career Wax. Wilson handled the majority of the lead vocals, taking over from Eric Stewart on that front. Founding guitarist Lol Creme, discussing his newest live act in 2012, opined:

I understand Graham's need and want to go on the road and tour but maybe he could call the show, 'Graham Gouldman of 10cc' instead of just 10cc. I feel that as things are, the name is quite misleading to the fans. I know that Eric still gets emails from fans who were disappointed that he wasn't at these "10cc" shows. It really gets under his skin. I've still got a lot of respect for Graham and he was certainly an integral part of 10cc."

— Lol Creme

In January 2004, Godley and Gouldman reconvened to write more songs. The band started offering the new songs through their website in 2006 and eventually released the EP GG/06: EP – 1. A few of the songs were added to the 10cc live set, while the song "Son of Man" later became the opening theme for 10cc shows with Godley providing the video. Kevin Godley also joined 10cc live on several occasions.

A new 10cc touring member, Keith Hayman (keyboards), switched with Mike Stevens in 2006 and continued to do so until 2011. The band released a live album and DVD titled Clever Clogs in 2008 featuring Kevin Godley on several songs, including GG/06's "BeautifulLoser.com". In early 2009, Gouldman's 10cc launched its website, 10ccworld.com (now 10cc.world). Since the release, the website offered various live recordings of the shows through its online store. Regarding new 10cc studio releases, Gouldman has said that without Stewart, Creme or Godley, there will never be another 10cc album, though he is happy to play past albums in concert. Celebrating the 40th anniversary of the band's formation, 10cc performed a concert at the Royal Albert Hall on 10 May 2012 with Kevin Godley performing several songs with the band. Universal Music also issued two box sets for this occasion. The first one titled Tenology, a four-CD/one-DVD retrospective, was released on 19 November 2012. All four original members helped choose the track listing and gave interviews to Paul Lester as part of the project. The second box set titled Classic Album Selection featured albums from The Original Soundtrack to Live and Let Live along with bonus tracks.

In December 2015, BBC Four released the hour-long documentary titled I'm Not in Love: The Story of 10cc. In 2016 Godley recorded a video performance of "Somewhere in Hollywood" for 10cc's live performance of the album Sheet Music during that year. The same year, Keith Hayman again replaced Mike Stevens on keyboards.

In July 2017, a box set titled Before, During and After: The Story of 10cc was released. The four-disc set contains 10cc material as well as material from the late 1960s and early 1970s that the band recorded under various names and material from various projects that band members were involved in after leaving the band. Eric Stewart also released a solo boxset through Cherry Records while promoting his autobiography. In late 2017, the 10cc concert line-up changed with Iain Hornal taking Wilson's place permanently as vocalist, after filling in regularly since 2013. And Paul Canning subbed for Hornal briefly during 2018, then once again in November of 2023. In 2020–2021, guitarist Nick Kendall subbed for Rick Fenn. On 19 July 2023 Graham and the group appeared on This Morning, a UK breakfast TV show, performing "The Things We Do for Love", with Nick Kendall once again standing in for Rick Fenn. Keyboardist Ciaran Jeremiah accompanied the group on a November 2023 European tour filling in for Keith Hayman, who was touring with Cliff Richard.

On March 11, 2024, the band announced their first North American tour in forty six years, The Ultimate, Ultimate Greatest Hits Tour, due to commence on July 24, 2024, at the Wellmont Theater in Montclair, New Jersey. Andy Park (vocals, guitars, bass, percussion, mandolin, keyboards) was brought in to sub for Iain Hornal, who was out performing with Jeff Lynne's ELO.

In 2025, Kevin Godley reunited with Graham Gouldman for a special performance as 10cc for an edition of BBC Radio 2's Piano Room with the BBC Concert Orchestra conducted by Anne Dudley. Three songs were performed including "I'm Not in Love", new composition "I Don't Want to Go to Heaven", and a cover version of "All I Have to Do Is Dream". Gouldman has suggested that he might work with Godley again, but discounts a reunion with Stewart as the pair have not met up "in decades." Godley and Gouldman confirmed that neither have kept in touch with Creme.

Later that year, Paul Burgess announced his retirement from the band and was replaced by a new drummer, Ben Stone.

On July 2nd, the record label Breaking Wave announced that it had signed 10cc to release a new album later in 2026.

== Personnel ==
Current members

- Graham Gouldman – bass guitar, lead and backing vocals, rhythm guitar, percussion (1972–1983, 1991–1995, 1999–present)
- Rick Fenn – lead guitar, backing and lead vocals, bass guitar, keyboards (1976–1983, 1993–1995, 1999–present)
- Keith Hayman – keyboards, bass guitar, rhythm guitar, backing vocals (2006–2011, 2016–present)
- Iain Hornal – lead and backing vocals, guitar, percussion, keyboards, mandolin (2017–present; substitute 2014–2017)
- Ben Stone – drums, percussion (2025–present)

== Discography ==
- 10cc (1973)
- Sheet Music (1974)
- The Original Soundtrack (1975)
- How Dare You! (1976)
- Deceptive Bends (1977)
- Bloody Tourists (1978)
- Look Hear? (1980)
- Ten Out of 10 (1981)
- Windows in the Jungle (1983)
- ...Meanwhile (1992)
- Mirror Mirror (1995)

== Filmography ==
Concert films

- Ultimate Greatest Hits Tour (2022) – Recorded at the New Theatre Oxford on 27 October 2022, the Ultimate Greatest Hits Tour concert film was released as a live concert stream on 1 December 2022.
