= Deceptive Bends =

Studio album by 10cc
- Released: May 1977
- Recorded: October 1976 – March 1977
- Studios: Strawberry Studios South (Dorking, Surrey)
- Genres: Progressive pop; pop rock; art pop
- Length: 39:32
- Label: Mercury
- Producer: 10cc

10cc chronology
How Dare You! (1976)	Deceptive Bends (1977)	Live and Let Live (1977)

Singles from Deceptive Bends
- 1. "The Things We Do for Love" Released: December 1976; 2. "Good Morning Judge" Released: April 1977 (UK); 3. "People in Love" Released: May 1977 (US)

Professional ratings
Review scores
Source	Rating
AllMusic	4/5 stars
The Rolling Stone Album Guide	2/5 stars
Uncut	4/5 stars

Deceptive Bends is the fifth studio album by the English rock band 10cc, released in May 1977 by Mercury Records. It was the first album released by the band after the departure of founding members Kevin Godley and Lol Creme and produced the hit singles "The Things We Do for Love" and "Good Morning Judge" .

== History ==
The band started recording sessions for the fifth album in late summer of 1976 with the song "People in Love", at that time referred to as "Voodoo Boogie". But with the tensions in the band rising the track was considered "awful" when assembled, and Kevin Godley and Lol Creme decided to temporarily split with Eric Stewart and Graham Gouldman to start work on what would later become their debut project Consequences. As their work progressed Godley and Creme decided to leave the group.

As Stewart and Gouldman were left as a duo they opted to try recording "Good Morning Judge", which debuted live at the Knebworth Festival on 21 August 1976 with the original line-up, and later "The Things We Do For Love". Satisfied with the results they continued to run the band with the assistance of drummer Paul Burgess, who had already worked with 10cc, acting as second drummer to Kevin Godley on tour.

Stewart recalled: "I had a big challenge ahead of me to prove to the record world that we were not just 5cc, as some of the British media had graciously called us. The music was simpler than some of the previous 10cc albums, it was far more direct, streamlined and positive. The whole album was recorded very (in our terms) quickly. I was on a mission, and flying higher and faster than I had ever been before, and I knew by then that we had a very strong album. The new songs played a big part in the equation of course, I was out to prove also that we could write a hit album without Kevin and Lol ... we did!"

The album was the first by 10cc to be recorded in the newly built Strawberry Studios South, though the original recording attempts with Godley and Creme were made in the original Strawberry Studios now referred as North.

== Cover and title ==
The cover design was provided by Hipgnosis. The title of the album was taken from a sign warning of dangerous curves in the southbound A24 between Leatherhead and Dorking in Surrey. Gouldman said in 1977: "Every day I used to travel down from London and see the sign, 'Deceptive Bends.' It struck me to be quite a subtle word the Department of Transport was using, and Eric agreed it was a nice title." The sign is no longer there.

== Release ==
The first single taken from the album, "The Things We Do for Love", reached No. 1 in Canada, No. 6 in the UK singles chart, No. 5 on the Billboard Hot 100 where it was later certified Gold and became the band's best selling single there.

Deceptive Bends itself was also a success, performing better than previous 10cc albums in a number of countries.

The album was reissued and remastered on CD in 1997 with B-sides as bonus tracks.

An early "Voodoo Boogie" version of "People in Love" that featured a more offbeat arrangement and prominent backing vocals by Creme, was later included in 10cc's limited-edition box set Tenology in 2012.

== Track listing ==
All tracks written by Eric Stewart and Graham Gouldman.

=== Side one ===
No.	Title	Lead vocals	Length
1.	"Good Morning Judge"	Stewart	2:55
2.	"The Things We Do for Love"	Stewart	3:27
3.	"Marriage Bureau Rendezvous"	Gouldman	4:04
4.	"People in Love"	Stewart	3:48
5.	"Modern Man Blues"	Gouldman and Stewart	5:35

=== Side two ===
No.	Title	Lead vocals	Length
6.	"Honeymoon with B Troop"	Gouldman and Stewart	2:46
7.	"I Bought a Flat Guitar Tutor"	Stewart	1:48
8.	"You've Got a Cold"	Stewart	3:36
9.	"Feel the Benefit; I: "Reminisce and Speculate"; II: "A Latin Break"; III: "Feel the Benefit""	Stewart and Gouldman	11:32

=== Bonus tracks on 1997 CD reissue ===
No.	Title	Lead vocals	Length
10.	"Hot to Trot"	Gouldman	4:30
11.	"Don't Squeeze Me Like Toothpaste"	Stewart	3:39
12.	"I'm So Laid Back, I'm Laid Out"	Gouldman	3:46

== Personnel ==
Credits sourced from the original album liner notes.

=== 10cc ===
- Eric Stewart – lead (1, 2, 4, 5, 7–9), co-lead (6) and backing vocals (1–3, 5, 6, 8, 9), electric lead (all tracks) and rhythm guitars (3, 9), slide guitar (1, 3–5), piano (1, 2, 4–6, 8, 9), Fender Rhodes electric piano (3, 6, 9), organ (2, 3, 6), Moog synthesizer (1, 9), maracas (8, 9)
- Graham Gouldman – lead (3, 5, 6, 9) and backing vocals (all tracks), bass guitar (all tracks), fuzz bass (7, 8), electric lead (1, 9) and rhythm guitars (all tracks), 12-string acoustic guitar (9), acoustic guitar (2–4, 9), organ and dobro (5), autoharp (9), tambourine (1, 2), handclaps (2), triangle (6), guiro (8)
- Paul Burgess – drums (all tracks), tambourine (1, 2, 4, 9), cabasa (1, 6, 9), "wah" piano (1), gong and handclaps (2), congas (3, 9), triangle and piano stool (3), bell-tree and roto-toms (4), wood blocks and vibraphone (6), agogô (8), claves (9)

=== Additional musicians ===
- Del Newman – string arrangements (4, 9)
- Jean Alain Roussel – Fender Rhodes electric piano and organ (8)
- Tony Spath – piano (7), oboe (5)

== Charts performance ==
=== Weekly charts ===
Chart (1977)	Peak position
Australia (Kent Music Report)	8
Canada Top Albums/CDs (RPM)	78
Finnish Albums (Suomen virallinen lista)	28
Dutch Albums (Album Top 100)	4
New Zealand Albums (RMNZ)	4
Norwegian Albums (VG-lista)	4
Swedish Albums (Sverigetopplistan)	4
UK Albums (Official Charts)	3
US Billboard 200	31

=== Year-end charts ===
Chart (1977)	Rank
Australia (Kent Music Report)	9
Dutch Albums (MegaCharts)	37
New Zealand Albums (RMNZ)	36
UK Albums (OCC)	35

=== Certifications ===
Region	Certification	Certified units/sales
Australia (ARIA)	Gold	20,000^{^}
United Kingdom (BPI)	Gold	100,000^{^}
Canada (Music Canada)	Gold	50,000^{^}
^{^} Shipments figures based on certification alone.
