= I'm Mandy Fly Me =

Single by 10cc

from the album How Dare You!
- B-side: "How Dare You"
- Released: March 1976
- Genre: Progressive pop; art pop; pop rock; art rock
- Length: 4:41 (single version); 5:21 (album version)
- Label: Mercury
- Songwriters: Eric Stewart; Graham Gouldman; Kevin Godley
- Producer: 10cc

10cc singles chronology
"Art for Art's Sake" (1975)	"I'm Mandy Fly Me" (1976)	"The Things We Do for Love" (1976)

"I'm Mandy Fly Me" is a single by 10cc released in 1976. It was taken from the How Dare You! album, and reached No. 6 on the UK Singles Chart.

== Writing and recording ==
The album version of "I'm Mandy Fly Me" features an intro in the form of one of the bridge sections of the band's 1974 song "Clockwork Creep". The section, whose lyrics are "Oh, no you'll never get me up in one of these again / 'Cause what goes up must come down", is rendered soft and tinny, as if heard playing from a portable transistor radio or an in-flight audio system.

In a radio interview, songwriter Eric Stewart recalled the origins of the song:

National Airlines used to have this beautiful poster that they displayed of this gorgeous stewardess inviting you onto the plane. Now her name wasn't Mandy actually, it was something like, er, oh gosh knows, "I'm Cindy", a very American name. "I'm Cindy, fly me" which was a quite sexual connotation as well, but I remember seeing in Manchester this beautiful poster and just below it was this tramp, I mean a serious tramp, quite a raggedy guy, looking up at this girl, and I thought God, do you know, there's a song there. Look at that guy looking up at Cindy-fly-me and I know he's never gonna get on an aeroplane, I don't think, except in his dreams.

He continued:

[So I brought it back, the idea back to the studio, where we were writing for the How Dare You! album, and put it to the guys: "Anybody interested in this 'I'm Mandy Fly Me'". I'd switched it to Mandy. And Graham said "yeah, that sounds like a good idea. I've got some ideas, I've got some chords. Let's slot those things in, try it, mess it around". We wrote it, and we didn't like it. We, we scrapped it. It just wasn't going anywhere. But, enter from stage left, ha ha, the "wicked villain" Kevin Godley, twiddling his moustache, says "I know what's wrong with it. Let's sit down again." He said "I think it just gets too bland, it just goes on, on one plane, your verses and your middles and your der-der-der, they're all going on the one plane. What it needs is someone to go 'Bash' on the side of your head". So we changed the rhythm completely, and we put two whacking great guitar solos in there, in the middle of this quiet, soft, floaty song. Once we'd got that idea in, it, it just gelled into something else. Again, impossible to dance to, as a lot of 10cc tracks were, but once Kevin had put that in, he became the third writer in the song so we were quite democratic in that way.

Record World said that it has "shifting harmonies and twisting time signatures."

== Personnel ==
- Eric Stewart – lead vocal, electric piano, grand piano, lead guitar (second solo), whistle, backing vocals
- Graham Gouldman – bass guitar, double bass, six string bass, acoustic guitar, zither, backing vocals
- Lol Creme – acoustic guitar, lead guitar (first solo), Moog synthesizer, vibraphone, backing vocals
- Kevin Godley – drums, backing vocals

== Chart performance ==
Chart (1976)	Peak position
Australia (Kent Music Report)	62
Ireland (IRMA)	3
Netherlands (Single Top 100)	50
New Zealand (Recorded Music NZ)	25
Sweden (Sverigetopplistan)	18
UK Singles (OCC)	6
US Billboard Hot 100	60
