= Paul Burgess (musician) =

English musical artist (born 1950)

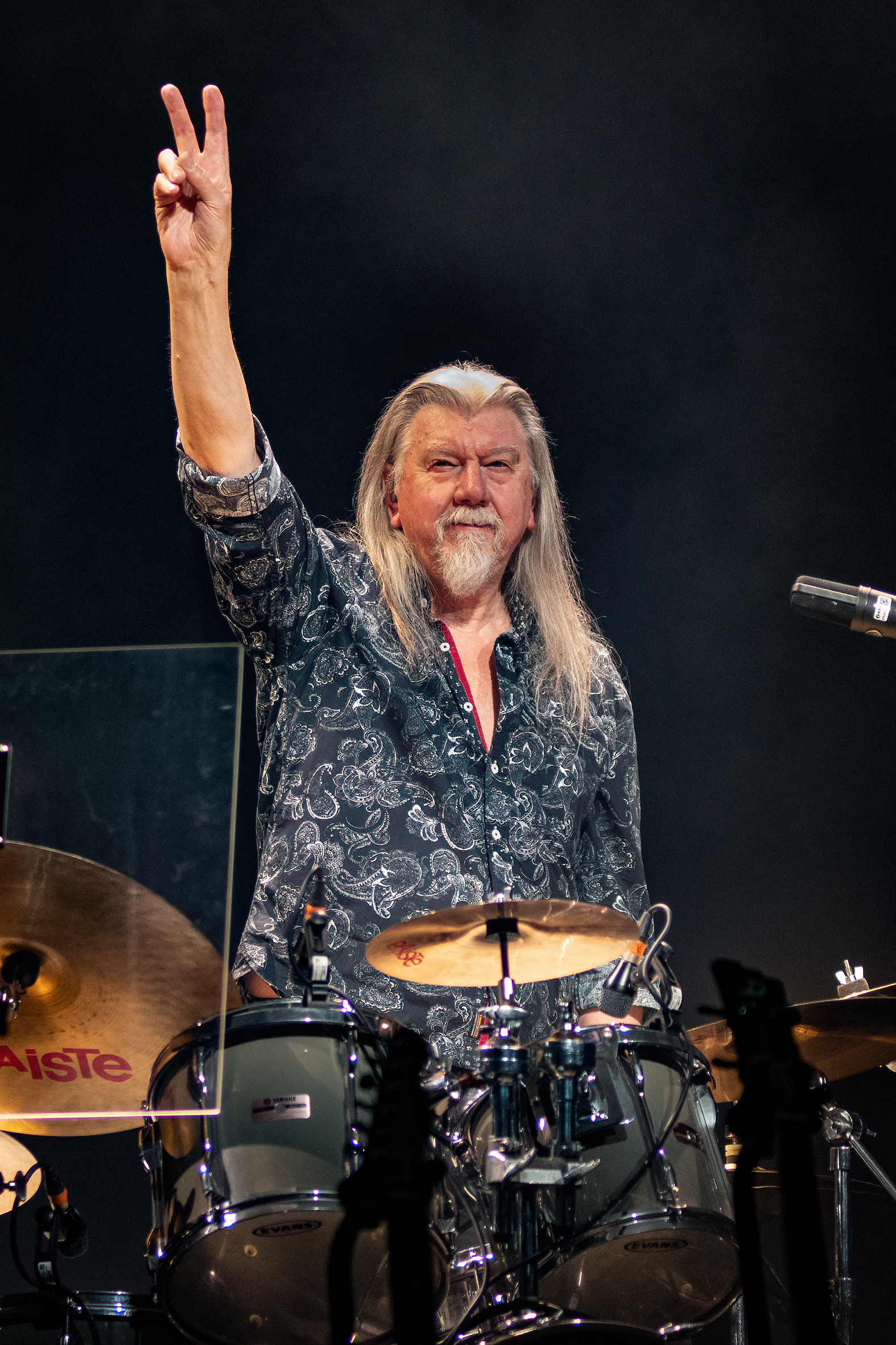
- Burgess performing with 10cc in 2021

Background information
- Born: 28 September 1950 (age 75); Manchester, England
- Genres: Rock
- Occupations: Musician
- Instruments: Drums; percussion; piano
- Years active: 1965–present
- Formerly of: 10cc; Jethro Tull; Camel; Magna Carta; The Icicle Works; Gloria Gaynor; Sad Cafe

Paul Burgess (born 28 September 1950) is an English rock drummer, notable for his association with a wide range of British rock bands. In addition to extensive session work, he has been a member of 10cc, Jethro Tull, Camel, Magna Carta, and The Icicle Works.

== Career ==
Burgess was born in Manchester, England. He started playing drums in 1965 and played in 60s Stockport four piece band Axis, which he left in July 1971. He then joined 10cc on their 1973 UK tour and subsequently played with the band on most of their tours until 1983.

He played on the 10cc Live: King Biscuit Flower Hour album recorded in 1975 and officially joined 10cc as drummer, percussionist and occasional keyboardist in 1976 after the departure of Kevin Godley and Lol Creme. His first studio album with the band was Deceptive Bends, which featured the hits "The Things We Do for Love", "Good Morning Judge" and "People in Love". During the 1977 10cc tour Burgess was joined on drums by Stuart Tosh. Burgess continued his association with 10cc on their albums Bloody Tourists (1978), Look Hear? (1980) and Ten Out of 10 (1981). Paul also played drums on Graham Gouldman's Animalympics (1980) soundtrack and Eric Stewart's first two solo albums; the soundtrack to the French film Girls (1980) and Frooty Rooties (1982).

Burgess subsequently became a member of The Invisible Girls, a band that backed punk-influenced performance poet John Cooper Clarke on several of his late 70s/early 80s recordings. Burgess temporarily left the band in 1980 and was replaced by Buzzcocks drummer John Maher for the album Pauline Murray and The Invisible Girls, on which the band backed ex-punk singer Pauline Murray.

He was also a member of folk-rock outfit Magna Carta for one album, 1981's Midnight Blue. After the release of this album, Magna Carta broke up for several years.

The following year 1982, Burgess was briefly a member of Jethro Tull, replacing Gerry Conway, and touring throughout Europe and North America with the band. He was the drummer on the London Symphony Orchestra's album A Classic Case, which also included the rest of the current Jethro Tull members. Burgess was replaced by Doane Perry in 1984.

Burgess rejoined 10cc for their 1983 tour, after which 10cc broke up.

In 1984, Burgess became a member of progressive rock unit Camel, replacing Stuart Tosh, who had also been a member of 10cc. He stayed for one studio album (Stationary Traveller), and one live album (Pressure Points: Live in Concert) before the band dissolved in 1985.

Around the same time, Burgess was the session drummer (though not an official band member) for pop band The Colourfield, playing drums on virtually all the tracks on their 1985 debut LP, Virgins & Philistines.

In 1986, he toured with Joan Armatrading and returned as a member of the reformed Magna Carta. During the late 1980s, Burgess also did extensive live work with a range of artists including glam-rocker/rockabilly revivalist Alvin Stardust and disco singer Gloria Gaynor.

In 1990, Burgess replaced drummer Zak Starkey in a late-running version of the new-wave rock band The Icicle Works. He recorded one album, 1990s Permanent Damage, before the group broke up.

In 1992, Camel reformed with Burgess on drums. He stayed until 1993, recording a studio album Dust and Dreams (1991) and a live album Never Let Go (1992) with the band. Around the same time, Burgess worked on the debut album from Jynine James, which also featured Peter Frampton on lead guitar.

Burgess then joined Chris Farlowe's R&B styled backing band in 1995 and worked with Farlowe steadily for the next decade. In 2000, Burgess once again re-joined 10cc for a series of live shows.

In 2003, in addition to semi-regular gigs with Farlow and 10cc, Paul Burgess played drums with The Soul Company (a band headed by Dave Sharp, formerly of The Alarm), as well as Then Came The Wheel, a band consisting of several veterans of the UK folk rock scene. During the mid-2000s Burgess also began playing and touring with the Stockport-based band, The Removal Men. More recently he has been working and performing as a member of English band Katy Lied, whose album, Late Arrival was released in 2008.

In 2013, Burgess joined the Midnite Johnny Band.

In 2017, Burgess joined with bassist Rick Kemp and guitarist Ken Nicol to form the 'supergroup' trio, 'Burgess, Nicol and Kemp'.

In 2018, Burgess worked with The Pipe Brothers Project, featuring Andrew and Jamie Pipe from rock band The Mentulls on two singles 'Sonic Journey' and 'Heart & Soul'.

In 2022, Burgess joined singer-songwriter Clive Gregson, Neil Cossar (The Cheaters) and bassist-singer Craig Fletcher and Keyboardist Jez Smith from Barclay James Harvest to form The Guilty Men.

In 2025, Burgess announced his retirement from 10cc and was replaced by Ben Stone.
