= Strawberry Studios =

Former recording studio in Stockport, England

Coordinates: 53°24′25″N 2°09′16″W

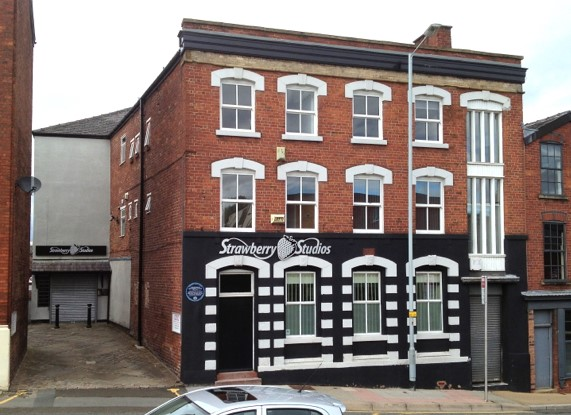
- The former Strawberry Studios building in 2013
- Formerly: Inter-City Studios
- Type: Recording studio
- Industry: Music
- Founded: 1968; 58 years ago
- Founder: Peter Tattersall; Eric Stewart
- Headquarters: Stockport, Cheshire (now in Greater Manchester), England
- Website: strawberrynorth.co.uk

Strawberry Studios was a recording studio in Stockport, historically in Cheshire, now within Greater Manchester, England. Founded in 1968, it operated until the early 1990s. Strawberry Studios was used by a range of artists including the Ramones, 10cc, Joy Division, Neil Sedaka, Barclay James Harvest, the Smiths, the Stone Roses, the Moody Blues, the Beatles' Paul McCartney, Wax and Cliff Richard.

== Formation ==
The facility was originally called Inter-City Studios and located above a music store in the town centre. In early 1968 it was bought by Peter Tattersall, a former road manager for Billy J. Kramer and the Dakotas. Tattersall invited Eric Stewart, then lead guitarist and singer of the Mindbenders and later a member of 10cc, to join him as a partner in July 1968. The pair moved to larger premises at No. 3 Waterloo Road in October, with Stewart choosing the studio's new name in honour of his favourite song by the Beatles, "Strawberry Fields Forever".

Within months songwriter and future 10cc member Graham Gouldman joined the pair as an investor. The studio was used extensively by Stewart, Gouldman and the other two musicians who would join them to form 10cc, Lol Creme and Kevin Godley.

In a 1976 interview, Stewart described the studio's early days:

"It was a very tiny studio with some stereo equipment and the walls lined with egg boxes to provide sound insulation. There was a makeshift sort of control desk tied together with sellotape and string, but it was good enough for what I wanted to do, and it was the only studio near Manchester. What I wanted to do was to make some demos of some songs I'd written – put them down myself and then try to sell them. At that time I was infected with the idea of becoming a recording engineer and building a studio where I could develop my own ideas as to what a studio should be like."

Gouldman was equally enthusiastic:

"Ever since I'd started songwriting I'd always wanted to have a studio of my own to work in and to make my own demos. We used to tell ourselves that one day the Beatles would record there – and eventually Paul McCartney did. Gradually the studio did get a name for being a good place to work."

== First recordings ==
The partners in the business continued to upgrade equipment at the studios, and in December 1969 a deal was struck with US producers Jerry Kasenetz and Jeffry Katz of Super K Productions to book the studios solidly for three months to record bubblegum songs, using the talents of Gouldman, Stewart, Godley and Creme.

Stewart described the Kasenetz-Katz deal as a breakthrough: "That allowed us to get the extra equipment to turn it into a real studio. To begin with they were interested in Graham's songwriting and when they heard that he was involved in a studio I think they thought the most economical thing for them to do would be to book his studio and then put him to work there – but they ended up recording Graham's songs and then some of Kevin and Lol's songs, and we were all working together."

When new recording equipment was installed in June 1970, the first experiments with it, on the layering of drum sounds, yielded the hit single "Neanderthal Man", released under the name of Hotlegs.

Stewart said: "It was the first thing we had ever tried to record on the new equipment that we'd had installed at the studio with the Kasenetz Katz money; for the first time we'd become a 16-track studio with our own Ampex 16-track machine and a real purpose-built control desk. We were all very excited about it and 'Neanderthal Man' was something we recorded to test the equipment."

Another song recorded soon after, "Umbopo", released under the name of Doctor Father, became pivotal in the eventual decision by the four musicians to record as a band. When Gouldman was introduced to American singer-songwriter Neil Sedaka in New York, Sedaka exclaimed: "I just love your 'Umbopo'." Gouldman told Sedaka the song had been recorded at Strawberry and Sedaka asked if he could use the studio for his next album. Sedaka recorded two studio albums there – Solitaire (recorded in February and March 1972) and The Tra-La Days Are Over (1973). Harvey Lisberg also brought them Ramases who recorded his Space Hymns album (1971) there. Manchester folk group Fivepenny Piece also recorded many of their albums at the studios.

== 10cc home studio ==
The experience of working on Solitaire, which became a success for Sedaka, was enough to prompt the band to seek recognition on their own merits. In a later interview Gouldman said: "It was Neil Sedaka's success that did it, I think. We'd just been accepting any job we were offered and were getting really frustrated. We knew that we were worth more than that, but it needed something to prod us into facing that. We were a bit choked to think that we'd done the whole of Neil's first album with him just for flat session fees when we could have been recording our own material."

Once launched as a band, 10cc recorded their first four studio albums at Strawberry Studios. Sheet Music (1974) was recorded at the same time McCartney was producing brother Mike McGear's album McGear. Gouldman recalled: "We would work in the studios every day from 11am to 5pm and then Paul would come in the evenings. It was a fabulous period, the studio looked absolutely beautiful, full of their equipment and our equipment, there was a lovely creative atmosphere in the studio ... Throughout that period Strawberry was operating 24 hours a day and that gave the studio an atmosphere it had never had before and to me that's something that came across on Sheet Music that we did not capture again when we did The Original Soundtrack."

== Strawberry Studios South and Strawberry Mastering ==
In 1976, Gouldman and Stewart opened a second studio, Strawberry Studios South, in a former cinema in Dorking, Surrey, following the departure of Godley and Creme. The studio had been planned before the band's split, with Stewart pointing out the Stockport studio had been in such great demand it was often difficult for 10cc to use it. He said: "Initially the studio will be just for 10cc, but we will be letting it out for block bookings of two months at a time for selected customers, other groups who want to record in comfort." The original Strawberry Studio was then referred to as Strawberry Studios North.

The first 10cc album to be recorded there was their fifth, Deceptive Bends (1977), and the band continued to record the subsequent albums there. The band returned to Strawberry Studios North to record their ninth album, Windows in the Jungle (1983).

In 1978, Strawberry Mastering opened in London, which for the first time gave the studio complete control of the process from recording to pressing.

== Sale and closure ==
10cc sold their interest in the Stockport studio in the 1980s. In 1986, the neighbouring Yello 2 recording studio took over the running of Strawberry in Stockport. It ceased operation as a music studio in the early 1990s and was converted for use for film and video production.

Both Strawberry Mastering and Strawberry South had closed by 1993.

== Legacy ==
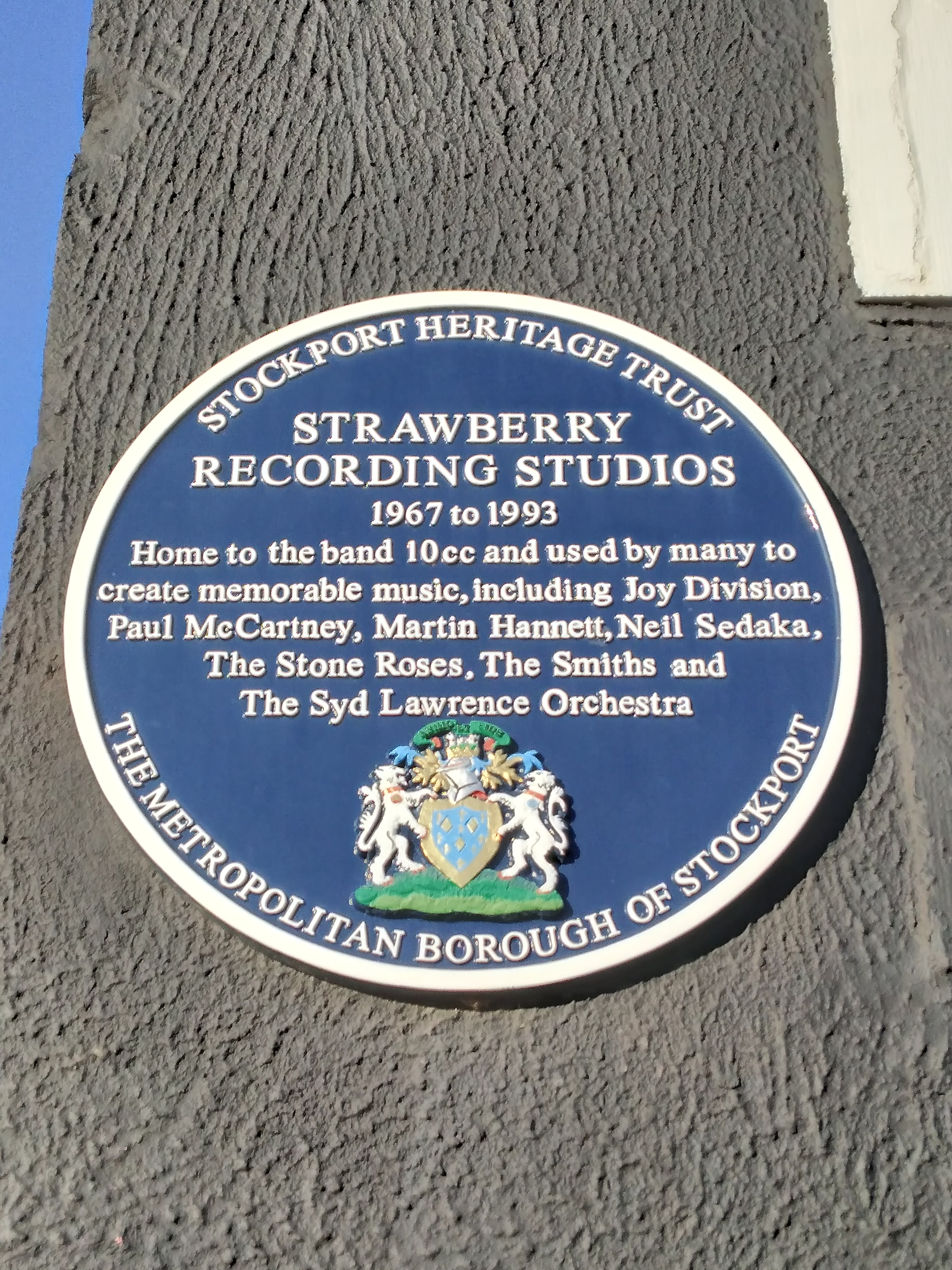
The blue plaque mounted by the Stockport Heritage Trust in 2007

The major artists that recorded in the studios, both North and South, included Joy Division, Neil Sedaka, Barclay James Harvest, the Smiths, the Stone Roses, the Moody Blues, Paul McCartney, Wax, Phil Collins, and Cliff Richard.

On 3 May 2007, a blue plaque was mounted on the front of 3 Waterloo Road by the Borough of Stockport for the Stockport Heritage Trust marking the building as one of notable historical interest. The plaque reads: "Strawberry Recording Studios 1967 to 1993. Home to the band 10cc and used by many to create memorable music including Joy Division, Paul McCartney, Martin Hannett, Neil Sedaka, the Stone Roses, the Smiths, and the Syd Lawrence Orchestra."

On 26 January 2017, the Stockport Museum commenced a full exhibit of equipment and associated artworks connected with the studio.

In September 2017, Chris Hewitt of CH Vintage Audio, and Peter Wadsworth and a team of volunteers, rebuilt the Strawberry Studios control room as it was in the late 1970s in the original building. Over 1,200 visitors came in to the original building over two weekends in September and October.
