= Changing Faces – The Very Best of 10cc and Godley & Creme =

Greatest hits album by 10cc
- Released: August 1987
- Genre: Rock
- Label: PolygramTV
- Producer: 10cc, Trevor Horn

10cc chronology
Windows in the Jungle (1983)	Changing Faces – The Very Best of 10cc and Godley & Creme (1987)	...Meanwhile (1992)

Singles from Changing Faces
- 1. "Snack Attack (Remix)" b/w "Wet Rubber Soup (Edit)" Released: June 1987

Professional ratings
Review scores
Source	Rating
AllMusic	4/5 stars

Changing Faces – The Very Best of 10cc and Godley & Creme is a compilation album that included the hits of 10cc and Godley & Creme, the first album to include both bands.

== Release and reception ==
The album featured 16 tracks including a newly remixed version of "Snack Attack" by Godley & Creme, that originally featured on their 1981 album Ismism. The track was also issued as a single with an edit of "Wet Rubber Soup" from The History Mix Volume 1 (1985) on the B-side. The single failed to chart.

The album was very successful in the UK reaching No.4 and achieving platinum status for selling over 300,000 copies. It was also the catalyst to Polydor conducting market research to see if the public would welcome a new album from the band which eventually resulted in ...Meanwhile (1992).

== The cover ==
The cover featured a composite of all the band's faces placed on top of each other - a reference to the famous morphing video for Godley & Creme's "Cry" single from 1985.

== Track listing ==
1. 10cc "Dreadlock Holiday" (Eric Stewart, Graham Gouldman) 1978
2. 10cc "The Wall Street Shuffle" (Stewart, Gouldman) 1974
3. Godley & Creme "Under Your Thumb" (Kevin Godley, Lol Creme) 1981
4. 10cc "Life Is a Minestrone" (Creme, Stewart) 1975
5. Godley & Creme "An Englishman in New York" (Godley, Creme) 1979
6. 10cc "Art for Art's Sake" (Stewart, Gouldman) 1975
7. 10cc "Donna" (Godley, Creme) 1972
8. Godley & Creme "Snack Attack (Remix)" 1987 (Original Version 1981)
9. Godley & Creme "Cry" (Godley, Creme) 1985
10. 10cc "The Things We Do for Love" (Stewart, Gouldman) 1976
11. Godley & Creme "Wedding Bells" (Godley, Creme) 1981
12. 10cc "I'm Mandy Fly Me" (Stewart, Gouldman, Godley) 1976
13. 10cc "Good Morning Judge" (Stewart, Gouldman) 1977
14. 10cc "Rubber Bullets" (Godley, Creme, Gouldman) 1973
15. Godley & Creme "Save a Mountain for Me" (Godley, Creme) 1982
16. 10cc "I'm Not in Love" (Stewart, Gouldman) 1975

== The video ==
A compilation of videos was assembled and released in 1988.

1. 10cc "Dreadlock Holiday"
2. 10cc "The Wall Street Shuffle" (Live)
3. Godley & Creme "An Englishman in New York"
4. Godley & Creme "Wedding Bells"
5. 10cc "The Things We Do for Love"
6. 10cc "Good Morning Judge"
7. Godley & Creme "Golden Boy"
8. 10cc "I'm Mandy Fly Me"
9. 10cc "Feel the Love"
10. 10cc "I'm Not in Love" (Live)
11. Godley & Creme – History Mix – featuring "Cry" (Various clips of the promos directed by and featuring them and 10cc)

The video has since been repackaged as the companion to the Greatest Hits ... And More compilation from 2006, available as a DVD.

== Certifications ==
Certifications for Changing Faces - The Very Best Of 10Cc And Godley And Creme
Region	Certification	Certified units/sales
United Kingdom (BPI)	Platinum	300,000^{^}
^{^} Shipments figures based on certification alone.
