= The History Mix Volume 1 =

Studio album by Godley & Creme
- Released: June 1985
- Genres: Pop rock; art rock; audio collage
- Length: 55:57
- Label: Polydor
- Producers: Kevin Godley; Lol Creme; Nigel Gray; J. J. Jeczalik; Eric Stewart; Graham Gouldman; Trevor Horn

Godley & Creme chronology
Birds of Prey (1983)	The History Mix Volume 1 (1985)	Goodbye Blue Sky (1988)

Singles from The History Mix Volume 1
- 1. "Cry" Released: 11 March 1985; 2. "Golden Boy (Remix)" Released: September 1985

Professional ratings
Review scores
Source	Rating
AllMusic	4.5/5 stars
The Virgin Encyclopedia of Eighties Music	4/5 stars

The History Mix Volume 1 is the sixth studio album by the English duo Godley & Creme, released in June 1985 by Polydor Records. The album was a remix of songs spanning the career of Godley & Creme and their earlier bands, 10cc, Doctor Father and Hotlegs.

== Overview ==
The album produced two singles, "Cry" and a remix of "Golden Boy", the former of which became a groundbreaking music video featuring numerous "changing faces" that cross-faded from one to another as they mimed the lyrics to the song.

"Wet Rubber Soup" was also made into a video, which was effectively a collage of snippets from Godley and Creme's past work. "Cry" is featured at the end, with a version of the video slightly different from the single version – one part shows Lol Creme 'morphing' into Gonzo from the Muppets.

In an interview in Musician magazine in 1985, Lol Creme said: "We're not in the music business. We left it in 1976 and we haven't taken it seriously since. We decided to celebrate our 25 years together by taking all the music we've ever done – demos, masters, whatever – and putting it in a musical blender, the Fairlight [CMI]. Then we got J. J. [Jeczalik] of Art of Noise to reprogram the sounds to a disco beat so we could dance at our party."

== Release ==
The album was originally released in a number of variants depending on the format and territory. The core version of the album consists of 3 tracks which was released as a UK LP. For the international release the second side of the LP was replaced with previously released songs. For the CD release the original UK track listing was combined with the international version, and the first two tracks were combined as one.

The album was reissued in 2004 as "History Mix Vol. 1...Plus" which added tracks from "Cry", "Golden Boy" and "Snack Attack" singles to the core album version.

== Critical reception ==
A contemporary reviewer for Hi-Fi News & Record Review deemed it "the oddest concoction I've ever heard; it's as if video wizards Godley and Creme were trying to do a pop video without the visuals." They highlighted the "disconcerting medleys" that comprise the album, which they said "seems like the world's first successful audio collage. Sonically, this is a transient response tester all the way through, and so effects-laden that it's hard to assess in musical terms."

== Track listing ==
Side one

1. "Wet Rubber Soup" – 12:25
  - Includes: "Rubber Bullets" (Kevin Godley, Lol Creme, Graham Gouldman), "Life Is a Minestrone" (Creme, Eric Stewart), "I'm Not in Love" (Gouldman, Stewart), various excerpts from Consequences (1977)
2. "Cry" (Godley, Creme) – 6:32

Side two

1. "Expanding the Business / The 'Dare You' Man / Hum Drum Boys in Paris / Mountain Tension" – 17:03
  - Includes: "Business Is Business" (Godley, Creme), "How Dare You" (Godley, Creme), "Neanderthal Man" (Godley, Creme, Stewart), "This Sporting Life" (Godley, Creme), "One Night in Paris" (Godley, Creme), "The Dean and I" (Godley, Creme), "Sand in My Face" (Godley, Creme, Gouldman), "Umbopo" (Godley, Creme)

All tracks are written by Godley, Creme.

Bonus tracks on original CD release / side two of the international LP
No.	Title	Length
4.	"Light Me Up"	4:30
5.	"An Englishman in New York"	5:52
6.	"Save a Mountain for Me"	3:34
7.	"Golden Boy"	5:48

Additional track on the US and Canadian release at the start of side two

3. "Cry (Single Edit)" – 3:54

Bonus tracks on the 2004 Plus version
No.	Title	Length
4.	"Cry (Single Edit)"	3:54
5.	"Love Bombs"	3:55
6.	"Snack Attack"	6:52
7.	"Wet Rubber Soup (Edit)"	3:27
8.	"Golden Boy (Remix)"	5:49
9.	"Light Me Up"	4:28
10.	"Golden Boy" (12" Mix)"	4:57

Bonus tracks on 2006 Japanese reissue
No.	Title	Length
4.	"Light Me Up"	4:30
5.	"An Englishman in New York"	5:52
6.	"Save a Mountain for Me"	3:34
7.	"Golden Boy"	5:48
8.	"Cry (Extended Remix)"	7:27
9.	"Snack Attack (Extended Remix)"	9:50

== Personnel ==
- Kevin Godley
- Lol Creme
- Nigel Gray
- J. J. Jeczalik
- Trevor Horn
- Eric Stewart
- Graham Gouldman
