= Philosopher King =

A philosopher king is a type of ruler theorized by the Greek philosopher Plato.

Philosopher King or Philosopher Kings may also refer to:

- The Philosopher Kings, a Canadian R&B band
  - The Philosopher Kings, the band's 1994 debut album
- "Philosopher King", 2016 song by Dance Gavin Dance from Mothership
- The Philosopher Kings (film), a 2009 documentary
- The Philosopher Kings (novel), a 2015 fantasy/science fiction novel by Jo Walton
- A nickname used to describe President of El Salvador Nayib Bukele
