= Mistrial (album) =

Studio album by Lou Reed
- Released: April 1986
- Recorded: 1986
- Studio: Power Station, New York City
- Genre: Pop rock; new wave; funk
- Length: 39:12
- Label: RCA Victor
- Producer: Lou Reed; Fernando Saunders

Lou Reed chronology
City Lights (1985)	Mistrial (1986)	New York (1989)

Lou Reed studio album chronology
New Sensations (1984)	Mistrial (1986)	New York (1989)

Singles from Mistrial
- 1. "The Original Wrapper" Released: April 1986; 2. "No Money Down" Released: April 1986

Professional ratings
Review scores
Source	Rating
AllMusic	3/5 stars
Chicago Tribune	2.5/4 stars
Robert Christgau	B
Kerrang!	4/5 stars
Rolling Stone	(favorable)

Mistrial is the fourteenth solo studio album by American rock musician Lou Reed, released in April 1986 by RCA Records two years after his previous studio album, New Sensations (1984). Fernando Saunders and Reed produced the album.

Mistrial peaked at No. 47 on the U.S. Billboard 200 and at No. 69 on the UK Albums Chart. Two singles were released from the album: "The Original Wrapper" and "No Money Down" with the latter being the only single to chart, peaking at No. 75 on the ARIA Charts. A music video directed by rock duo Godley & Creme, was created for "No Money Down" that featured an animatronic Lou Reed, and a music video was also created for "The Original Wrapper" which features time-lapse photography of New Yorkers on the street.

Panamanian singer Rubén Blades provided backing vocals on two tracks, "I Remember You" and "Tell It to Your Heart", while punk rock musician Jim Carroll sang backing vocals on one, "Video Violence".

== Track listing ==
All tracks are written by Lou Reed.

Side one
No.	Title	Length
1.	"Mistrial"	3:20
2.	"No Money Down"	3:09
3.	"Outside"	3:02
4.	"Don't Hurt a Woman"	3:59
5.	"Video Violence"	5:35

Side two
No.	Title	Length
6.	"Spit It Out"	3:39
7.	"The Original Wrapper"	3:37
8.	"Mama's Got a Lover"	4:12
9.	"I Remember You"	3:13
10.	"Tell It to Your Heart"	5:08
Total length:		39:12

== Personnel ==
Adapted from the Mistrial liner notes.

Musicians

- Lou Reed – vocals, guitars (1, 3, 5, 6, 8, 9), lead guitar (2, 4, 10), rhythm guitar (2, 4, 10), power guitar (4, 7, 10)
- Eddie Martinez – rhythm guitar (2, 4, 7)
- Fernando Saunders – bass, drum programming (2, 4–9), backing vocals (2, 8, 9), synth bass (3), percussion (3), rhythm guitar (4, 10), acoustic piano (9)
- J.T. Lewis – drums (1, 4, 10), percussion (2)
- Sammy Merendino – percussion (2, 5, 7), drum programming (3, 4, 10)
- Rick Bell – tenor saxophone (2)
- Jim Carroll – backing vocals (5)
- Rubén Blades – backing vocals (9, 10)

Production and artwork

- Lou Reed – producer
- Fernando Saunders – producer
- Dave Greenberg – recording
- Bruce Lampcov – digital mixing, additional recording
- Michael Christopher – assistant engineer
- Scott Hull – digital editing
- Bob Ludwig – mastering at Masterdisk (New York, NY)
- Sylvia Reed – cover design
- Waring Abbott – photography
- Frank Campbell – equipment
- John Shur – equipment (guitars)

== Charts ==
Chart(1986)	Peak position
Australian Albums (Kent Music Report)	47
Dutch Album Chart	42
UK Albums Chart	69
US Billboard 200	47

== See also ==
- List of albums released in 1986
- Lou Reed's discography
