= Famous, Rich and Beautiful =

Studio album by the Philosopher Kings
- Released: October 7, 1997
- Studio: Studio 4 (Philadelphia)
- Genres: R&B; pop
- Label: Columbia
- Producer: Joe "The Butcher" Nicolo

The Philosopher Kings chronology
The Philosopher Kings (1994)	Famous, Rich and Beautiful (1997)	One Night Stand (1999)

Famous, Rich and Beautiful is the second studio album by Canadian R&B band the Philosopher Kings, released in 1997.

The band's most successful album, Famous, Rich and Beautiful earned the group several Juno Award nominations: for Best R&B/Soul Recording of the Year in 1998, and for Pop Album of the Year and Single of the Year (for "Hurts to Love You") in 1999. The songs "I Am the Man", "You Don't Love Me (Like You Used to Do)" and "Cry", a cover of the Godley & Creme song, were also notable hit singles from the album.

The song "Oleo" is featured in the 1998 film Dog Park.

== Commercial performance ==
Famous, Rich and Beautiful peaked at #62 on the RPM Canadian Albums Chart. In 1998, the album was certified platinum in Canada. The album was among the top 90 best-selling albums in Canada of 1998, ranking at #88.

== Track listing ==
1. "Hurts to Love You" (5:21)
2. "I Am the Man" (4:24)
3. "You Stepped on My Life" (4:21)
4. "You Don't Love Me (Like You Used to Do)" (4:23)
5. "Little Rosie" (4:34)
6. "Oleo" (6:06)
7. "End" (2:50)
8. "Super Sugar Supreme" (3:33)
9. "Head First" (3:38)
10. "New Messiah" (4:07)
11. "You're Allowed" (3:43)
12. "Cry" (3:04)
13. "Wide Awake" (4:56)
14. "Dinah" (2:07)
