= Frabjous Days: The Secret World of Godley & Creme 1967–1969 =

Studio album and compilation album by Godley & Creme
- Released: 10 June 2022
- Recorded: June – September 1969; January 1968 – late 1969 (bonus tracks)
- Genre: Psychedelic pop; psychedelic folk
- Length: 57:48
- Label: Grapefruit Records
- Producer: Tony Meehan

Godley & Creme chronology
Body of Work: 1978–1988 (2017)	Frabjous Days: The Secret World of Godley & Creme 1967–1969 (2022)

Frabjous Days: The Secret World of Godley & Creme 1967–1969 is an album by Godley & Creme, released on Grapefruit Records in 2022.

== Background and recording ==
Lol Creme and Kevin Godley, who grew up in the same neighbourhood in Prestwich. In the early 1960s Godley played drums in a local band, The Sabres, which later became The Magic Lanterns). Godley shortly after joined the Mockingbirds, a band led by Graham Gouldman which released a number of singles on Columbia, Decca, and Immediate. During and shortly after their college years—in which Godley attended Stoke-on-Trent College of Art and Creme attended the Birmingham School of Art, both with majors in graphic design—the two kept close contact and wrote and performed songs and collaborated on visual art and student film projects, designing standees for films in the commercial art world together to earn money in the meantime.

One of the duo's musical treatments for film inspired Gouldman to write the song "Pamela, Pamela" for Wayne Fontana, with whom they were members of the Mindbenders. "Pamela, Pamela" became a hit in late 1966, which persuaded the trio to pursue music full time as Creme and Godley's studies came to a close. Two songs were recorded at Olympic Studios in 1967, "It's the Best Seaside in the World" and "Bull in a China Shop"; however, they were unable to convince a record label to sign on the trio with these songs, and these recordings were shelved and subsequently lost. They tried again the following year, this time under the auspices of the Mindbenders's manager Jim O'Farrell. Godley, Creme, and Gouldman recorded "Seeing Things Green" and "Easy Life", which were released as the A- and B-sides of a single in early 1968 on CBS (the UK arm of Columbia Records), billed under the tentative group name the Yellow Bellow Room Boom—due to the trio's inability to commit to a record label contract on account of Creme and Godley's still-ongoing studies. The single failed to perform in the charts, but it netted Godley and Creme a song publishing deal with Beacon Music for two songs. The two wrote, and shortly after recorded with Gouldman, "One and One Make Love" and "Over and Above My Head". Although projected to be the A- and B-sides of the tentative group's follow-up single, they never materialised until the release of Frabjous Days.

Gouldman meanwhile had gained employment at Giorgio Gomelsky's Marmalade Records and asked Godley and Creme one day to join him for a recording session overseen by Gomelsky. When Gomelsky heard Godley's vocals, he was so impressed that he offered him and Creme a record deal. Two songs recorded from this session, "The Late Mr. Late" and "To Fly Away"—the former penned and sang by Gouldman and the latter by Godley and Creme—appeared on Marmalade's 100 Proof sampler album in 1969. In preparation for Godley and Creme's first recording session for Marmalade Records, Gomelsky christened the duo Frabjoy & the Runcible Spoon, named after two nonsense phrases in Alice's Adventures in Wonderland. Gomelsky, who envisioned Godley and Creme as the UK's answer to Simon & Garfunkel, hired Gouldman and Eric Stewart as session musicians for Frabjoy & the Runcible Spoon's first single, "I'm Beside Myself" backed with "Animal Song". This single was released in late summer 1969 to infrequent radio play. All four musicians would later become part of the band Hotlegs, later 10cc, in the 1970s. Five more songs were recorded in September 1969 by the four were slated for inclusion on Frabjoy & the Runcible Spoon's first LP, which was also to include remastered versions of "I'm Beside Myself" and "To Fly Away". However, Marmalade Records soon found itself in financial ruin and dissolved before 1970. Godley and Creme were hopeful that Marmalade's parent company Polydor Records would pick up the LP the following year, after "I'm Beside Myself" was included on a Polydor compilation album, but this was to no avail.

== Release ==
Announced for pre-order in April 2022, Frabjous Days was released on Grapefruit Records on 10 June 2022. It marks the first release of the abandoned LP, the abandoned single "One and One Make Love" backed with "Over and Above My Head", as well as several session outtakes in which Godley, Creme, Gouldman, Stewart performed two Gouldman-penned songs, "Hot Sun" and "Virgin Soldiers". The final two tracks on the album, "Hello Blinkers" and "Goodnight Blinkers", were released in 1969 as a novelty single for the Blinkers nightclub in Manchester. The album art of Frabjous Days is a previously unpublished Marmalade publicity photo for Frabjoy & the Runcible Spoon; the album's liner notes comprise a "meticulously researched" background on the recording sessions written by David Wells.

== Reception ==
Professional ratings
Review scores
Source	Rating
AllMusic	3.5/5 stars
Daily Express	3/5 stars
Mojo	3/5 stars
Record Collector	4/5 stars
Uncut	7/10

Ian Canty of Louder Than War wrote: "Frabjous Days is pretty much an essential purchase for any 10cc fan ... [but more] than that, this is an excellent collection of rarely heard psychedelia in its own right that deserves to be valued separately from its 10cc associations. This is a dynamite and highly enjoyable archive delve, one that reveals Godley & Creme's pop instincts and unique invention were already primed for innovation even at this early stage in their development. One to treasure." Of the LP portion of the compilation, Dave Thompson of Goldmine wrote that "it's clear who you are listening to[:] primal, brilliant, pre-10cc", singling out "Today" and "Take Me Back" as examples of this. Mark Deming of AllMusic wrote that, although lacking Godley & Creme's later "pointed satiric wit" as evident on 10cc's Sheet Music, "this is fine and imaginative pop with a psychedelic edge that's a treat for fans of '60s sounds and those who loved Godley & Creme's later work. The set also includes the Yellow Bellow Room Boom's sole 45, well-researched and entertaining liner notes, and pleasingly restored audio, and it's a splendid look at the juvenilia of one of the most fascinating partnerships in British rock."

== Track listing ==
All tracks written by Kevin Godley and Lol Creme, unless otherwise noted.

=== Unreleased LP ===
No.	Title	Recorded	Length
1.	"I'm Beside Myself"	September 1969	3:09
2.	"Chaplin House"	September 1969	3:24
3.	"Cowboys and Indians"	September 1969	3:23
4.	"It's the Best Seaside in the World"	September 1969	2:47
5.	"Fly Away"	September 1969	2:58
6.	"Take Me Back"	September 1969	5:52
7.	"Today"	September 1969	3:58
Total length:			25:31

=== 1969 Marmalade sessions outtakes and singles ===
No.	Title	Writer(s)	Recorded/Released	Length
8.	"Hot Sun"	Graham Gouldman	July 1969	2:30
9.	"Virgin Soldiers"	Graham Gouldman	July 1969	3:28
10.	"The Late Mr. Late"	Graham Gouldman	June 1969	2:34
11.	"To Fly Away" (100 Proof version)		June 1969	2:48
12.	"I'm Beside Myself" (single version)		September 1969	2:53
13.	"Animal Song"		September 1969	2:22
Total length:				16:35

=== Bonus tracks ===
No.	Title	Recorded/released	Length
14.	"Seeing Things Green"	January 1968	2:26
15.	"Easy Life"	January 1968	3:08
16.	"One and One Make Love"	July 1968	3:06
17.	"Over and Above My Head"	July 1968	2:52
18.	"Hello Blinkers"	late 1969	2:21
19.	"Goodnight Blinkers"	late 1969	1:58
Total length:			15:51; 57:48
