= Retro (Lou Reed album) =

Compilation album by Lou Reed
- Released: March 12, 1989
- Genre: Rock
- Length: 1:11:14
- Label: RCA

Lou Reed chronology
Live in Concert (1996)	Retro (1989)	Perfect Night: Live in London (1998)

Professional ratings
Review scores
Source	Rating
AllMusic	3/5 stars

Retro is a compilation album by American rock musician Lou Reed, released on March 12, 1989 in the United Kingdom by RCA Records.

== Track listing ==
1. "I Love You, Suzanne"
2. "Wild Child"
3. "How Do You Think It Feels"
4. "Lady Day"
5. "Coney Island Baby"
6. "Sweet Jane" (live)
7. "Vicious"
8. "Sally Can't Dance"
9. "Berlin"
10. "Caroline Says II"
11. "Perfect Day"
12. "Kill Your Sons"
13. "White Light/White Heat" (live)
14. "I'm Waiting for the Man" (The Velvet Underground)
15. "Heroin" (The Velvet Underground)
16. "Walk on the Wild Side"
17. "Satellite of Love"

== Certifications ==
Region	Certification	Certified units/sales
Australia (ARIA)	Gold	35,000^{^}
^{^} Shipments figures based on certification alone.
