= Perfect Night: Live in London =

Live album by Lou Reed
- Released: April 21, 1998
- Recorded: July 3, 1997
- Venue: Royal Festival Hall, London
- Genre: Rock
- Length: 66:08
- Label: Sire
- Producer: Lou Reed; Mike Rathke

Lou Reed chronology
Retro (1998)	Perfect Night: Live in London (1998)	A Retrospective (1998)

Professional ratings
Review scores
Source	Rating
AllMusic	2.5/5 stars
Rolling Stone	3/5 stars

Perfect Night: Live in London is a live album by American musician Lou Reed recorded during the Meltdown '97 festival. It includes a version of the Velvet Underground's "I'll Be Your Mirror", originally sung by Nico. The album includes two songs, "Talking Book" and "Into the Divine" from the 1996 play Time Rocker Reed's collaboration with Robert Wilson (direction and design), and Darryl Pinckney (text). The cover photograph was taken by Timothy Greenfield-Sanders. In Australia, the 2-CD tour edition of Reed's 2000 album Ecstasy included Perfect Night as the second disc.

== Track listing ==
All tracks are written by Lou Reed.

Side one

1. "I'll Be Your Mirror" – 3:16
2. "Perfect Day" – 3:46
3. "The Kids" – 4:26
4. "Vicious" – 5:40
5. "Busload of Faith" – 4:27
6. "Kicks" – 4:16
7. "Talking Book" – 3:43
8. "Into the Divine" – 3:34

Side two

9. "Coney Island Baby" – 6:11
10. "New Sensations" – 6:07
11. "Why Do You Talk" – 2:38
12. "Riptide" – 4:13
13. "Original Wrapper" – 4:49
14. "Sex with Your Parents" – 2:56
15. "Dirty Blvd." – 6:06

== Personnel ==
Credits are adapted from the Perfect Night: Live in London liner notes.

- Lou Reed — guitar; vocals
- Mike Rathke — guitar
- Fernando Saunders — bass; backing vocals
- Tony "Thunder" Smith — drums
