= High in the City =

Single by Lou Reed

from the album New Sensations
- Released: 1984
- Studio: Skyline (New York City)
- Genre: Pop rock; new wave
- Length: 3:27
- Label: RCA
- Songwriter: Lou Reed
- Producers: John Jansen; Lou Reed

Lou Reed singles chronology
"My Red Joystick" (1984)	"High in the City" (1984)	"My Love Is Chemical" (1985)

Official audio
- "High in the City" on YouTube

High in the City is a song written and recorded by American rock musician Lou Reed, released on his thirteenth solo studio album, New Sensations (1984). Released as a 7" single exclusively in the Netherlands by RCA Records, it was the third and final single from the album, but like the single that preceded it, "My Red Joystick", it failed to chart. "High in the City" is the only single released from the album that didn't have a music video made for it.

A reggae-tinged track, it features a trombone solo by jazz musician Tom Malone towards the end of it, Malone had also arranged the horns on the track.

== Track listing ==
1. "High in the City"
2. "I Love You, Suzanne"
