= You Didn't Like It Because You Didn't Think of It =

Compilation album by Hotlegs
- Released: 1976
- Recorded: 1970–71
- Studio: Strawberry Studios, Stockport, Greater Manchester, England
- Genre: Rock
- Label: Philips
- Producer: Hotlegs

Hotlegs chronology
Thinks: School Stinks (1970)	You Didn't Like It Because You Didn't Think of It (1976)

You Didn't Like It Because You Didn't Think of It is a compilation album by British pop group Hotlegs.

== Overview ==
The album was released in 1976 after Hotlegs, a three-piece band from Stockport, near Manchester, had added a fourth member, Graham Gouldman, changed its name and achieved international chart success as 10cc.

The album was a revised version of Hotlegs' debut album, Thinks: School Stinks, which added "Neanderthal Man"'s B-side "You Didn't Like It Because You Didn't Think of It" (after which the album was titled), the single "Lady Sadie" along with its B-side "The Loser" and Song's repackaging exclusive "Today".

The album cover featured a drawing of the band by Godley and Creme.

=== 2012 reissue ===
The album was reissued on Grapefruit Records, a division of Cherry Red, in October 2012. Remastered by Paschal Byrne, this version included Thinks: School Stinks (1970) album as originally sequenced with the tracks that were substituted/added for You Didn't Like It Because You Didn't Think of It at the end of the CD including the slightly different alternate U.S. single mix of "Neanderthal Man". The resulting release put together all of the tracks released under Hotlegs' name.

This new edition also featured new artwork commissioned especially for this release.

== Track listing ==
1. "Um Wah, Um Woh" (Kevin Godley, Lol Creme, Eric Stewart) – 5:30
2. "Today" (Godley, Creme) – 4:04
3. "You Didn't Like It Because You Didn't Think of It" (Godley, Creme, Stewart) – 4:33
4. "Fly Away" (Godley, Creme) – 2:43
5. "Run Baby Run" (Godley, Creme, Stewart) – 2:50
6. "The Loser" (Godley, Creme Stewart) – 3:39
7. "Neanderthal Man" (Godley, Creme, Stewart) – 4:19
8. "How Many Times" (Godley, Creme, Stewart) – 3:57
9. "Desperate Dan" (Godley, Creme, Stewart) – 2:12
10. "Take Me Back" (Godley, Creme) – 5:01
11. "Lady Sadie" (Godley, Creme, Stewart) – 4:21
12. "All God's Children" (Godley, Creme, Stewart) – 4:00
13. "Suite F.A." (Godley, Creme) – 12:53
  - 1st Movement – On My Way
  - 2nd Movement – Indecision
  - 3rd Movement – The Return

=== 2012 reissue track listing ===
1. "Neanderthal Man"
2. "How Many Times"
3. "Desperate Dan"
4. "Take Me Back"
5. "Um Wah, Um Woh"
6. "Suite F.A."
7. "Fly Away"
8. "Run Baby Run"
9. "All God's Children"
10. "The Loser"
11. "Today"
12. "Lady Sadie"
13. "You Didn't Like It Because You Didn't Think of It"
14. "Neanderthal Man" (U.S. single mix)

(Tracks 1–9 from Thinks: School Stinks)

== Personnel ==
Hotlegs

- Lol Creme – guitar, bass, vocals, keyboards, arranger
- Eric Stewart – guitar, bass, vocals, arranger
- Kevin Godley – drums, vocals, arranger

Additional personnel

- Graham Gouldman – bass guitar ("Today")
- Tony Harrison – string arrangement ("Today")
- Peter Tattersall – left-handed boogie piano ("Desperate Dan")
- Mike Timoney – organ ("Take Me Back", "Today")
- Rod Morton – on-beat tambourine ("Desperate Dan")
- Baz Barker – violin ("How Many Times")
- Ian Brookes – trumpet
- Mike Bell – saxophone
- Cheadle Hulme High School Choir (Brian Day – arrangements and conducting) – vocals ("Suite F.A.")
