= An Englishman in New York =

An Englishman in New York may refer to:

- An Englishman in New York (song), a 1979 single by Godley & Creme
- An Englishman in New York (film), a 2009 biographical film about Quentin Crisp

== See also ==
- Englishman in New York, a 1988 single by Sting
