= L (Godley & Creme album) =

1978 studio album

Studio album by Godley & Creme
- Released: August 1978
- Recorded: March–June 1978; Surrey Sound Studios
- Genres: Art rock; avant-pop
- Length: 34:22
- Label: Mercury
- Producers: Kevin Godley, Lol Creme

Godley & Creme chronology
Consequences (1977)	L (1978)	Freeze Frame (1979)

Singles from L
- 1. "Sandwiches of You" / "Foreign Accents" Released: 5 January 1979

Professional ratings
Review scores
Source	Rating
Allmusic	1.5/5 stars
Birmingham Post	4/5 stars
Record Mirror	4/5 stars

L is the second album by Godley & Creme. It was released in 1978. At 34 minutes, it is less than a third as long as the group's previous effort, the ill-received triple concept album Consequences (1977). Despite this, L was also not received well commercially.

== Music ==
The songs contain much variation and artistry, dissonances, complex time signatures and melodies, poetic lyrics, and some echoes from Frank Zappa's Over-Nite Sensation (1973). Zappa is also name-checked on the song "Art School Canteen." The album was played almost completely by Godley and Creme, except for saxophones, and a brief vocal cameo by Paul Gambaccini.

The lyrics retained the satirical stance of some 10cc material, with songs such as "The Sporting Life" and "Art School Canteen", which deal with suicide and art school angst.

== Album cover ==
The album cover depicts an "L-plate", used in some countries to designate vehicles with novice drivers ("Learner"). Although the duo were generally known as 'Godley and Creme', the original cover merely repeats their surnames around its perimeter (on the back) and delineates their 'group' name as 'Godley + Creme' on the spine.

== Track listing ==
Side 1

1. "This Sporting Life" – 7:25
2. "Sandwiches of You" – 3:17
3. "Art School Canteen" – 3:00
4. "Group Life" – 4:11

Side 2

1. "Punchbag" – 4:44
2. "Foreign Accents" – 4:37
3. "Hit Factory/Business Is Business" – 7:08

== Personnel ==
Credits sourced from the original album liner notes and "Sound International"

- Kevin Godley – lead and backing vocals, drums (1, 2, 4, 5), xylophone (1, 2, 6), roto-toms (1), percussion (1, 2, 7), congas (3), triangle (4), clavinet (5), high-hat (6), tonal percussion (6), snare drum (6), bongos (7), drum machine (7), bass guitar (4)
- Lol Creme – lead and backing vocals, piano (1, 3–7), Rhodes electric piano (1, 4), guitars (1, 2, 4–7), Kramer bass guitar (1, 2, 5–7), Gizmo (1, 3, 5, 7), Farfisa organ (1), Guild 12-string acoustic guitar (3), Guild acoustic bass guitar (3), clavinet (4, 6), drums (7)
- Andy Mackay – baritone (7), tenor (6, 7), soprano (7), and alto saxophone (6, 7)
- Paul Gambaccini – Bad Samaritan voices (1)
- Jonathan Handelsman – alto and soprano saxophones (4)
- Chris Gray, Nigel Gray – engineers
