= The Gizmo =

Effects device for electric and bass guitars

The Gizmotron, originally developed and called the Gizmo, is an effects device for the electric guitar and bass guitar. It was invented in 1969 and patented in 1975 by the English rock musicians Kevin Godley and Lol Creme of the British rock group 10cc.

Taped or permanently attached to the body of an instrument, the original Gizmotron used small, motor driven plastic/rubber wheels to make the strings vibrate, yielding resonant, synthesizer-like sounds from each string, similar to a hurdy-gurdy. The device was famously used by Jimmy Page on parts of the Led Zeppelin album In Through the Out Door.

Musitronics, the company originally licensed to manufacture the commercial version of the Gizmotron, released the product to the public in 1979. Quality was inconsistent. According to Musitronics engineer Mike Beigel, "The product, though desired by many musicians at the time, simply could not be reliably manufactured and further – even at best – only worked on some notes of the instrument, guitar or bass." In a bid to solve problems with the Gizmotron, Musitronics hired Bob Moog to design an electronic device to "mask the inadequacies of the still unperfected product". Moog gave his opinion that he did not know how to "make it sound good enough" and advised that the project should be abandoned.

Plagued with design and manufacturing problems, the Musitronics Gizmotron did not live up to expectations and was a commercial failure. Production of the Musitronics Gizmotron ended in 1981 when the manufacturer filed for bankruptcy.

The Gizmotron 2.0 was developed by Aaron Kipness in 2013, and released in 2016. The Gizmotron 2.0 was sufficiently different to the original Gizmo in construction that Kipness was awarded a new patent for the design.

== Origins ==
=== 10cc ===
The original Gizmo was first used on 10cc's instrumental "Gizmo My Way", a song arranged as a type of laid back beach music, where it appears as a slide guitar effect and sustained background effect. "Gizmo My Way" was the B-side to "The Wall Street Shuffle". 10cc's second album, Sheet Music (1974) included more uses of The Gizmo, most notably on the track "Old Wild Men". Its presence is heard throughout most of the track as a unique shimmering background guitar effect. The Gizmo was also used on the Sheet Music track "Baron Samedi".

The Gizmo continued to be used on 10cc's subsequent albums The Original Soundtrack (1975) and How Dare You! (1976) on the tracks "Blackmail", "Brand New Day", "Iceberg", and "Don't Hang Up". Godley and Creme continued to use the Gizmo after they had left 10cc.

=== Godley & Creme ===
The Gizmo's ability to create a wide range of sounds was central to the production of Godley and Creme's first post-10cc project, the 1977 triple concept album, Consequences. Godley and Creme left 10cc to create Consequences which was intended to be a promotional album to market the "Gizmo". According to Paul Gambaccini's sleeve notes for Consequences, 10cc were unable to afford an orchestra for their early albums, so Creme and Godley imagined an effects unit that would enable a guitar to produce violin-like sounds (this was some years before the development of digital sampling). They brought their concept to the University of Manchester, where John McConnell created the original prototype of the Gizmo.

Other Godley & Creme albums featuring the Gizmo include L and Freeze Frame.

== Mechanism ==
The device, a small enclosure attached to the guitar, consists of small motor-driven wheels with serrated edges to match the size of each string. The continuous bowing action is activated by pressing one or all of keys located on the top of the unit. Pressing a key allows the wheel to descend against a motor-driven shaft and bow the corresponding string, while the other hand remains free to fret single notes or full chords.

John McConnell, a senior lecturer in physics at the University of Manchester Institute of Science and Technology (UMIST), assisted Godley and Creme in the development of the prototype. He considered it critical that the instrument retain the natural decay of a note rather than the sharp cut-off often experienced with an electronic synthesizer. Godley and Creme used only the original prototype Gizmo in 10cc recordings.

Musitronics offered two versions of the Gizmotron to the public; one for guitar and one for bass. Ultimately, few Musitronics Gizmotrons were made; bass versions were produced in a much larger quantity than guitar versions.

== Inherent difficulties ==
A fault with the prototype and Musitronics Gizmotron was that the wheels were affected by conditions such as humidity and temperature. Additionally, due to deficiencies in the design of these units, the wheels would either produce harmonics of their own that varied with the speed of the wheel, or would act as a secondary bridge and produce dissonant overtones, depending on the notes played. According to Kevin Godley, "Some days it sounded absolutely beautiful and other days it sounded like shit. Sometimes it was like a chainsaw, and sometimes it sounded like a cello and other times it varied between to two, so it was never a particularly stable piece of kit, but we persevered with it."

The severity of these problems could be minimized by adjusting the proximity of the wheels to the guitar strings with extreme precision. Adjustment was very time-consuming, where each wheel (and arm) is moved closer or farther to a string to achieve the purest tone. Improper set-up of these wheels meant either a lack of tone, or—usually in the case of over-eager amateur or impatient guitarists—an undesirably harsh tone caused by wheels being forced too tightly against the strings. Using the Gizmotron required that guitarists modify their playing techniques to use only a very light touch when pressing the keys. Specific and repeated instructions in the Gizmotron owner's manual stress this.

In the Musitronics version of the Gizmotron, an improper set-up resulted in a quick wearing down of the wheels for which there were no replacements—the wheels were not removable from the arm attachments. Musitronics Gizmotron wheels were expensive and problematic to produce.

== Musitronics and Gizmo Inc. bankruptcy ==
Musitronics created a separate division, Gizmo Inc., to produce the Gizmotron and solve its problems. Deeply in debt and unable to raise the funding necessary to continue operations, due largely to a failed Musitronics marketing deal with ARP Instruments, Gizmo Inc. declared bankruptcy in 1981, shortly after its president, Aaron Newman, suffered a heart attack.

Today, intact and working Musitronics Gizmotrons are virtually non-existent. The wheels and arm attachments were made of a plastic (polyoxymethylene) that cracks and weakens over time. As a result, the wheels and arms of all Musitronics Gizmotrons become brittle and disintegrate even in "like new" unopened boxes. Other guitar effects have since been used to create sustained tones, but because of the Gizmotron's mechanical nature and physics involved, electronics alone have not been able to replicate the sound.

== Gizmotron 2.0 ==
In March 2013, it was reported in Vintage Guitar Magazine that Aaron Kipness was working on plans to launch a new and improved Gizmotron 2.0. The Gizmotron 2.0 debuted at the summer NAMM show in 2015 and on 3 February 2016 the Gizmotron 2.0 was released. The innovations made to Godley and Creme's original design were substantial enough that Kipness was awarded a US patent (9,997,144) for the Gizmotron 2.0.

== Use by artists ==
The Musitronics and Prototype Gizmotron can be heard on:

- The Scaffold's recording of "Liverpool Lou" (1974).
- Paul McCartney's Wings song "I'm Carrying" from London Town (1978).
- Led Zeppelin's album In Through the Out Door (1979), where Jimmy Page uses it on the intro of "In the Evening" as well as within "Carouselambra".
- The Throbbing Gristle album 20 Jazz Funk Greats (Industrial Records, 1979), played by Cosey Fanni Tutti.
- The Siouxsie and the Banshees song "Into the Light" from Juju (1981), played by John McGeoch.
- The Church's "Violet Town", from Remote Luxury (1984) where it is played by Marty Willson-Piper.
- This Mortal Coil's recording It'll End in Tears (4AD), where it was played (with great difficulty) by Simon Raymonde of Cocteau Twins on the track "A Single Wish".
- John Wilson, guitarist for Meat Beat Manifesto used both a bass and guitar Gizmotron live and on recordings from 1996 to 1998.
- Steve Hackett on Please Don't Touch title track and Wind and Wuthering.

== See also ==
- Mu-Tron
- ARP Instruments, Inc. – the company bought Musitronics and renamed it to Gizmo Inc.
- Guitar harmonic § String harmonics driven by a magnetic field – Similar guitar systems which use electromagnetism, rather than mechanical energy, to sustain and in some cases to activate the strings:
  - EBow
  - Fernandes Sustainer
  - Infinite Guitar
  - Moog Guitar
