= No Money Down (Lou Reed song) =

1986 single by Lou Reed

Single by Lou Reed

from the album Mistrial
- B-side: "Don't Hurt a Woman"
- Released: April 10, 1986
- Recorded: 1986
- Studio: Power Station (New York City)
- Genre: Pop rock; new wave; funk
- Length: 3:09
- Label: RCA
- Songwriter: Lou Reed
- Producers: Lou Reed; Fernando Saunders

Lou Reed singles chronology
"The Original Wrapper" (1986)	"No Money Down" (1986)	"Soul Man" (1986)

Music video
- "No Money Down" on YouTube

"No Money Down" is a song written and recorded by American rock musician Lou Reed, released as both a 7" and 12" single from his fourteenth solo studio album, Mistrial (1986). The only single to chart from the album, it peaked at No. 75 on the Australian ARIA singles chart and No. 19 on the Album Rock Tracks chart.

Eddie Martinez provided the rhythm guitar on the track. Martinez had played on Run-DMC's "Rock Box" and the "King of Rock" a couple of years prior this recording, and Rick Bell played the tenor saxophone. Bell was a former member of the Michael Stanley band, and had also played with Peter Gabriel of Genesis.

== Music video ==
The official music video was filmed in March 1986 in England, and directed by English rock duo Godley & Creme formerly of 10cc, featuring a simple animatronic version of Reed miming along to the song. During the final verse, gloved human hands tear away its wig, sunglasses, and rubber skin to expose the skeleton beneath, then pull off underlying components of the face.

The animatronic was originally intended for a music video for "Video Violence", but "No Money Down" was released as a single instead, and it had already been made so the animatronic was still used despite the change in theme. It was deemed too graphic for MTV, who had received complaints that it was distressing to younger viewers and making them cry, and was almost completely banned. In one of his final interviews, Reed described the music video as "really funny", whilst implying that it didn't match the theme of the song.

It was later featured on an episode of adult animated sitcom Beavis and Butt-Head.

== Live performances ==
Reed performed the song live four times during Amnesty International's A Conspiracy of Hope short tour, including a filmed performance of the song at Giants Stadium, in East Rutherford, New Jersey, with altered lyrics.

== Track listing ==
- Original 7-inch single version
1. "No Money Down" – 3:10
2. "Don't Hurt a Woman" – 4:01
- Original 12-inch single version
1. "No Money Down" (Extended Version) – 5:40
2. "No Money Down" (Dub Version) – 5:22
3. "Don't Hurt a Woman" – 4:01

== Chart performance ==
Chart (1986)	Peak Position
Australia (Kent Music Report)	75
US Mainstream Rock (Billboard)	19
