= Ismism =

Studio album by Godley & Creme
- Released: 18 October 1981
- Recorded: April–May 1980
- Studio: Lymehouse (Leatherhead)
- Genres: Pop rock; new wave; synth-pop
- Length: 44:02
- Label: Polydor
- Producers: Kevin Godley; Lol Creme

Godley & Creme chronology
Freeze Frame (1979)	Ismism (1981)	Birds of Prey (1983)

Singles from Ismism
- 1. "Under Your Thumb" Released: 1981; 2. "Wedding Bells" Released: 1981; 3. "Snack Attack" Released: 1982

US cover
- The US cover of Snack Attack

Ismism is the fourth studio album by the English duo Godley & Creme, released on 18 October 1981 by Polydor Records. In the US it was released under the name Snack Attack. It was recorded between April–May 1980 at Lymehouse Studios in Leatherhead, Surrey and engineered and re-mixed at Nigel Gray's Surrey Sound Studios.

Ismism peaked at No. 29 on the UK Albums Chart and at No. 28 on the Dutch Albums Chart, making it their best-selling studio album. Three singles were released from the album: "Under Your Thumb", "Wedding Bells" and "Snack Attack", with the first two singles charting within the Top 10 on the UK Singles Chart.

Ismism was reissued on CD in 2004 under Ismism... Plus name (with other Godley & Creme albums) with singles' B-sides as bonus tracks.

== Artwork ==
The album's cover artwork, designed by Ben Kelly, originally was in white with the title spelt out via holes in the cover which showed a contrasting colour beneath. Later versions used coloured dots instead of holes. An alternative version of the cover featured a black background.

== Critical reception ==
Professional ratings
Review scores
Source	Rating
AllMusic	2/5 stars
Smash Hits	4/10
The Virgin Encyclopedia of Eighties Music	3/5 stars

In a retrospective review for AllMusic, critic Mark Allan wrote of the album, "Prone to pretension, these two English Frank Zappas revel in outright silliness on much of this album", adding that "throughout all of this, you get the nagging feeling this pair was capable of so much more."

== Track listing ==
All tracks are written by Kevin Godley and Lol Creme.

Side one
No.	Title	Length
1.	"Snack Attack"	7:07
2.	"Under Your Thumb"	4:40
3.	"Joey's Camel"	5:23
4.	"The Problem"	4:06
5.	"Ready for Ralph"	2:20

Side two
No.	Title	Length
6.	"Wedding Bells"	3:21
7.	"Lonnie"	4:45
8.	"Sale of the Century"	4:20
9.	"The Party"	8:00
Total length:		44:02

Bonus tracks on the 2004 Plus edition
No.	Title	Length
10.	"Power Behind The Throne"	3:39
11.	"Babies"	4:42
12.	"Strange Apparatus" ("An Englishman in New York" single edit)	3:53

Bonus tracks on the 2006 Japanese edition
No.	Title	Length
10.	"Power Behind The Throne"	3:39
11.	"Babies"	4:42
12.	"Snack Attack (Extended Version)"	6:47

== Personnel ==
Credits are adapted from the Ismism liner notes.

Musicians

- Kevin Godley – vocals; drums; percussion; drum machine
- Lol Creme – vocals; bass; guitar; keyboards; synthesizers
- Bimbo Acock – saxophone

Production and artwork

- Kevin Godley – producer
- Lol Creme – producer; engineer
- Nigel Gray – mixer
- Ben Kelly – artwork

== Charts ==
Chart (1981/82)	Peak position
Australian (Kent Music Report)	77
Dutch Albums (Album Top 100)	28
UK Albums (Official Charts)	29
