= City Lights (Lou Reed album) =

City Lights: Classic Performances by Lou Reed

Compilation album by Lou Reed
- Released: 1985
- Genre: Rock
- Length: 41:58
- Label: Arista
- Producers: Lou Reed; Michael Fonfara; Richard Robinson

Lou Reed chronology
New Sensations (1984)	City Lights: Classic Performances by Lou Reed (1985)	Mistrial (1986)

City Lights: Classic Performances by Lou Reed is a compilation album by Lou Reed.

== Track listing ==
All tracks are written by Lou Reed, except "City Lights", written by Reed and Nils Lofgren, and "Think It Over", written by Reed and Michael Fonfara.

No.	Title	Original album	Length
1.	"Coney Island Baby (live)"	Live: Take No Prisoners (1978)	8:41
2.	"Berlin (Live)"	Live: Take No Prisoners	5:46
3.	"Satellite Of Love (live)"	Live: Take No Prisoners	6:54
4.	"Senselessly Cruel"	Rock and Roll Heart (1976)	2:06
5.	"Temporary Thing"	Rock and Roll Heart	5:14
6.	"Gimmie Some Good Times"	Street Hassle (1977)	3:15
7.	"City Lights (Live)"	The Bells (1979)	3:07
8.	"Looking for Love"	The Bells	3:30
9.	"Think It Over"	Growing Up in Public (1980)	3:25
