= Dirty Blvd. =

Single by Lou Reed

from the album New York
- B-side: "Last Great American Whale"
- Released: February 1989
- Recorded: 1988
- Studio: Mediasound Studio B (New York City)
- Genre: Rock; gospel; pop
- Length: 3:29
- Label: Sire
- Songwriter: Lou Reed
- Producers: Lou Reed; Fred Maher

Lou Reed singles chronology
"Romeo Had Juliette" (1989)	"Dirty Blvd." (1989)	"Busload of Faith" (1989)

Music video
- "Dirty Blvd." on YouTube

"Dirty Blvd." is a song by American rock musician Lou Reed from his fifteenth solo studio album, New York (1989). The song contrasts the poor and the rich in New York City, and topped the Billboard Modern Rock Tracks chart for four weeks in early 1989. Live versions appear on Perfect Night: Live in London (1998) and Animal Serenade (2004). "Dirty Blvd." was one of the four songs Reed performed with David Bowie on the latter's 50th birthday celebration in 1997. "Dirty Blvd." is a three-chord rock song featuring a progression with a repeated sequence of G D A D.

== Track listing ==
7" single

1. "Dirty Blvd."
2. "Last Great American Whale"

12" single

1. "Dirty Blvd."
2. "Last Great American Whale"
3. "The Room"

== Personnel ==
- Lou Reed – lead and background vocals, guitar
- Mike Rathke – guitar
- Rob Wasserman – electric upright bass
- Fred Maher – drums
- Dion DiMucci – backing vocals
- Jeffrey Lesser – backing vocals

== Charts ==
Chart (1989)	Peak position
Australia (ARIA)	45
Billboard Album Rock Tracks	18
Billboard Modern Rock Tracks	1

== See also ==
- List of Billboard Modern Rock Tracks number ones of the 1980s
