= Castles in the Sand (song) =

2005 song by The Philosopher Kings

Single by the Philosopher Kings

from the album Castles
- Released: 2005
- Length: 4:23
- Label: Sony BMG
- Songwriter(s): The Philosopher Kings
- Producer(s): The Philosopher Kings

The Philosopher Kings singles chronology
"If I Ever Lose This Heaven" (2000)	"Castles in the Sand" (2005)	"Give Back the Love" (2006)

"Castles in the Sand" is a song by Canadian pop rock group the Philosopher Kings. Released in 2005 as the lead single from their fourth studio album, Castles, it reached the top 10 on both the adult contemporary and hot adult contemporary charts in Canada. It was the first single released by the group in over five years since their 2000 single, "If I Ever Lose This Heaven".

== Charts ==
Chart (2005–2006)	Peak position
Canada AC (Radio & Records)	8
Canada Hot AC (Radio & Records)	5
