= The Definitive Collection (Lou Reed album) =

Compilation album by Lou Reed
- Released: August 24, 1999
- Recorded: 1972–1998
- Genre: Rock
- Length: 75:15
- Label: Arista/RCA/BMG

Lou Reed chronology
A Retrospective (1998)	The Definitive Collection (1999)	Perfect Day (1999)

Professional ratings
Review scores
Source	Rating
Allmusic	3/5 stars

The Definitive Collection is Arista's 1999 Lou Reed collection, complete with a cover photo by Mick Rock from the mid-1970s.

== Track listing ==
1. "The Blue Mask"
2. "I Wanna Be Black"
3. "Looking for Love"
4. "Coney Island Baby"
5. "Shooting Star"
6. "Romeo Had Juliette"
7. "I Want to Boogie With You"
8. "Set the Twilight Reeling"
9. "Vicious"
10. "Street Hassle: A. Waltzing Matilda, B. Street Hassle, C. Slipaway"
11. "Vicious Circle"
12. "Walk on the Wild Side"
13. "Temporary Thing"
14. "Cremation/Ashes to Ashes"
15. "The Bells"
16. "Dirty Blvd." (Live)
