= John Paul Joans =

Comedian and musical artist

- Born: Reginald John Davidge; 5 May 1930; Twerton, Somerset, England
- Died: 1 January 2011 (aged 80) Corston, Somerset
- Occupations: Comedian, singer
- Years active: 1955–1978
- Labels: RAK, Capital, Polydor

Reginald John Davidge (5 May 1930 – 1 January 2011), better known under his stage name John Paul Joans, was a British comedian active in the 1960s and 1970s, who had one top thirty single in the UK singles chart.

== Biography ==
Born in Somerset, the 6'6" tall Davidge started performing in the mid-1950s under the name Reg Gray, and appeared in the 1958 film Tom Thumb. His career struggled to the extent that he was imprisoned three times in the 1950s, once for fraud, once for stealing a pork pie worth 1s 2d (at which time he had no fixed abode), and once for trying to steal a record player in order to pay for the fare for a gig in Burnley. One probation officer said that he "did not think there was much likelihood of his getting regular work".

In 1963 he adopted the stage name John Paul Joans and his break came when he won Best Club Act award in the Granada Television talent show Firstimers in 1967 and earned a contract with Harvey Lisberg, the manager of Herman's Hermits.

=== Musical career ===
In 1970, Lisberg put Joans together with Strawberry Studios in Stockport to write a Christmas song and Joans wrote a single - "The Man From Nazareth" - with Kevin Godley, Lol Creme, and Eric Stewart, who had already had a hit as Hotlegs and would be 75% of 10cc. The song was a spoken word routine to the Hotlegs backing, in the vein of "Ringo" by Lorne Greene, and got to number 41 in the charts at the end of 1970, but a complaint from John Paul Jones of Led Zeppelin (on the basis that the American release printed his name as J.P. Jones) led to a reprinting of labels and the single lost momentum.

It did however re-enter the charts after a missing week and peaked at number 25, helped by Joans performing on Top Of The Pops on 14 January 1971, while the song was out of the charts.

Capitol Records signed up Joans and released two singles simply under the name John, but neither charted. A 1972 single in support of striking miners - by which time Joans was on the Polydor Records label - was only played twice on the British Broadcasting Corporation because of its political slant, resulting in Joans' manager - and wife - Maureen announcing that she was banning the BBC from playing it in future.

=== Stand-up comedy ===
However Joans' main career was in stand-up comedy, with topical and often controversial routines, and having a "gift for ad lib". Bob Monkhouse said he was "brilliantly bitter and hilariously tasteless...with a considerable gift for persuading the audience to adopt his very funny view of life", and has been called the first alternative comedian in Britain.

Sometime in 1955, the then Reginald John Davidge separated from his first wife, who retained custody of their two children. Joans separated from his second wife in 1975; she retained custody of their two children. Joans moved to London in 1976 and in 1977 gave up performing in order to work as a promoter for the Peace People in Belfast, organizing entertainment shows in Northern Ireland.

However, in February 1977, Joans was critically injured after being run over by a Land Rover, the effects of which altered his personality to the extent that, when visiting an ex-wife in Dewsbury after she had suffered an injury, he "snatched" his son and refused to allow him to return to his mother for 11 weeks; he was given a 6-month suspended sentence.

Joans retreated to private life and married his carer Sheila, finally receiving compensation for the car accident in 1985 and regaining his full speech capabilities in 1993. He briefly came out of retirement for charity shows in 1997. Joans died in Somerset in 2011.

== Discography ==
=== As John Paul Joans ===
- "The Man From Nazareth"/"Got To Get Together Now" (RAK RAK 107, 1970) - UK charts no. 25

=== As John ===
- "The Ten Lost Tribes Of Israel"/"Good Morning Old Man Time" (Capitol Records CL 15678, 1971)
- "Jody And The Kid"/"Colours" (Capitol CL 15701), 1971)

=== As John And City Lights ===
- "The Miners' Song"/"Colourful Man" (Polydor 2058 211, 1972)

=== As John Davidge ===
- "The Fear Of Love"/"Cold Road" (Polydor 2058 298, 1972)
