= Freeze Frame (Godley & Creme album) =

Studio album by Godley & Creme
- Released: November 1979
- Genres: Rock, new wave, art punk
- Length: 38:34
- Label: Polydor
- Producers: Kevin Godley, Lol Creme, except "Random Brainwave" and "Clues" produced by Godley, Creme and Phil Manzanera

Godley & Creme chronology
L (1978)	Freeze Frame (1979)	Ismism (1981)

Singles from Freeze Frame
- 1. "An Englishman in New York" Released: October 1979

Professional ratings
Review scores
Source	Rating
Allmusic	2.5/5 stars

Freeze Frame is the third album by Godley & Creme. The album was recorded at Nigel Gray's Surrey Sound Studios, Leatherhead, Surrey. The cover art, designed by Hipgnosis, identifies the duo as 'Godley Creme'.

== Content ==
This album made use of a couple of technical innovations which gave it a unique sound. "I Pity Inanimate Objects" contained a distinctive vocal treatment in which the notes are seemingly obtained by altering the pitch of pre-recorded voices. In an interview for The Idler magazine in 2007, Kevin Godley explained how that song was realized:

Recently, I played I Pity Inanimate Objects from Freeze Frame and I remembered how and why we actually did that. The idea was driven by a new piece of equipment called a harmoniser. It's used in studios all the time these days as a corrective device to get performances in tune, but this early version came with a keyboard. You could put a sound through a harmoniser and if you wanted an instrument or voice to hit a certain note that it hadn't, you could play that note on the keyboard. So we got to thinking, 'Let's forget about singing for the moment. What happens if I vocalize these words in a monotone - do an entire song on one note - and get Lol to play my vocal on the harmoniser keyboard?' That was the experiment. It worked pretty well. Predated Cher's digital gurglings by a few years. I don't know where the lyric came from. Maybe because the harmoniser was inanimate.

In the same interview, Godley was asked whether he and Creme used the Brian Eno/Peter Schmidt 'Oblique Strategies' chance cards:

No, we used dope. (Laughter.) Dope Strategies. There's only one card and you use it as a roach. The way we recorded the Brazilia track on Freeze Frame harked back to first year art college techniques. There was this great teacher who, in order to free up your mind, would say, 'OK, I want you to blindfold yourself, and you to tie your right arm behind your back, you stand on one leg... Now paint!' In other words, he would create obstacles for you to overcome as you did what you usually did. Painting whilst blindfolded frees you because you don't know what you are doing. What we did with Brazilia was, after we made a simple rhythm track, each of us - including Phil Manzanera - would come in independently and record something we wanted to hear. I would go in one evening to tape my vocal bits and pieces, then Lol, and then Phil, with none of us hearing what the others had done. Then we played it all back to see what happened: 'AAAARGHH! WHAAAAT?' [...] The take that's on the album is it. Obviously with things that almost worked we had to slide 'em left or right a bit or clean out of sight. It's an interesting process, the element of chance.

Some tracks also used the Gizmo, a mechanical device invented by Godley, Creme, and John McConnell (professor of physics at the University of Manchester) to give a guitar a bowed effect like a violin. The device used keys which, when pressed, allowed rotating wheels to touch the guitar strings.

== Release ==
The album was reissued in 2004 as Freeze Frame... Plus with four 1980 tracks that were originally only released on singles: "Silent Running" (the B-side of "An Englishman in New York"), non-album singles "Wide Boy" and "Submarine" and the latter's b-side "Marciano".

== Track listing ==
All tracks composed by Kevin Godley and Lol Creme

1. "An Englishman in New York" – 5:37
2. "Random Brainwave" – 2:38
3. "I Pity Inanimate Objects" – 5:24
4. "Freeze Frame" – 4:47
5. "Clues" – 5:24
6. "Brazilia (Wish You Were Here)" – 6:11
7. "Mugshots" – 3:55
8. "Get Well Soon" – 4:38

2004 Plus version and Japanese 2006 reissue bonus tracks
No.	Title	Length
9.	"Silent Running"	3:59
10.	"Wide Boy"	3:30
11.	"Submarine"	4:01
12.	"Marciano"	3:25

Note: The 1979 Polydor release of the album on vinyl, pressing no. 2442 166, contains the song "Silent Running" (4:01), appearing between tracks 3 and 4. This is listed neither on the record label, nor on the inner sleeve, nor on the cover.

== Charts ==
Chart (1980)	Peak position
Australian (Kent Music Report)	25

== Personnel ==
Credits sourced from the original album liner notes.

- Kevin Godley – lead (all but 7) and backing vocals (1, 2, 4, 7, 8), drums (2, 4–7), xylophone (1), drum machine (1), handclaps (1, 6), claves (5), percussion (2, 3, 6, 8)
- Lol Creme – lead (3, 6, 7), co-lead (1) and backing vocals (1, 2, 4, 5, 8), electric (all but 8) and acoustic guitars (2, 3, 6), bass guitar (all tracks), xylophone (5, 6), vibraphone (5), glockenspiel (5), Gizmo (2, 6, 8), piano (1, 2, 4, 6, 7), percussion (6, 8), snare drum (7), harmonica (6, 8), Eventide Harmonizer (3, 8), Fender Rhodes electric piano (4, 8), handclaps (1, 6)
- Phil Manzanera – electric (2, 5, 6) and acoustic guitars (2)
- Paul McCartney – backing vocals (8)
- Norman Smith – trumpet and tuba (1)
