= My Red Joystick =

Single by Lou Reed

from the album New Sensations
- Released: April 1984
- Studio: Skyline (New York City)
- Genre: Pop rock; new wave
- Length: 3:36
- Label: RCA
- Songwriter: Lou Reed
- Producers: John Jansen; Lou Reed

Lou Reed singles chronology
"I Love You, Suzanne" (1984)	"My Red Joystick" (1984)	"High in the City" (1984)

Music video
- "My Red Joystick" on YouTube

"My Red Joystick" is a song written and recorded by American rock musician Lou Reed, released as both a 7" and 12" single from his thirteenth solo studio album, New Sensations (1984). Following the minor success of "I Love You, Suzanne", "My Red Joystick" was released as the second single from the album however it failed to chart. Like "I Love You, Suzanne" it also had an official music video made for it, featuring the same blond woman who had featured in the aforementioned video. Reed once introduced the song in concert as his "version of James Brown", joking that it was not obvious hence why he had to inform the audience before he played it.

"My Red Joystick" is one of only two songs from the New Sensations album to feature another guitarist other than Reed playing the guitar parts, with Fernando Saunders providing rhythm guitar.

== Critical reception ==
Creem wrote, ""My Red Joystick" actually beats out [ Melanie's] "Brand New Key", [ the Who's] "Squeeze Box" and [ Chuck Berry's] "No Particular Place to Go" with some of the most hilarious sexual imagery to ever be incorporated in a rock song."

== Track listing ==
7" single (104340)

1. "My Red Joystick"
2. "Turn to Me"

12" maxi single (PC 3928)

1. "My Red Joystick (Remixed Version)"
2. *Remix by Francois Kevorkian and Jay Mark
3. "My Red Joystick (Instrumental Version)"
4. *Remix by Francois Kevorkian and Jay Mark
5. "I Love You, Suzanne"
