= Rob Jungklas =

- Origin: Memphis, Tennessee
- Genres: Rock, Blues
- Occupations: Singer, Musician, Teacher
- Instruments: Vocals, Guitar
- Years active: 1970s–1989, 2001–present
- Labels: Madjack Records
- Website: http://robjungklas.bandcamp.com/

Rob Jungklas is an American, Memphis, Tennessee-based musician, singer and songwriter.

Jungklas worked in the Memphis-based music circuit for 15 years before signing a deal with Manhattan Records and releasing the album Closer to the Flame in 1986. The album made it to #102 on the Billboard 200 in 1986. The album contained the minor hit "Make It Mean Something," which reached #86 on the Billboard Hot 100. Another song, "Boystown," had a video directed by Godley & Creme (in the same rapid-jump-cut style of their video for Wang Chung's "Everybody Have Fun Tonight"). "Hello Heaven," another song on the album, appeared on the soundtrack of the 1987 movie The Principal.

Jungklas recorded a second album with Manhattan that was not released; Jungklas later released the album through his own website under the title Wrestle With Angels. He then moved to RCA Records, where his album Work Songs for a New Moon was released in 1989. The album was not a commercial success, and he left the label.

Jungklas then left the music business, continuing to record music independently. He married, earned a college degree and got a job teaching English and science at the Hutchison School in Memphis. He later moved to St. George's Independent School in Collierville, Tennessee to work as a 7th grade science teacher.

Jungklas returned to the industry in 2001, and released the album Arkadelphia in 2003 on Memphis-based label Madjack Records. Its blues-based sound was a major departure from his rock-oriented 1980s releases. Jungklas played several shows opening for Lucinda Williams in support of the album. On Madjack Records, Jungklas released another blues-based album, Gully, in 2007, followed by Mapping the Wreckage, The Spirit and the Spine, and Blackbirds. He has since returned to releasing music independently, the latest being December (2025).

Jungklas said that while he's proud of his pop-oriented work in the 1980s, "in my mind, I'm really a blues artist ... folk and blues. People might roll their eyes when I say that. But in my head, that's what it is."

== Discography ==
- Romeos (1983)
- Closer to the Flame (1986)
- Wrestle with Angels (1989)
- Work Songs for a New Moon (1989)
- Overcome by the Call of the Wild (1991)
- Where The Earth Meets The Sky (1993)
- Don Juan Triumphant (1994)
- Arkadelphia (2003)
- Gully (2007)
- Mapping the Wreckage (2010)
- The Spirit And The Spine (2013)
- Nothing to Fade (2014)
- 7 Sisters (2015)
- Blackbirds (2017)
- Rebel Souls (2022)
- Love Songs for the Dying of the Light (2023)
- December (2025)
