= Goodbye Blue Sky (album) =

1988 studio album by Godley & Creme

Studio album by Godley & Creme
- Released: 7 March 1988
- Recorded: 1988
- Genre: Rock
- Length: 44:12
- Label: Polydor
- Producers: Kevin Godley; Lol Creme

Godley & Creme chronology
The History Mix Volume 1 (1985)	Goodbye Blue Sky (1988)

Professional ratings
Review scores
Source	Rating
AllMusic	2.5/5 stars

Goodbye Blue Sky is the seventh and final studio album by Godley & Creme, released on 7 March 1988 by Polydor Records.

The album generated two singles, "A Little Piece of Heaven" (a top 30 hit in several countries across Europe) and "10,000 Angels", which featured a number of non-album B-sides.

The album featured backing vocals by three future members of 1990s dance band Londonbeat.

== Making of ==
The album makes use of harmonicas substantially on most tracks.

In a 1988 interview with Pulse! magazine, they said:

We also decided to use other musicians on the album for the first time ever, to get back to a real live band feel, and that's when we started auditioning harp players," adds Godley. "And to our surprise, we found that there's a huge range - everything from bass to treble - but that traditionally harmonicas are always played as solo instruments. They're never played in groups."

"So naturally we thought, 'Why not use a harmonica section?"' Creme continues. "And after auditioning a bunch of players, none of whom had ever played with another harp player, we finally selected two guys - Mark Felton (sic) and Mitt Gamon -and began laying down rhythm tracks at my home studio.

"Next, we brought in three black backup singers - George Chandler, Jimmy Helms and Jimmy Chambers - whom we'd met on the Paul Young video, and started building up the tracks. The interesting thing is that the more we got into the sounds, the more we began re-writing the songs to suit the singers or the harp players.

== Track listing ==
All songs composed by Kevin Godley and Lol Creme

1. "H.E.A.V.E.N. / A Little Piece of Heaven" – 5:06
2. "Don't Set Fire (To the One I Love)" – 3:27
3. "Golden Rings" – 4:17
4. "Crime & Punishment" – 7:22
5. "The Big Bang" – 2:32
6. "10,000 Angels" – 5:16
7. "Sweet Memory" – 4:50
8. "Airforce One" – 3:40
9. "The Last Page of History" – 4:01
10. "Desperate Times" – 3:41

Japanese 2006 reissue bonus tracks
No.	Title	Length
11.	"A Little Piece Of Heaven (Extended Mix)"	6:08
12.	"Bits Of Blue Sky"	5:46
13.	"Hidden Heartbeat"	4:31
14.	"Rhino Rhino"	3:20
15.	"Can't Sleep"	2:08

== Personnel ==
- Lol Creme – guitar, bass, keyboard & vocals
- Kevin Godley – drums, percussion, vocals
- Mark Feltham – harmonica
- Mitt Gamon – harmonica
- Jimmy Chambers – backup vocals
- George Chandler – backup vocals
- Jimmy Helms – backup vocals
- Richard Evans – cover design
