= Birds of Prey (Godley & Creme album) =

Studio album by Godley & Creme
- Released: 5 April 1983
- Studio: Lymehouse (Leatherhead)
- Genres: Electronic; rock
- Length: 37:16
- Label: Polydor
- Producers: Kevin Godley; Lol Creme

Godley & Creme chronology
Ismism (1981)	Birds of Prey (1983)	The History Mix Volume 1 (1985)

Singles from Birds of Prey
- 1. "Save a Mountain for Me" Released: 24 September 1982; 2. "Samson" Released: 31 March 1983

Birds of Prey is the fifth studio album by the English duo Godley & Creme, released on 5 April 1983 by Polydor Records. It was recorded at Lymehouse Studios in Leatherhead, Surrey and engineered and re-mixed at Nigel Gray's Surrey Sound Studios.

Despite the success of their previous studio album Ismism (1981), Birds of Prey failed to chart, and was their only album not to have charted anywhere. Two singles were released from the album: "Save a Mountain for Me" and "Samson", both of which also failed to chart.

== Release ==
The album was reissued in 2004 as Birds of Prey... Plus with "Welcome to Breakfast Television" (B-side to "Save a Mountain for Me"), "Samson (Dance Mix)" and non-album single "Golden Boy" as bonus tracks.

== Critical reception ==
Professional ratings
Review scores
Source	Rating
AllMusic	2.5/5 stars
The Virgin Encyclopedia of Eighties Music	2/5 stars

In a retrospective review for AllMusic, critic Dave Thompson deemed the album "the least successful inclusion in the Godley & Creme catalog", and called it "a major disappointment".

== Track listing ==
All tracks are written by Kevin Godley and Lol Creme.

Side one
No.	Title	Length
1.	"My Body the Car"	2:25
2.	"Worm and the Rattlesnake"	3:23
3.	"Cats Eyes"	3:44
4.	"Samson"	5:29
5.	"Save a Mountain for Me"	3:36

Side two
No.	Title	Length
6.	"Madame Guillotine"	5:04
7.	"Woodwork"	4:39
8.	"Twisted Nerve"	4:03
9.	"Out in the Cold"	4:53
Total length:		37:16

2004 Plus version and Japanese 2006 reissue bonus tracks
No.	Title	Length
10.	"Welcome to Breakfast Television"	2:31
11.	"Samson (Dance Mix)"	5:52
12.	"Golden Boy"	3:49

Additional bonus tracks on the 2006 Japanese reissue
No.	Title	Length
13.	"Samson (UK 7" Promo Single Edit)"	3:58
14.	"Golden Boy (Long Version)"	5:52

== Personnel ==
- Kevin Godley
- Lol Creme
- Guy Barker – trumpet on "Save a Mountain for Me"
