= A Retrospective (Lou Reed album) =

Compilation album by Lou Reed
- Released: June 30, 1998
- Genre: Rock
- Label: RCA Records

Lou Reed chronology
Perfect Night: Live in London (1998)	A Retrospective (1998)	The Definitive Collection (1999)

A Retrospective is a European Lou Reed compilation.

== Track listing ==
1. "I Can't Stand It"
2. "Walk on the Wild Side"
3. "Satellite of Love"
4. "Vicious"
5. "Caroline Says I"
6. "Sweet Jane" [Live]
7. "Kill Your Sons"
8. "Coney Island Baby"
9. "Nowhere at All"
10. "Blue Mask"
11. "Legendary Hearts"
12. "My Red Joystick"
13. "Original Wrapper"
14. "Video Violence"

== Reception ==
All music rated it 2.5 out of 5.

Professional ratings
Review scores
Source	Rating
AllMusic	2.5/5 stars
