= Charms (The Philosopher Kings song) =

1995 song by The Philosopher Kings

Single by The Philosopher Kings

from the album The Philosopher Kings
- Released: March 1995
- Genre: R&B, pop
- Length: 4:47
- Label: Columbia
- Songwriter: The Philosopher Kings
- Producers: Lenny DeRose, The Philosopher Kings, Mike Roth

The Philosopher Kings singles chronology
"Turn My Head Around" (1994)	"Charms" (1995)	"Lay My Body Down" (1996)

Music video
- "Charms" on YouTube

"Charms" is a song by Canadian pop rock group the Philosopher Kings. Released in March 1995 as the second single from their self-titled debut album it reached number 16 in Canada and peaked at number 36 on the US Mainstream Top 40.

Lenny DeRose won the Juno Award for Best Recording Engineer at the Juno Awards of 1995 for his work on "Charms" and "Lay My Body Down".

A dance remix of the song by the Boomtang Boys was also released.

== Charts ==
Chart (1995)	Peak position
Canada Top Singles (RPM)	16
Canada Dance/Urban (RPM)	15
US Pop Airplay (Billboard)	36
