= New Sensations =

Studio album by Lou Reed
- Released: April 30, 1984
- Studio: Skyline (New York City)
- Genres: New wave; rock; pop rock
- Length: 42:24
- Label: RCA Victor
- Producers: John Jansen; Lou Reed

Lou Reed chronology
| Live in Italy (1984) | New Sensations (1984) | City Lights (1985) |

Lou Reed studio album chronology
| Legendary Hearts (1983) | New Sensations (1984) | Mistrial (1986) |

Singles from New Sensations
- 1. "My Red Joystick" Released: April 1984; 2. "I Love You, Suzanne" Released: May 1984; 3. "High in the City" Released: August 1984 (NL)

New Sensations is the thirteenth solo studio album by American rock musician Lou Reed, released on April 30, 1984, by RCA Records. John Jansen and Reed produced the album. New Sensations peaked at No. 56 on the U.S. Billboard 200 and at No. 92 on the UK Albums Chart. This marked the first time that Reed charted within the US Top 100 since his eighth solo studio album Street Hassle (1978), and the first time that Reed had charted in the UK since his sixth solo studio album Coney Island Baby (1976). Three singles were released from the album: "I Love You, Suzanne", "My Red Joystick" and "High in the City", with "I Love You, Suzanne" being the only single to chart, peaking at No. 78 on the UK Singles Chart. The music video for "I Love You, Suzanne" did, however, receive light rotation on MTV.

"Open Invitation", an unreleased song from the album's recording sessions in late 1983, was released online in March 2023.

== Robert Quine's involvement ==
Guitarist Robert Quine, who had played on Reed's previous two studio albums, The Blue Mask (1982) and Legendary Hearts (1983), had had a falling-out with Reed during the recording sessions, so Reed opted to play most of the guitar parts on the album himself, with the exceptions being "My Red Joystick" and "My Friend George", which feature Fernando Saunders providing rhythm guitar. Years after the album's release, Saunders claimed that one of the issues during recording was that Quine had composed the "guitar riff" for "I Love You, Suzanne" in the studio while the band was rehearsing. Upon hearing Quine's riff, Reed had written the lyrics to the song, but he had failed to give Quine a co-writing credit for the song in the album credits, thus cutting Quine out of royalties which added further strain to their relationship. Despite their falling out, Quine later joined Reed for the world tour in support of the album.

== Critical reception ==
Professional ratings
Review scores
| Source | Rating |
|---|---|
| AllMusic | 4.5/5 stars |
| The Boston Phoenix | 3.5/4 stars |
| Chicago Tribune | 3.5/4 stars |
| Pitchfork | 5.8/10 |
| Record Collector | 3/5 stars |
| Record Mirror | 3/5 stars |
| Rolling Stone | 4/5 stars |
| The Rolling Stone Album Guide | 4/5 stars |
| Spin Alternative Record Guide | 8/10 |
| The Village Voice | A |

Upon release, New Sensations received favorable reviews from music critics. Writing for The Village Voice, music journalist Robert Christgau stated that "instead of straining fruitlessly to top himself, Reed has settled into a pattern as satisfying as what he had going with the Velvets, though by definition it isn't as epochal. The music is simple and inevitable, and even the sarcastic songs are good sarcastic songs". In Rolling Stone, Kurt Loder called it "a long-overdue delight that's all the more exciting for being completely unexpected."

Robert Palmer of The New York Times praised New Sensations, along with Reed's preceding studio albums The Blue Mask and Legendary Hearts, as "uniformly splendid, ranking with the very best of [Reed's] earlier solo work."

Ira Robbins of Trouser Press addressed Reed's decision to play all the guitar parts himself, describing the result as "anything but self-indulgent. Forsaking the two-guitar sound just throws Saunders' distinctive fretless bass playing and Reed's spare arrangements into higher relief, and they merit the attention – as do the songs, which prove that a middle-aged rock songwriter can have plenty to offer."

New Sensations would later place ninth in The Village Voice's annual Pazz & Jop critics' poll.

Ann Powers described the album as a "New Wave crossover hit". In a retrospective review for AllMusic, critic Mark Deming described the album as "a set of straight-ahead rock & roll" and a pop rock album. And said that "New Sensations showed that Reed had a lot more warmth and humanity than he was given credit for, and made clear that he could 'write happy' when he felt like, with all the impact of his 'serious' material."

== Track listing ==
All tracks are written by Lou Reed.

Side one
| No. | Title | Length |
|---|---|---|
| 1. | "I Love You, Suzanne" | 3:19 |
| 2. | "Endlessly Jealous" | 3:57 |
| 3. | "My Red Joystick" | 3:36 |
| 4. | "Turn to Me" | 4:22 |
| 5. | "New Sensations" | 5:42 |

Side two
| No. | Title | Length |
|---|---|---|
| 6. | "Doin' the Things That We Want To" | 3:55 |
| 7. | "What Becomes a Legend Most" | 3:37 |
| 8. | "Fly into the Sun" | 3:04 |
| 9. | "My Friend George" | 3:51 |
| 10. | "High in the City" | 3:27 |
| 11. | "Down at the Arcade" | 3:40 |
| Total length: | | 42:24 |

== Personnel ==
Credits are adapted from the New Sensations liner notes.

Musicians

- Lou Reed – vocals; lead and rhythm guitar
- Fernando Saunders – electric and string bass; backing vocals; rhythm guitar on "My Red Joystick" and "My Friend George"
- Fred Maher – drums
- Peter Wood – piano; synthesizers; accordion
- Lakshminarayana Shankar – electric violin
- Michael Brecker – tenor saxophone
- Randy Brecker – trumpet
- Jon Faddis – trumpet
- Tom Malone – trombone; horn arrangement
- Jocelyn Brown – backing vocals
- Rory Dodd – backing vocals
- Connie Harvey – backing vocals
- Eric Troyer – backing vocals

Production and artwork

- John Jansen – producer
- Lou Reed – producer
- Dan Nash – assistant engineer
- Roger Moutenot – assistant engineer
- Greg Calbi – mastering
- Waring Abbott – photography; art direction

== Charts ==
| Chart (1984) | Peak position |
|---|---|
| Australian Albums (Kent Music Report) | 56 |
| Dutch Album Chart | 43 |
| UK Albums Chart | 92 |
| US Billboard 200 | 56 |
| Swedish Albums (Sverigetopplistan) | 30 |
| New Zealand Albums (RMNZ) | 25 |

== See also ==
- List of albums released in 1984
- Lou Reed's discography
