= Thinks: School Stinks =

Studio album by Hotlegs
- Released: March 1971
- Recorded: 1970
- Studio: Strawberry Studios, Stockport, Cheshire, England
- Genre: Rock
- Length: 44:20
- Label: Philips
- Producer: Hotlegs

Hotlegs chronology
Thinks: School Stinks (1971)	You Didn't Like It Because You Didn't Think of It (1976)

Singles from Thinks: School Stinks
- 1. "Neanderthal Man" b/w "You Didn't Like It, Because You Didn't Think Of It" Released: June 19, 1970; 2. "Run Baby Run" b/w "How Many Times" Released: 1971; 3. "Desperate Dan" b/w "Run Baby Run" Released: 1971

Alternative cover
- UK cover of Song

Thinks: School Stinks (later retitled and reconfigured as Song) is the only studio album by English pop band Hotlegs - which consisted of future 10cc members Kevin Godley, Lol Creme, and Eric Stewart. Graham Gouldman played bass with the three others on one track, "Today". The album, featuring the band's hit single "Neanderthal Man", was recorded at Strawberry Studios in Stockport near Manchester and engineered by the studio's co-owners, Eric Stewart and Peter Tattersall.

== Overview ==
Kevin Godley, in a 1976 interview, said the album included the songs and ideas that he and Lol Creme had intended recording in 1969 with entrepreneur Giorgio Gomelsky. Gomelsky had named the duo Frabjoy and Runcible Spoon, wanting to fashion them in the style of Simon and Garfunkel. "I still say that was a bloody good album," Godley said. "Most of the tracks were from the Frabjoy period and it's an interesting LP."

"Fly Away" had earlier been released on a Marmalade record label sampler, 100 Proof as "To Fly Away", credited to Godley, while the song "Today" from the later edition of the album was the first song to be recorded by all future members of 10cc as a band: the trio of Hotlegs were assisted by Graham Gouldman. The opening lines and percussive rhythm of "Run Baby Run" were later reworked to become the basis for "Art for Art's Sake" on the 10cc album How Dare You!.

== Cover art ==
The cover, designed by Kevin Godley and Lol Creme, depicted a scratched school desk, a concept that was repeated two years later by Alice Cooper for their album School's Out. However, the album was released in some countries with an alternative cover.

== Release and reception ==
The album and the accompanying US single, "Run Baby Run", were released nine months after the release of "Neanderthal Man", a gap that the band later regretted.

The album and follow-up single failed to chart and, in December 1971, the band decided to issue a repackaged version of the album under the title Song, with alternate tracklisting, and replacing "Neanderthal Man" and "Desperate Dan" with "Today" and "The Loser", the former being a re-recording of a song by Kevin Godley and Lol Creme from 1969, under the band name of Frabjoy and the Runcible Spoon the latter being the B-side of "Lady Sadie" non-album single. "Lady Sadie" itself was released ahead of the repackage in September 1971.

A compilation of all the Hotlegs tracks based on Thinks: School Stinks, titled You Didn't Like It Because You Didn't Think of It, was released in 1976.

Stewart, interviewed in 1976, said: Thinks: School Stinks had presented a problem because it was so different from "Neanderthal Man": "It was totally alien to what people were expecting from us. It was a good record, a little ahead of its time. It was similar to the things we are doing now. It was very melodic with chord structures that hadn't been used before – and some of the sounds that we used on that album hadn't been heard at the time."

Thinks: School Stinks was reissued on CD in 1994 by One Way Records.

== Track listing ==
1. "Neanderthal Man" (Kevin Godley, Lol Creme, Eric Stewart) – 4:19
2. "How Many Times" (Godley, Creme, Stewart) – 3:57
3. "Desperate Dan" (Godley, Creme, Stewart) – 2:12
4. "Take Me Back" (Godley, Creme) – 5:01
5. "Um Wah, Um Woh" (Godley, Creme, Stewart) – 5:30
6. "Suite F.A." (Godley, Creme) – 12:53
  - 1st Movement – On My Way
  - 2nd Movement – Indecision
  - 3rd Movement – The Return
7. "Fly Away" (Godley, Creme) – 2:43
8. "Run Baby Run" (Godley, Creme, Stewart) – 2:50
9. "All God's Children" (Godley, Creme, Stewart) – 3:55

=== Song Track listing ===
1. "Today" (Kevin Godley, Lol Creme) – 4:04
2. "Um Wah, Um Woh" (Godley, Creme, Stewart) – 5:30
3. "Run Baby Run" (Godley, Creme, Stewart) – 2:50
4. "How Many Times" (Godley, Creme, Stewart) – 3:57
5. "The Loser" (Godley, Creme, Stewart) – 3:39
6. "Take Me Back" (Godley, Creme) – 5:01
7. "Fly Away" (Godley, Creme) – 2:43
8. "All God's Children" (Godley, Creme, Stewart) – 3:55
9. "Suite F.A." (Godley, Creme) – 12:53
  - 1st Movement – On My Way
  - 2nd Movement – Indecision
  - 3rd Movement – The Return

== Personnel ==
Hotlegs

- Lol Creme – guitar, bass, vocals, keyboards, arranger
- Eric Stewart – guitar, bass, vocals, arranger, engineer
- Kevin Godley – drums, vocals, arranger

Additional personnel

- Peter Tattersall – left-handed boogey piano ("Desperate Dan"), engineer
- Mike Timoney – organ ("Take Me Back", "Today")
- Rod Morton – on-beat tambourine ("Desperate Dan")
- Baz Barker – violin ("How Many Times")
- Graham Gouldman – bass ("Today")
- Tony Harrison – string arrangement ("Today")
- Ian Brookes – trumpet
- Mike Bell – saxophone
- Cheadle Hulme High School Choir (Arranged and Conducted by Brian Day) – vocals ("Suite F.A.")
