= Under Your Thumb =

Single by Godley & Creme

from the album Ismism
- B-side: "Power Behind the Throne"
- Released: 31 August 1981
- Recorded: 1980
- Studio: Lymehouse Studio (Leatherhead, Surrey)
- Genre: Synth-pop; new wave
- Length: 3:40
- Label: Polydor
- Songwriters: Godley & Creme
- Producers: Godley & Creme

Godley & Creme singles chronology
"Wide Boy" (1980)	"Under Your Thumb" (1981)	"Wedding Bells" (1981)

"Under Your Thumb" is a song written and recorded by the English duo Godley & Creme, released on 31 August 1981 by Polydor Records as the lead single from their fourth studio album, Ismism (1981). The song tells the story of a man who boards a dirty, run-down train carriage to get out of the rain, and is followed on board by a woman who repeatedly cries "Don't wanna be under your thumb forever." To distract himself from her voice, the man picks up an old newspaper that he finds, only to see her photograph beneath the headline, "Woman throws herself from speeding train, identity unknown".

The single, edited from the album version, peaked at No. 3 on the UK singles chart in October 1981. The single features the non-album track "Power Behind the Throne" as its B-side.

== Charts ==
Chart	Position
Australia (Kent Music Report)	94
Belgium (Ultratop 50 Flanders)	32
Ireland (IRMA)	7
Netherlands (Dutch Top 40)	13
UK Singles (OCC)	3
