= The Original Wrapper =

Single by Lou Reed

from the album Mistrial
- Released: April 1986
- Recorded: 1986
- Genre: Pop rock; new wave; hip-hop
- Length: 3:37
- Label: RCA
- Songwriter: Lou Reed
- Producers: Lou Reed; Fernando Saunders

Lou Reed singles chronology
"September Song" (1985)	"The Original Wrapper" (1986)	"No Money Down" (1986)

Music video
- "The Original Wrapper” on YouTube

"The Original Wrapper" (sometimes written as "The Original Rapper") is a song written and recorded by American rock musician Lou Reed from his fourteenth solo studio album, Mistrial (1986). The title refers to the practice of keeping products in their original packaging. It can also be interpreted as a pun on "rapper", referring to Reed's distinctive vocal style.

== Music video ==
The 1986 music video (directed by Polish filmmaker Zbigniew Rybczyński) features time-lapse photography of New Yorkers on the street. A trio of men in yellow hazmat suits attempt to package people in "original wrappers" of cardboard. Shots of Reed are interspersed, wearing a fedora and an overabundance of glitter (most likely a reference to Michael Jackson). Rollerskaters and fireworks are mixed within scenes of the hazmat men capturing men and women. They attempt to capture a dachshund, but it escapes its box. It was nominated for Best Editing at the 1987 MTV Video Music Awards.

== Track listing ==
- LP 12"
1. "The Original Wrapper" (Extended Version)
2. "The Original Wrapper" (Remix Single Version)
3. "The Original Wrapper" (Dub Version)
4. "Video Violence" (Remix Version)

== See also ==
- "Funky Man"
