= Consequences (Godley & Creme album) =

Studio album by Godley & Creme
- Released: 17 October 1977
- Recorded: Strawberry Studios, Stockport, England, and The_Manor_Studio, Shipton-on-Cherwell, Oxfordshire, England.
- Genres: Avant-pop; art rock; progressive rock
- Length: 110:59
- Label: Mercury
- Producers: Kevin Godley, Lol Creme

Godley & Creme chronology
Consequences (1977)	L (1978)

Singles from Consequences
- 1. "Five O'Clock in the Morning" / "The Flood" Released: 2 December 1977

Consequences is the debut studio album by the English pop artists Godley & Creme. It was released in 1977 as a boxed triple-LP.

Created as a concept album, it incorporates a play, with all characters voiced by comedian Peter Cook, and singing by Sarah Vaughan, who was brought into the project by Phonogram after trying to secure Ella Fitzgerald.

The album was released in two abbreviated, single-album versions: an eight-track album, Musical Excerpts from Consequences (1977) and a 10-track album, Music from Consequences (1979). A single was also released, "Five O'clock in the Morning" / "The Flood".

The concept of the album was described at the time as "the story of man's last defence against an irate nature".

== Production ==
The album began as a demonstration record for the 'Gizmotron', or Gizmo. This was an electric guitar effect device that Godley and Creme had invented a few years earlier as a means of providing orchestral textures, because the band at that stage could not afford to hire orchestral players to augment their recordings. The Gizmo was an electro-mechanical device which was clamped over the bridge of an electric guitar; it contained six small motor-driven toothed plastic wheels that, when pushed into contact with the strings, created a 'bowing' effect, producing notes and chords with endless sustain that, with additional audio effects treatment and overdubbing, could emulate violins, violas, cellos and basses. Godley and Creme had begun work on songs for the Gizmo before leaving 10cc, but quit the band when they realised the songs could not comfortably appear on 10cc albums.

The album was recorded over 18 months at Strawberry Studios in Stockport and The Manor in Shipton-on-Cherwell, Oxfordshire, with Godley, Creme and engineer Martin Lawrence going to extraordinary lengths to create its special effects. At one point, to create the impression that the listener is inside a coffin during a burial, a binaural "head" microphone unit was placed behind a board at the foot of a flight of stairs, while Godley shovelled sand on to it. Three days were spent producing a saxophone sound from an electric guitar; each note of a guitar solo was recorded separately and faded in on the track, which was then sent through a speaker and out of a rubber hose with perforated cigarette paper at the end. Enough pressure was displaced by forcing the sound through the holes of the cigarette paper to give the rasp of a saxophone.

== The plot ==
A website devoted to the album explains that the main action of the play takes place in the office of the increasingly drunken solicitor Mr. Haig; he is negotiating the divorce between Walter Stapleton and his French wife Lulu, represented by Mr. Pepperman. They are continually interrupted by Mr. Blint, an eccentric composer, who lives below; when the building was redeveloped he was the only tenant who refused to sell and a hole remains in Mr. Haig's floor which is, technically, Blint's attic; it is through this hole that Blint addresses them; however, Blint can also be heard entering and leaving the office by way of an elevator.

The litigants are unaware that larger forces are at work; the world is being threatened by a meteorological disaster. Weather is possibly being used as a weapon in a global war, and eventually it dawns on them that only Mr. Blint can save them, with his arcane knowledge of pyramids, music and the number 17.

== Critical reaction ==
Professional ratings
Review scores
Source	Rating
AllMusic	1.5/5 stars
Christgau's Record Guide	C

The album was first played to the Phonogram/Mercury Records sales force at an elaborate presentation in a domed 17th-century church in Amsterdam, the Netherlands, with a Scottish MC (Phonogram MD Ken Maliphant) declaring: "You may like it, you may loathe it, but you can't afford to ignore... Consequences!".

An account of the Amsterdam presentation observed:

Sounding like a cross between 10cc, Monty Python, middle period Moody Blues and the least linear moments of the Firesign Theatre, the record demands being listened to, but then, if the response of the sales team was any indication, refuses to give up much in return. Bees buzz, Negroes hum the blooze, Peter Cook, the British comedian, adds long segments of what one supposes to be comedy, and then the Gizmo launches into action, impressive, but lacking any direction. Twenty minutes into the presentation, heads began dropping on breastbones and the (unintentionally) funniest moment of the record occurred when snoring came from the speakers as eyes closed around the room. Already there was a cloying sense that though the disc would go on, things would not improve. Consequences was barely interesting then only as a display of the capabilities of Gizmo, which sat before the listeners in a glass case on presumptuous black velvet.

Godley has since admitted the pair realised even before its release that the album would be a commercial flop, because of the sudden popularity of punk rock:

"There was a seismic, paradigm shift. I knew we were doomed. We emerged blinking into the light, and everyone was wearing safety pins and bondage trousers. We'd been working on a semi-avant-garde orchestral triple album with a very drunk Peter Cook and me singing with Sarah Vaughan, while outside it was like a nuclear bomb had dropped."

Thirty years after the album's release Godley was still conceding the project was flawed. He told the ProGGnosis website:

"Most critics of the project call it indulgent. There's truth in that, but I believe it was big and long not because we were simply indulgent but because we were lost. After sides one and two the tail was wagging the dog a bit and we kept going in the hope it would eventually make sense to both us and a rather anxious record label. The label, for their part, was very supportive and kept pumping money into session time, but in the end it was like uppers into Judy Garland, a law of diminishing returns. More significantly our world gradually reduced to a series of small, dark, womb-like spaces and we became studio lifers scared of emerging into the real world.

"Regardless of the finished product we just didn't want it to stop. The result is a weird mix of sheer brilliance and utter shit. I could be wrong. It may be all brilliant or all shit or even all brilliant shit. Either way it fried our/my brains for a while and is impossible to be objective about."

In a 1997 interview Creme claimed he was not fazed by the hostile critical reaction to the album; Godley, though, had been deeply affected:

"Kevin was heartbroken, I don't think he's got over it yet. He was really, really upset about the way it was received, like a big turkey, really. I didn't take it the way Kevin did, to be honest, because I loved doing it so much and I learned so much, got so much out of it, a totally selfish thing, I didn't give a shit, I really didn't. And I never have, to me it's the doing of something that's the vibe, it's not necessarily the result. It's always a bonus if what you do does well, but it's not that precious, you know. I've always thought like that. And I could see why it was laughed at, it does look like a pretentious pile of old stuff. We were self-indulgent pop stars, there's no question about it."

Writing in Record Mirror reviewer Jim Evans described it as "a masterpiece".

== Other media ==
A podcast starting April 15, 2019 revisits Consequences with interviews and background stories on the conception and reception of the production.

The hosts, Sean McCreavy and Paul McNulty have interviewed most people involved with Godley & Creme and their former band 10cc in its various incarnations, including Godley, Graham Gouldman, Paul Burgess, Rick Fenn, Stuart Tosh, all musicians in the band, as well as industry notables including manager Harvey Lisberg.

The "tank" photo from the Consequences booklet was used as the cover of the Chemical Brothers' 2019 album No Geography.

== Track listing ==
Side A

1. "Seascape" – 2:51
2. "Wind" – 3:54
3. "Fireworks" – 1:00
4. "Stampede" – 6:14
5. "Burial Scene" – 3:07

Side B

1. "Sleeping Earth" – 6:42
2. "Honolulu Lulu" – 3:20
3. "The Flood" – 7:55

Side C

1. "Five O'Clock in the Morning" – 3:53
2. "Dialogue" – 4:05
3. "When Things Go Wrong" – 3:42
4. "Dialogue" – 6:40
5. "Lost Weekend" – 4:50

Side D

1. "Dialogue" – 6:25
2. "Rosie" – 3:07
3. "Dialogue" – 1:06
4. "Office Chase" – 2:34
5. "Dialogue" – 4:17
6. "Cool, Cool, Cool" – 2:53
7. "Dialogue" – 0:07

Side E

1. "Cool, Cool, Cool (Reprise)" – 0:30
2. "Dialogue" – 0:47
3. "Sailor" – 2:10
4. "Dialogue" – 5:10
5. "Mobilization" – 1:45
6. "Dialogue" – 2:12
7. "Please, Please, Please" – 1:57
8. "Dialogue" – 5:49

Side F

1. "Blint's Tune — Movements 1-17" – 14:17

== Track listing Music from Consequences version ==
Side A

1. "Five O'Clock in the Morning" – 3:53
2. "When Things Go Wrong" – 3:42
3. "Lost Weekend" – 4:50
4. "Cool, Cool, Cool" – 2:53
5. "Sailor" – 2:10
6. "Rosie" – 3:07

Side B

1. "Sleeping Earth" – 6:42
2. "Honolulu Lulu" – 3:20
3. "The Flood" – 7:55
4. "Burial Scene" – 3:07
