= Hotlegs =

English band (1970–1972)

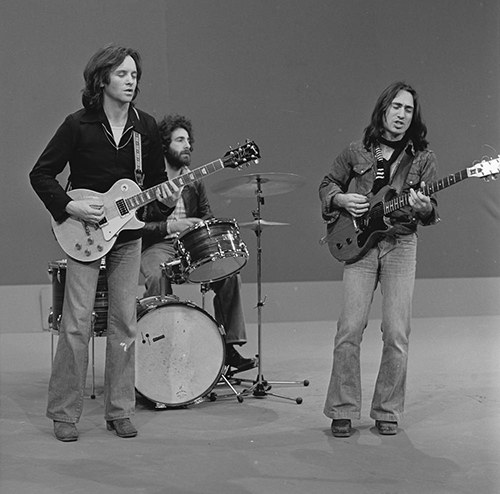
- Eric Stewart, Kevin Godley and Lol Creme (performing as 10cc in 1974)

Background information
- Also known as: Doctor Father
- Years active: 1970–1972
- Label: Philips
- Spinoffs: 10cc
- Spinoff of: The Mindbenders
- Past members: Eric Stewart; Kevin Godley; Lol Creme; Graham Gouldman

Hotlegs (very briefly Doctor Father) was a short-lived English band best known for their hit single "Neanderthal Man" in 1970. The band consisted of Eric Stewart, Kevin Godley, Lol Creme and – briefly – Graham Gouldman. In 1972, the band re-branded themselves as 10cc.

== Premise ==
Stewart had earlier enjoyed success as a member of the 1960s pop band The Mindbenders and had delivered the vocals for that band's best-known track, "A Groovy Kind of Love". The Mindbenders disbanded in November 1968 and Stewart teamed with Peter Tattersall, a former road manager for Billy J. Kramer and the Dakotas, and Gouldman, a fellow Mindbender and successful songwriter, to become joint owners of a Stockport recording studio which in 1969 was renamed Strawberry Studios.

Stewart and Gouldman enlisted Godley and Creme, longtime friends of Gouldman who had earlier launched an abortive career under entrepreneur Giorgio Gomelsky as duo Frabjoy and Runcible Spoon, and the team gained work writing and performing bubblegum songs under a variety of band names for US producers writer-producers Jerry Kasenetz and Jeffry Katz of Super K Productions, as well as other session work.

== History ==
=== "Neanderthal Man" and Thinks: School Stinks ===
"Neanderthal Man" was created by the trio of Stewart, Godley and Creme as they dabbled with newly installed recording equipment at Strawberry Studios, perfecting drum layering on a four-track machine. (At that time, Gouldman was in New York City working out the final six months of his contract with Super K Productions.)

The song consisted primarily of a chanted chorus backed by Stewart's and Creme's acoustic guitars and a lumbering drum rhythm provided by Godley. The song was released as a single under the moniker Hotlegs and reached No.2 in the UK Singles Chart in July 1970 and No. 22 in the US, ultimately selling two million copies worldwide. The band recorded a follow-up album, Thinks: School Stinks, for Philips, which was released in March 1971.

=== Doctor Father ===
Before the release of Thinks: School Stinks, Hotlegs rebranded themselves as Doctor Father in August 1970 for the release of a single, "Umbopo" (backed with "Roll On"), on the Pye Records label.

"Umbopo" was written by Godley and Creme, produced by Creme and featured Godley on lead vocals. Released on Pye, it was an expanded reworking of "There Ain't No Umbopo", a song the trio had recorded in 1969 under the guise of American bubblegum pop group Crazy Elephant. That song had emerged from an intense three-month period at Strawberry Studios in Stockport, near Manchester, writing and performing songs for American hitmakers Jerry Kasenetz and Jeffry Katz of Super K Productions.

Despite regular airplay on Radio Northsea, "Umbopo" did not appear on the British charts and was the sole release by Doctor Father. A brief sample of the song was included on The History Mix Volume 1 by Godley & Creme in 1985, while the full version – along with the shorter Crazy Elephant version – appeared on the 2003 Castle Music collection Strawberry Bubblegum: A Collection of Pre-10CC Strawberry Studio Recordings 1969–1972.

The decision to create a new band name for the release of "Umbopo" was consistent with the trio's operating procedure of the previous year: working with Kasenetz, Katz and Manchester songwriter Graham Gouldman, they had recorded a large number of songs under names including Silver Fleet, Fighter Squadron and Festival. Creme later recalled: "Singles kept coming out under strange names that had really been recorded by us. I've no idea how many there were, or what happened to them all." After "Umbopo", the band reverted to Hotlegs.

=== Chart failures and rebranding as 10cc ===
In October 1970 the band was invited to tour Britain with The Moody Blues. Gouldman, newly returned to the UK, joined the band on bass, marking the gigs as the first at which the four future members of 10cc played live on stage. After just four shows, however, the tour was cancelled when John Lodge of the Moody Blues contracted a virus.

Gouldman recalled that the band returned to their homes in Manchester expecting something else to turn up. "But nothing happened," he said. "It was really quite amazing. We'd opened a tour with the Moody Blues ... we were expecting offers of work to arrive, but no one asked us to do anything. The next Hotlegs records flopped and we didn't get a single offer of work. It was extraordinary. We'd had a hit record that had sold two million copies and nobody wanted us."

The group was put with comedian John Paul Joans in order to record a single aimed at the Christmas market, and the result – "The Man From Nazareth" – was a top 30 hit. Another Hotlegs single was released in Britain – "Lady Sadie" (1971, a very naughty lyric with a standard arrangement) – and two others overseas ("Run Baby Run", US and "Desperate Dan", Germany and Spain), but none charted.

In 1976 Stewart, by then achieving success with 10cc, admitted: "'Lady Sadie' had no class and no originality. It was a very mediocre pop song." The album also presented a problem, he said: "That was so different to 'Neanderthal Man' that it was totally alien to what people were expecting from us. It was a good record, a little ahead of its time. It was similar to the things we are doing now. It was very melodic with chord structures that hadn't been used before – and some of the sounds that we used on that album hadn't been heard at the time."

The band returned to the studios to work with other performers. Stewart said: "We sat down one day and said, 'Hotlegs is defunct – let's face it.' And we decided to carry on with our production work."

Godley, in a 1976 interview, described the band as "doomed":

"I'm afraid we blew the whole thing. The first thing we did was take a holiday, and because I'd never been able to afford a good holiday I flew off to Antigua. We'd been working ever since we'd left college and we were knackered, so Lol and I just bought the tickets to Antigua and off we went. We also bought cars as soon as we came back and then went into the studio to make the LP. "We did the whole thing wrong. We should have stayed in England, gone on tour, made promotional appearances, given interviews to the Press and TV and so on, but we just vanished to Antigua. And when we came back Hotlegs had gone cold. The record had now gone out of the charts and no one had ever really discovered who we were. The follow-up single 'Lady Sadie' just bombed out and the album hardly sold at all – though I still say that was a bloody good album. Basically it included the songs and the ideas that we had been hoping to bring into that LP for Giorgio Gomelsky. Most of the tracks were from the Frabjoy period and it's an interesting LP."

After Thinks: School Stinks received worldwide release, it was repackaged (in the UK) by the Philips label in December 1971 as Song, with several tracks replacing originals, including "Neanderthal Man". A compilation album was issued in Britain in 1976 as You Didn't Like It Because You Didn't Think of It putting together previously released material.

The lack of further chart activity saw Hotlegs labelled as a one-hit wonder.

In 1972, American singer Neil Sedaka noticed "Umbopo" and, when he settled in England to record new material, hired Hotlegs (with Gouldman) to be his backing band for his album Solitaire. The success of that album, and its follow-up The Tra-La Days Are Over, led the band to relaunch under the name 10cc.

== Aftermath ==
Thinks: School Stinks was reissued by One Way Records in 1994 on CD. This edition included the line up from the original album release only.

You Didn't Like It Because You Didn't Think of It was reissued by 7T's (a division of Cherry Red) on 22 October 2012. The reissue featured a new cover commissioned for the new release and a booklet with information on the making of the album. The track listing includes all of the original tracks as well as the title track and the US stereo mix for "Neanderthal Man". This was the first CD release for the album which includes all the tracks that Stewart, Godley & Creme recorded as Hotlegs.

== Name ==
According to Eric Stewart, in the 2009 BBC radio documentary The Record Producers, the band's name came about because "there was a lovely girl at the time, a receptionist called Kathy, and she used to wear these hot pants, and we always used to call her 'hot legs', and so we thought we'll call the group Hotlegs".

== Discography ==
=== Albums ===
- Thinks: School Stinks (1971)
- Song (1971)

=== Compilation albums ===
- You Didn't Like It Because You Didn't Think of It (1976)

=== Singles ===
- "Neanderthal Man" / "You Didn't Like it Because You Didn't Think of It" (1970)
- "Umbopo" / "Roll On" (1970, as Doctor Father)
- "Run Baby Run" / "How Many Times" (US, 1971)
- "Desperate Dan" / "Run Baby Run" (Germany and Spain, 1971)
- "Lady Sadie" / "The Loser" (UK, 1971)

== See also ==
- One-hit wonders in the UK
