= The Philosopher Kings =

Canadian band

- Origin: Thornhill, Ontario, Canada
- Genres: R&B; pop; pop rock
- Years active: 1993–1999; 2004–2009; 2016–2019
- Spinoffs: Prozzäk
- Members: Gerald Eaton; James Bryan McCollum; Brian West; Denton Whited; Marc Rogers
- Past members: Craig Hunter; Jason Levine; Jon Levine
- Website: philosopherkings.com

The Philosopher Kings are a Canadian band. The band was most commercially successful in the late 1990s and have been nominated for five Juno Awards, winning one in 1996 for "Best New Group". Most of the band members, current and former, have also had successful careers as songwriters and producers for several artists and performers. Between 1996 and 2016, The Philosopher Kings were among the top 150 best-selling Canadian artists in Canada and among the top 50 best-selling Canadian bands in Canada.

== History ==
The Philosopher Kings formed in 1993. The name of the band is derived from Plato's Republic, in which he outlines the design of an idealistic government, ruled by philosopher-kings. The band released their debut album in Canada in 1994. The album was later released in the United States by Columbia. The group saw minor success in the United States with the single "Charms", which peaked at #36 on the Billboard Mainstream Top 40 chart in 1996.

The band performed across Canada, and won the award for "Best New Group" at the 1996 Juno Awards. In 1997, the band released their second album, Famous, Rich and Beautiful. The album featured several singles which were hits in Canada, including "I Am the Man", "Hurts to Love You", and "Cry". The album was certified Platinum in Canada in 1998 and is the band's best-selling album. The band was nominated for "Best Group" at the 1999 Juno Awards. In 1999, drummer Craig Hunter was replaced by Denton Whited. The band was inactive from 2000 to 2003 as members pursued different projects. In 2004, all of the band members (minus Jason Levine) reunited and the band released the album Castles in 2006, with their lead single, "Castles in the Sand" reaching the top 10 on the Adult Contemporary and Hot Adult Contemporary charts in Canada. After going on hiatus again in the 2010s, the band reunited again in 2016. In 2018, the band released the album Return of the Kings.

== Members ==
=== Current line-up ===
- Gerald Eaton – vocalist
- James Bryan McCollum – guitarist
- Brian West – guitarist
- Denton Whited – drummer
- Marc Rogers – bassist
- Matt Giffin – keyboardist

=== Past members ===
- Craig Hunter – drummer on Philosopher Kings, Famous, Rich and Beautiful
- Jason Levine – bassist on Philosopher Kings, Famous, Rich and Beautiful & One Night Stand
- Jon Levine – keyboardist

== Discography ==
=== Albums ===
Year	Title	Peak chart positions	Certifications
Year	Title	CAN	CAN
1994	The Philosopher Kings	—	Gold
1997	Famous, Rich and Beautiful	62	Platinum
1999	One Night Stand	—	
2006	Castles	19	
2018	Return of the Kings	—	

=== Singles ===
Year	Single	Peak chart positions				Album
Year	Single	CAN	CAN Content (Cancon)	CAN Dance	U.S. Top 40	Album
1994	"Turn My Head Around"	—	6	—	—	The Philosopher Kings
1995	"Charms"	16	—	15	36	The Philosopher Kings
1996	"Lay My Body Down"	—	—	—	—	The Philosopher Kings
1997	"I Am the Man"	7	—	—	—	Famous, Rich and Beautiful
1998	"Hurts to Love You"	8	—	—	—	Famous, Rich and Beautiful
1998	"Cry"	13	—	—	—	Famous, Rich and Beautiful
1998	"You Don't Love Me (Like You Used To Do)"	71	—	—	—	Famous, Rich and Beautiful
1999	"You Stepped on My Life"	30	—	—	—	Famous, Rich and Beautiful
2000	"If I Ever Lose This Heaven"	44	—	—	—	One Night Stand
2005	"Castles in the Sand"	29	—	—	—	Castles
2006	"Give Back the Love"	36	—	—	—	Castles
2006	"Beautiful Creature"	—	—	—	—	Castles
2017	"Still the One"	—	—	—	—	Return of the Kings
"—" denotes releases that did not chart

== Awards ==
- 1996 Juno Award – Best New Group

=== Nominations ===
- 1996 Juno nomination – Best R&B/Soul Recording for Philosopher Kings
- 1998 Juno nomination – Best R&B/Soul Recording for Famous, Rich and Beautiful
- 1999 Juno nominations – Best Pop Album for Famous, Rich and Beautiful; Best Single for Hurts To Love You; Best Group
- 2001 Juno nomination – Best R&B/Soul Recording for If I Ever Lose This Heaven

== Side projects ==
- Prozzäk and Lefthook Entertainment – James Bryan McCollum and Jason Levine
- Jarvis Church – Gerald Eaton
- Track and Field – Gerald Eaton and Brian West
- solo albums – Jon Levine; James Bryan
