= The Philosopher Kings (album) =

Studio album by the Philosopher Kings
- Released: 1994 (Canada)
- Genres: R&B, pop
- Length: 52:45
- Label: Columbia
- Producers: Lenny DeRose, the Philosopher Kings, Mike Roth

The Philosopher Kings chronology
The Philosopher Kings (1994)	Famous, Rich and Beautiful (1997)

Professional ratings
Review scores
Source	Rating
AllMusic	4.5/5 stars

The Philosopher Kings is the debut album by the Canadian band the Philosopher Kings, released in 1994. The first single was "Turn My Head Around".

The album earned the group a Juno Award nomination for Best R&B/Soul Recording of the Year.

== Track listing ==
1. "Turn My Head Around" (3:59)
2. "Lay My Body Down" (4:41)
3. "All Dressed Up for San Francisco" (4:31)
4. "Can't Get My Mind Around You" (4:31)
5. "All to Myself" (4:28)
6. "Leave That Man" (6:30)
7. "Do You Swear" (3:42)
8. "Everyone'll Let You Down" (4:30)
9. "Just Like a Woman" (4:13)
10. "Charms" (4:47)
11. "Fingernails to Claws" (4:49)
12. "No Woman Around" (3:40)
- Track 9 is a Bob Dylan cover.

== Personnel ==
- Gerald Eaton – lead and backup vocals
- James McCollum – guitar, guitar solos, acoustic guitar on "No Woman Around"
- Brian West – guitar, guitar treatments, guitar synth bass on "Everyone'll Let You Down"
- Jon Levine – piano, keyboards, organ, backup vocals, toy bells
- Jason Levine – double and electric bass, backup vocals
- Craig Hunter – drums, percussion, backup vocals

Special guests

- Keita Hopkinson – backup vocals on "Fingernails to Claws"
- Terence Blanchard – trumpet on "Lay My Body Down"
- Bobby Watson – alto saxophone on "Do You Swear"
