= Wedding Bells (Godley & Creme song) =

Single by Godley & Creme

from the album Ismism
- B-side: "Babies"
- Released: 9 November 1981
- Studio: Lymehouse Studio (Leatherhead, Surrey)
- Length: 3:22
- Label: Polydor
- Songwriters: Godley & Creme
- Producers: Godley & Creme

Godley & Creme singles chronology
"Under Your Thumb" (1981)	"Wedding Bells" (1981)	"Snack Attack" (1981)

Music video
- "Wedding Bells" on YouTube

"Wedding Bells" is a song written and recorded by the English duo Godley & Creme, released on 9 November 1981 by Polydor Records as the second single from their fourth studio album, Ismism (1981). The single peaked at No. 7 on the UK singles chart in December 1981.

The single's B-side, "Babies", a synth-pop song, was later included as a bonus track on the double CD compilation Freeze Frame...Plus + Ismism...Plus, released in the UK in 2004, and on a 2006 Japanese reissue of Ismism.

The single's cover was taken by music photographer Peter Ashworth.

== Charts ==
Chart	Position
Australia (Kent Music Report)	44
Belgium (Ultratop 50 Flanders)	23
Ireland (IRMA)	13
Netherlands (Dutch Top 40)	44
UK Singles (OCC)	7
