= Cry (Godley & Creme song) =

1985 single by Godley & Creme

Single by Godley & Creme

from the album The History Mix Volume 1
- B-side: "Love Bombs"
- Released: 11 March 1985
- Genre: New wave
- Length: 6:35 (album version); 3:55 (single edit)
- Label: Polydor
- Songwriters: Godley & Creme
- Producers: Godley & Creme; Trevor Horn

Godley & Creme singles chronology
"Golden Boy (Extended)" (1984)	"Cry" (1985)	"A Little Piece of Heaven" (1988)

Music video
- "Cry" on YouTube

"Cry" is a song by the English pop music duo Godley & Creme, released on 11 March 1985 by Polydor Records. It was included on the duo's sixth studio album The History Mix Volume 1.

The song reached No. 16 on the US Billboard Hot 100 chart, becoming Godley & Creme's lone top-40 hit in the United States apart from their former band, 10cc. It reached No. 19 on the UK singles chart.

The duo directed the song's music video, which features faces blended into each other using dissolving and wiping effects. It was nominated in three categories at the 1986 MTV Video Music Awards: Video of the Year, Viewer's Choice and Best Concept Video.

== Creation and recording ==
After Godley & Creme left their former band 10cc after the group's fourth studio album How Dare You! (1976), they began writing songs for their own albums, but became better known for producing music videos for other bands. Within the music video producing process, they met producer Trevor Horn, ex of the Buggles and now heading his own label ZTT Records.

Godley & Creme asked Horn to produce their album, but had very little material that was recording studio ready. After their first track failed to produce the required effect, Horn asked what else they had. The pair had already written the first verse of "Cry", and much as though the song came from a position – a man in a relationship where his partner lies and cheats on him – unlike 10cc's 1975 song "I'm Not in Love", it did not come from real-life experience. The three hence sat down and started writing down words and phrases which could be associated with the first verse, and then Horn put Godley in the recording booth to record them. Godley later described the song's creation process as "patchwork like", but it worked due to its envisaged simple production.

The basic sound of the track was provided by electronic music specialist J. J. Jeczalik who used the Fairlight CMI, a digital synthesizer, music sampler, and digital audio workstation (DAW). Godley & Creme then created the full backing track, which was mixed and produced by Horn.

== Track listings ==
7-inch – Polydor (UK) 881 786-7

1. "Cry" – 3:55
2. "Love Bombs" – 3:54

12-inch – Polydor (UK) 881 786-1

1. "Cry" (extended version) – 6:30
2. "Love Bombs" – 4:52

12-inch – Polydor (US) 881 786-1

1. "Cry" (extended remix) – 7:25
2. "Cry" (single version) – 3:55
3. "Cry" (extended version) – 6:30

12-inch – Polydor (CA) POLSXC 107

1. "Cry" (remix 12" club version)
2. "Cry" (extended version)
3. "Love Bombs"

CDV – Polydor (UK) 080 010-2

1. "Cry" (extended version) – 6:30
2. "Love Bombs" – 4:53
3. "Under Your Thumb" – 3:45
4. "Power Behind the Throne" – 3:31
5. "Cry" (video) – 3:36

== Chart positions ==
=== Weekly charts ===
Weekly chart performance for "Cry"
Chart (1985–1986)	Peak position
Australia (Kent Music Report)	43
Canadian Singles Chart (RPM)	7
Canadian Adult Contemporary Chart	2
German Media Control Singles Chart	8
Irish Singles Chart	27
New Zealand Singles Chart	16
UK singles chart	19
UK singles chart (Remix)	66
US Billboard Hot 100	16
US Billboard Hot Dance Club Play	22
US Billboard Hot Dance Singles Sales	21
US Billboard Mainstream Rock Tracks	6
US Billboard Adult Contemporary	5

=== Year-end charts ===
Year-end chart performance for "Cry"
Chart (1985)	Rank
Canada Top Singles (RPM)	54

== The Philosopher Kings version ==
"Cry"

Single by the Philosopher Kings

from the album Famous, Rich and Beautiful
- Released: May 1998
- Length: 3:04
- Label: Columbia
- Producer: Joe "The Butcher" Nicolo

The Philosopher Kings singles chronology
"Hurts to Love You" (1998)	"Cry" (1998)	"You Don't Love Me (Like You Used To Do)" (1998)

Music video
- "Cry" on YouTube

Canadian band the Philosopher Kings covered the song for their second studio album, Famous, Rich and Beautiful (1997). It was released in May 1998 as the third single from the album and peaked at No. 10 on Canada's RPM Top Singles chart, ranking in at No. 38 on the magazine's year-end edition.

=== Charts ===
Chart (1998)	Peak position
Canada Top Singles (RPM)	10

== Other versions ==
In 1992, the Australian singer Lisa Edwards covered the song and released it as a single on 13 April 1992. It reached No. 5 on the Australian ARIA Singles Chart, earned a gold record from the Australian Recording Industry Association, and was the country's 41st-best-selling hit of the year.
