= Godley & Creme =

English rock duo

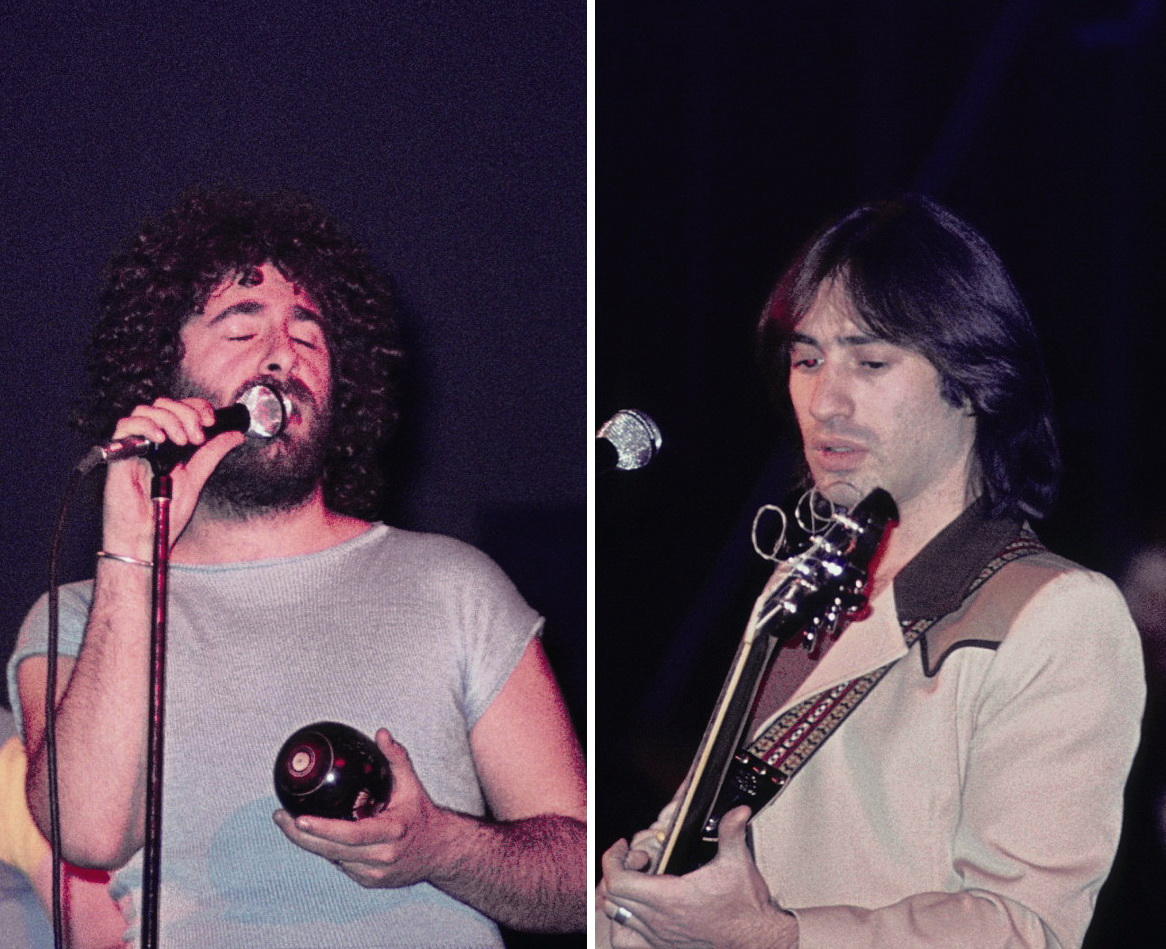
- Kevin Godley (left) and Lol Creme

Background information
- Also known as: Frabjoy & the Runcible Spoon (1969)
- Origin: Manchester, England
- Genres: Art pop; progressive pop; new wave; sophisti-pop
- Years active: 1969; 1977–1988
- Labels: Mercury; Polydor
- Spinoff of: 10cc
- Past members: Kevin Godley; Lol Creme

Godley & Creme were an English pop music duo formally established in Manchester in 1977 by Kevin Godley and Lol Creme. The pair began releasing music as a duo after their departure from the rock band 10cc. In 1979, they directed their first music video for their single "An Englishman in New York". After this, they became involved in the production of videos for artists such as Ultravox, the Police, Yes, Duran Duran, Frankie Goes to Hollywood, Huey Lewis and the News and Wang Chung, as well as directing the groundbreaking video for their 1985 single "Cry". The duo split at the end of the 1980s. Both have since been involved in music videos, TV commercials, and sporadic music projects.

== History ==
=== Early years and 10cc ===
Kevin Godley and Lol Creme met in the late 1950s and for a brief time were in an amateur band together. In the early 1960s they joined white R&B combo The Sabres (The Magic Lanterns) together. Though they played in different bands, with Godley briefly in The Mockingbirds with Graham Gouldman, who would later work with Godley and Creme in 10cc.

After recording a one-off single under the name of 'Yellow Bellow Room Boom' for UK CBS in 1967 ("Seeing Things Green" b/w "Easy Life"), the pair began their professional music career together in 1969, performing pop music in Strawberry Studios at Stockport near Manchester with Eric Stewart and Graham Gouldman. The duo also released a single in 1969, "I'm Beside Myself" b/w "Animal Song", under the name Frabjoy & Runcible Spoon after being signed on to Marmalade Records directly by label head Giorgio Gomelsky. A 7-song LP was slated for a late 1969 release on Marmalade; however, the label collapsed under the weight of its financial situation before the end of the year, and the LP was shelved until its release in the 2022 compilation Frabjous Days: The Secret World of Godley & Creme 1967–1969 on Grapefruit Records.

Joined by Eric Stewart to form Hotlegs they first secured a chart success with the song "Neanderthal Man" which hit #2 in the UK. The band, after serving as the backing band for two successful Neil Sedaka albums, evolved into 10cc in 1972 when Graham Gouldman joined. 10cc went on to record four albums and enjoyed chart success, most notably with their 1975 single "I'm Not in Love", a hit on both sides of the Atlantic.

=== 10cc split and later years ===
After the release of 10cc's fourth LP, How Dare You! (1976), Godley and Creme left the band to perfect a device they dubbed "The Gizmo" (Gizmotron), a module which attached to the bridge of an electric guitar. The Gizmo used small motor-driven rotating wheels which were pressed into contact with the strings, thus creating a continuous, violin-like "bowing" effect on all or any combination of strings, generating infinite sustain in voicings ranging from a single note to a full chord. The device was originally conceived as a cost-saving measure for 10cc. The group already owned and operated their own studio, and all four were talented singers and multi-instrumentalists who could also produce and engineer their own records, so their plan was that by using Gizmo-fitted electric guitars, with additional studio processing and overdubbing, they could create an almost infinite variety of sonic effects and orchestral textures "in-house", saving them the considerable expense of hiring session players to add these textures using traditional instruments.

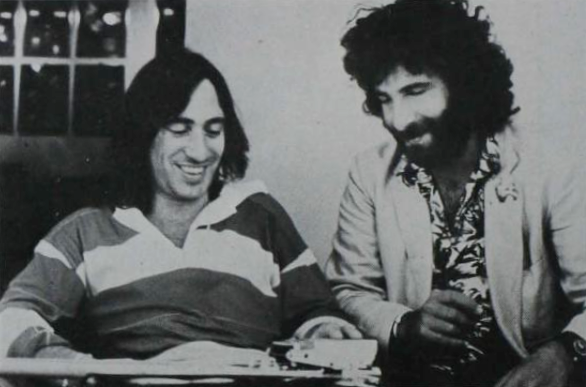
Godley (right) and Creme (left) in 1977

After recording a demonstration single using the Gizmo, their label (Mercury Records) allowed them to continue the project, and over the next year it expanded into a sprawling 3-LP concept album Consequences (1977) with an environmental theme. It contained vocals by Sarah Vaughan and an extended comedy performance by Peter Cook, and was issued in a lavish boxed set package with an accompanying booklet. According to the album's liner notes, the duo's original plan was to hire an all-star cast of comedians (including Peter Ustinov) to perform the album's spoken-word components, but this was soon abandoned, partly due to the cost and logistical difficulty, but also because they quickly realised after meeting Peter Cook that he was able to perform all of the major roles himself. Unfortunately, by the time Consequences was finally released in late 1977, punk was in full swing, and the album was savaged by critics.

In a 1997 interview, Godley expressed regret that he and Creme had left 10cc, saying:

We'd reached a certain crossroads with 10cc and already spent three weeks on the genesis of what turned out to be Consequences ... The stuff that we were coming up with didn't have any home, we couldn't import it into 10cc. And we were kind of constrained by 10cc live ... We felt like creative people who should give ourselves the opportunity to be as creative as possible and leaving seemed to be the right thing to do at that moment. Unfortunately, the band wasn't democratic or smart enough at that time to allow us the freedom to go ahead and do this project and we were placed in the unfortunate position of having to leave to do it. Looking back, it was a very northern work ethic being applied to the group, all for one and one for all. If we'd been a little more free in our thinking with regard to our work practices, the band as a corporate and creative entity could have realised that it could have been useful rather than detrimental for two members to spend some time developing and then bring whatever they'd learned back to the corporate party. Unfortunately, that wasn't to be.

Creme also found the breakup painful, particularly as he and guitarist Eric Stewart are married to a pair of sisters, which made the decision more personal than professional.

The duo gradually regained critical favour with a trio of innovative albums in the late 1970s and early 1980s – L (1978), Freeze Frame (1979) and Ismism (1981, released as Snack Attack in the United States).

Freeze Frame (1979) included several songs that gained airplay on alternative radio in many countries, notably "I Pity Inanimate Objects" and "An Englishman in New York", which was accompanied by an innovative music video. Several notable guest performers contributed to the album: Roxy Music guitarist Phil Manzanera played guitar on and co-produced the album tracks "Random Brainwave" and "Clues", Paul McCartney contributed backing vocals to the song "Get Well Soon" and Roxy Music saxophonist Andy Mackay played saxophone on the single-only track "Wide Boy" and also appeared in the song's innovative promotional video. Alongside the album tracks released as singles, the duo also released two singles (both of which failed to chart) that contained tracks not included on the LP – "Wide Boy" b/w "I Pity Inanimate Objects" (March 1980) and the instrumental single "Submarine" b/w "Marciano" (September 1980).

They made the UK Top Ten with the singles "Under Your Thumb" (a song about the ghost of a suicidal woman who returns to haunt a rail commuter) (No. 3) and "Wedding Bells" (No. 7) in 1981, both from Ismism (1981). The single "Snack Attack" was also a minor hit. Their 1972 pre-10cc single "The Boys in Blue" (written by Godley, Creme, Gouldman and included in the album Strawberry Bubblegum: A Collection of Pre-10CC Strawberry Studio Recordings 1969–1972) was played at most Manchester City football club matches in the 1990s and is still occasionally played there.

In 1983, they released Birds of Prey which took their music in a more electronic direction, using electronic drum machines for the entire album.

Their 1984 single "Golden Boy" was included on 1985's The History Mix Volume 1 album which celebrated 25 years of recording together. The album, co-produced by J. J. Jeczalik of Art of Noise, remixed samples of their previous recordings to a disco beat. This album also contained the single "Cry" which, helped in part by the video, became their biggest US hit, reaching No. 16. The song reached No. 19 in the UK. A video cassette was also released with visual imagery to complement the music.

Godley & Creme released their final album, Goodbye Blue Sky, in 1988. This album abandoned electronic instruments and used harmonicas, organs, and guitars to tell the story of the earth on the brink of nuclear war. The pair ended their working relationship soon after the release of the album. In a 1997 interview, Creme explained:

In '89, certainly in '88, maybe before, Kevin changed, I think his priorities in life changed. He'd had enough, he'd simply had enough of me and the way we worked, the things we did, the priorities we had. And the fact that we were a priority, for example. Our working relationship dominated our lives, you know. It was time for a shift in all that and he was obviously right.

As of 2025, Godley has no contact with Creme, but has revived a songwriting partnership with 10cc bassist Graham Gouldman.

== Video direction career ==
Godley and Creme achieved their greatest success as the innovative directors of more than fifty music videos in the early 1980s. They created memorable videos for Status Quo ("Something 'bout You Baby I Like"), The Police ("Every Breath You Take", "Synchronicity II", "Wrapped Around Your Finger"), Culture Club ("Victims"), Duran Duran ("Girls on Film", "A View to a Kill"), Herbie Hancock ("Rockit"), Go West ("We Close Our Eyes"), Peter Gabriel and Kate Bush ("Don't Give Up"), Frankie Goes to Hollywood ("Two Tribes", "The Power of Love"), Sting ("If You Love Somebody Set Them Free", "Fields of Gold"), Toyah ("Thunder in the Mountains"), Visage ("Fade to Grey"), George Harrison ("When We Was Fab"), Lou Reed ("No Money Down"), Wang Chung ("Everybody Have Fun Tonight"), and Yes ("Leave It"), among many others, up to Godley's video for The Beatles' 1996 single, "Real Love", from the Beatles Anthology.

The pair's innovation extended to their videos for their own songs, notably "Wide Boy" and "Cry". The latter's 1985 video consisted of faces blending into one other using analog cross-fading, anticipating the digital effect of morphing, later used in a similar way in Michael Jackson's 1991 video, "Black or White". This was hailed as "groundbreaking", though it was not without antecedents; a 10-second portion of the promotional video for King Crimson's single "Heartbeat" had used a somewhat similar effect three years earlier.

== Aftermath ==
Creme joined the avant-garde synth-pop group Art of Noise in 1998.

Godley continued to direct music videos. In 2006, he once again teamed up with Gouldman, as they released new music under the name GG/06.

Godley and Creme both participated in 10cc's 1992 "reunion" album, ...Meanwhile, although Godley claims that none of them actually were in the studio with each other.

== Personnel ==
=== Members ===
- Kevin Godley – drums, percussion, keyboards, programming, vocals
- Lol Creme – keyboards, synthesizers, guitars, bass, percussion, vocals

=== Session contributors ===
- Andy Mackay – saxophones (1978)
- Paul Gambaccini – voices (1978)
- Jonathan Handelsman – saxophones (1978)
- Phil Manzanera – guitars (1979)
- Paul McCartney – backing vocals (1979)
- Rico Rodriguez – trumpet and tuba (1979)
- Bimbo Acock – saxophone (1980)
- Guy Barker – trumpet (1982)
- Mark Feltham – harmonica (1988)
- Mitt Gamon – harmonica (1988)
- Jimmy Chambers – backing vocals (1988)
- George Chandler – backing vocals (1988)
- Jimmy Helms – backing vocals (1988)

== Discography ==
Godley & Creme discography
- Studio albums: 7
- Compilation albums: 4
- Singles: 16
- Music videos: 8

The discography of Godley & Creme contains seven studio albums, one of which Consequences (1977), is a triple album and another The History Mix Volume 1 (1985) is a hybrid album that is part studio, remix and compilation album. The duo have released four compilation albums, two of which contained material from their former band 10cc. 16 singles were also released by the partnership, though only five can be deemed commercially successful. Godley and Creme directed a large number of music videos, eight of which were for their group.

=== Studio albums ===
Year	Album	Chart positions					
Year	Album	UK	AUS	CAN	GER	NED	US
1977	Consequences: Release date: 1977; Label: Mercury/Phonogram	52	—	—	—	—	—
1978	L: Release date: 1978; Label: Mercury/Polydor	47	—	—	—	—	—
1979	Freeze Frame: Release date: 1979; Label: Polydor	—	25	—	—	21	—
1981	Ismism: Release date: October 1981; Label: Polydor/Mirage; Notes: Titled Snack Attack in US.	29	77	—	—	28	—
1983	Birds of Prey: Release date: April 1983; Label: Polydor	—	—	—	—	—	—
1985	The History Mix Volume 1: Release date: 1985; Label: Polydor	—	—	50	—	—	37
1988	Goodbye Blue Sky: Release date: 1988; Label: Polydor	—	—	—	44	—	—

=== Compilation albums ===
Year	Album	Chart positions		Certifications (sales thresholds)
Year	Album	UK	NED	Certifications (sales thresholds)
1979	Music from Consequences: Release Date: 1979; Label: Mercury	—	—	
1987	Changing Faces – The Very Best of 10cc and Godley & Creme: Release Date: 1987; Label: Polydor	4	—	BPI: Platinum
1991	The Very Best of 10cc (And Godley & Creme): Release Date: 1991; Label: Mercury/Phonogram	—	10	NVPI: Gold
1993	Images: Release Date: 1993; Label: Spectrum Music	—	—	
2022	Frabjous Days: The Secret World of Godley & Creme 1967–1969: Release Date: 2022; Label: Grapefruit	—	—	

=== Box sets ===
Title	Album details
Body of Work 1978–1988	Released: 8 September 2017; Label: Caroline International
Parts of the Process: The Complete Godley & Creme	Released: 28 February 2025; Label: Edsel

=== Singles ===
Year	Title	Album	Chart positions								Certifications
Year	Title	Album	UK	AUS	AUT	BEL	GER	IRL	NED	US	Certifications
1977	"5 O'Clock in the Morning"	Consequences	—	—	—	—	—	—	—	—	
1978	"Sandwiches of You"	L	—	—	—	—	—	—	—	—	
1979	"An Englishman in New York"	Freeze Frame	—	17	—	4	25	—	7	—	
1980	"Submarine"	—	—	—	—	—	—	—	—	—	
1980	"Wide Boy"	—	—	—	—	—	—	—	—	—	
1981	"Under Your Thumb"	Ismism	3	94	—	32	—	7	13	—	UK: Silver
1981	"Wedding Bells"	Ismism	7	44	—	23	—	13	44	—	UK: Silver
1982	"Snack Attack"	Ismism	—	—	—	—	—	—	—	—	
1982	"Save a Mountain for Me"	Birds of Prey	—	—	—	—	—	—	—	—	
1983	"Samson"	Birds of Prey	—	—	—	—	—	—	—	—	
1984	"Golden Boy"	—	—	—	—	35	—	—	—	—	
1985	"Cry"	The History Mix Volume 1	19	43	12	34	8	27	13	16	
1985	"Golden Boy" (Remix)	The History Mix Volume 1	—	—	—	—	—	—	—	—	
1986	"Cry" (re-issue)	The History Mix Volume 1	66	—	—	—	—	—	—	—	
1987	"Snack Attack (Remix)"	Changing Faces	—	—	—	—	—	—	—	—	
1988	"A Little Piece of Heaven"	Goodbye Blue Sky	—	—	18	12	26	—	17	—	
1988	"10,000 Angels"	Goodbye Blue Sky	—	—	—	—	—	—	—	—	

=== Collaborations ===
Title	Year	Artist	Role
K-Scope	1978	Phil Manzanera	backing vocals and hi-hat on "Hot Spot" (Godley), Gizmo effects, lead & backing vocals (Creme)
Manchester	2001	801	Percussion, Backing Vocals

=== Music videos ===
==== Godley & Creme music videos ====
- "An Englishman in New York" (1979) (with Derek Burbidge)
- "Wide Boy" (1980)
- "Wedding Bells" (1981)
- "Save a Mountain for Me" (1983)
- "Golden Boy" (1984)
- "Cry" / "History Mix 1" (1985)
- "A Little Piece of Heaven" (1987)
- "10,000 Angels" (1988)

==== Partial list of music videos directed by Godley and Creme for other artists ====
1980:

- Visage – "Fade to Grey"

1981:

- Visage – "Mind of a Toy"
- Duran Duran – "Girls on Film"
- Status Quo – "Something 'Bout You Baby I Like"
- Toyah – "I Want to Be Free" / "Thunder in the Mountains"

1982:

- Asia – "Heat of the Moment" / "Only Time Will Tell"
- Graham Parker – "Temporary Beauty"
- Joan Armatrading – "The Weakness in Me" / "When I Get it Right"

1983:

- 10cc – "Feel the Love"
- Any Trouble – "Touch and Go"
- Culture Club – "Victims"
- David Sylvian & Ryuichi Sakamoto – "Forbidden Colours"
- Elton John – "Kiss the Bride"
- Herbie Hancock – "Rockit" / "Autodrive"
- The Police – "Every Breath You Take" / "Wrapped Around Your Finger" / "Synchronicity II"
- Yes – "Leave It"

1984:

- Frankie Goes to Hollywood – "Two Tribes" / "Power of Love"
- Paul Young – "Everything Must Change (US Version)"

1985:

- Artists United Against Apartheid – "Sun City" (with Jonathan Demme and Hart Perry)
- Duran Duran – "A View to a Kill"
- Eric Clapton – "Forever Man"
- Go West – "We Close Our Eyes"
- Graham Parker – "Wake Up Next to You"
- Howard Jones – "Life in One Day"
- INXS – "This Time" (with Peter Sinclair)
- Sting – "If You Love Somebody Set Them Free"
- Thompson Twins – "Don't Mess with Doctor Dream" (with Meiert Avis)

1986:

- Huey Lewis and the News – "Hip to Be Square"
- Jana Pope – "Don't you Hear Me Screaming"
- Lou Reed – "No Money Down"
- Patti LaBelle – "Oh, People"
- Peter Gabriel & Kate Bush – "Don't Give Up"
- Rob Jungklas – "Boystown"
- The Police – "Don't Stand So Close to Me '86"
- Ultravox – "All Fall Down"
- Wang Chung – "Everybody Have Fun Tonight"

1987:

- Go West – "I Want to Hear It from You"
- Peter Gabriel – "Biko"

1988:

- George Harrison – "When We Was Fab"
- And Why Not – "Restless Days"
