= I Love You, Suzanne =

Single by Lou Reed

from the album New Sensations
- B-side: "My Friend George"
- Released: May 1984
- Studio: Skyline (New York City)
- Genre: Pop rock; new wave
- Length: 3:19
- Label: RCA
- Songwriter: Lou Reed
- Producers: John Jansen; Lou Reed

Lou Reed singles chronology
"Martial Law" (1983)	"I Love You, Suzanne" (1984)	"My Red Joystick" (1984)

Music video
- "I Love You, Suzanne” on YouTube

"I Love You, Suzanne" is a song written and recorded by American rock musician Lou Reed, released as both a 7" and 12" single from his thirteenth solo studio album, New Sensations (1984). The lead and only single to chart from the album, it peaked at No. 28 on the Top Tracks chart and No. 78 on the UK singles chart. The music video for "I Love You, Suzanne" received light rotation on MTV.

== Composition ==
Years after the song's release, bassist Fernando Saunders claimed that Robert Quine had composed the guitar riff for "I Love You, Suzanne" in the studio while the band was rehearsing. Upon hearing Quine's riff, Reed had written the lyrics to the song, but he had failed to give Quine a co-writing credit for the song in the album credits, thus cutting Quine out of royalties, which added further strain to their relationship.

Elsewhere, Reed had a different story. "I must have had that riff in my head for six months. It's just a cheap D chord because for what I'm interested in, you don't need a lot of chords. It just came out full-blown, and it was always like that. I sat playing that riff for six months because I'm capable of sitting and playing one riff for hours, and then I said, "Well, it's so simple, why not use it?"

== Track listing ==
US 7" single

1. "I Love You, Suzanne"
2. "My Friend George"

UK 7" single

1. "I Love You, Suzanne"
2. "Vicious"

UK 12" single

1. "I Love You, Suzanne"
2. "Vicious"
3. "Walk on the Wild Side"

== Chart performance ==
Chart (1984)	Peak Position
Australia (Kent Music Report)	71
UK Singles (Official Charts)	78
US Mainstream Rock (Billboard)	16
