= Neanderthal Man (song) =

1970 single by Hotlegs

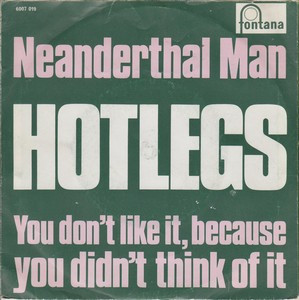

Single by Hotlegs

from the album Thinks: School Stinks
- B-side: "You Didn't Like It Because You Didn't Think of It"
- Released: 19 June 1970
- Recorded: 1970
- Studio: Strawberry Studios (Stockport, Cheshire)
- Genre: Rock; bubblegum
- Length: 4:19
- Label: Fontana (UK); Capitol (US)
- Songwriters: Kevin Godley; Lol Creme; Eric Stewart
- Producer: Hotlegs

Hotlegs singles chronology
"Neanderthal Man" (1970)	"Lady Sadie" (1970)

Alternative cover
- German cover of "Neanderthal Man"

Alternative cover
- Italian cover of "Neanderthal Man"

"Neanderthal Man" is a song by Hotlegs, an English pop band that was later relaunched as 10cc. The song, initially created only as a studio exercise to test drum sounds on new recording equipment, sold over two million copies and reached No. 2 in the UK and No. 22 in the US. It was also a top 5 hit in Germany and Switzerland, and a top 20 hit in Austria, Belgium (Flanders), Canada, France, Ireland, Japan and New Zealand.

== Background and recording ==
The song was the first to be recorded at Strawberry Studios in Stockport, England, on new four-track Ampex equipment purchased by studio owners Eric Stewart, Graham Gouldman and Peter Tattersall. It featured a simple repeated chorus and a heavy drum rhythm that Gouldman's manager, Harvey Lisberg, has claimed became influential in pop music. He said: "I think a lot of people were very influenced by 'Neanderthal Man', which was something new in drum sounds, using four drums on a four-track machine. When Gary Glitter came along with his records, I thought I could hear the same sort of sound deep down in there. I think there were a lot of other people who copied the sound, maybe unintentionally."

Stewart recalled that when the recording equipment had been set up, Kevin Godley set up his drum kit, Lol Creme got out his guitar and Stewart sat down at the control desk. "It was the first time we'd had a real control desk with a four-track machine and we were excited to try it all out," he said. "The whole thing was just an experiment because Kevin wanted to lay all sorts of different drum beats down that he hadn't recorded before, and there was this crazy sort of nursery rhyme that had just got into our heads."

"As we laid down the drum tracks, Lol was singing in the studio with Kevin keeping time – and after we'd laid four drum tracks down Lol's voice came through at a very high level, sounding like something none of us had ever heard before on a record. It really sounded very strange, so we carried on working on the number, adding little bits of piano to it."

By good fortune, Dick Leahy of Philips Records (the record company that had released all the singles by Stewart's former band the Mindbenders on its Fontana label) was in the Manchester area on business and visited the studio. When he asked Stewart what they had been working on, Stewart played the "Neanderthal Man" tape they had just completed. Stewart said Leahy immediately claimed, "It's fabulous! It's a hit record!" and offered a £500 advance. The advance was particularly timely for Stewart, who was considering selling his house and moving to something smaller to provide him with more funding for the studio.

He said the first task was to create a name for the band: "We had no name for the group, of course. But we had a girl at the studio… Kathy Gill, I think her name was, who had very, very nice legs and she used to wear these incredible hot pants. Green, leather hot pants. So we called the group Hotlegs."

Stewart said Philips were not entirely content with the song, however: "The next thing that happened after we'd done the deal was that we got a phone call from them. 'We like the record,' they said, 'but we can't hear the words!' We had about three phone calls about that, and each time I explained that they weren't supposed to hear the words. Eventually they agreed to release it just as we wanted it."

He said there was one further hitch before the song was released: a loud metallic burst towards the end of the song blew a £1200 cutter head as the track was being mastered in the Phonogram cutting suite. He explained: "We had a sound on that track that was something that had never been recorded before. We'd made the sound by taking a large 6 ft by 4 ft sheet of steel into the studio. It was actually a sheet we were going to fireproof one of the doors with – and then at the right moment we had hit it with a hammer. The hammer blow gave it such a shock frequency-wise that the equipment just couldn't take it. At the time this was an embarrassment to all of us, but that faded into insignificance when we found ourselves with such a massive hit on our hands."

== Chart success and later work ==
The song reached No. 2 in the UK on 15 August 1970 and remained there for two weeks, kept off the top spot by Elvis Presley's "The Wonder of You". The song also became a hit across Europe and reached Top 20 in Canada and Top 30 in US and number 24 in Australia.

"Neanderthal Man" was the only hit by Hotlegs. An album, Thinks: School Stinks and a follow-up single, "Lady Sadie", differed markedly from the sound of "Neanderthal Man" and drummer Kevin Godley later admitted the band failed to properly capitalise on their hit with interviews or other promotional work.

== Later releases ==
"Neanderthal Man" was featured in a number of 10cc compilation albums, including 1997 The Very Best of 10cc, 2006 Greatest Hits ... And More, 2017 Before, During, After - The Story of 10cc.

"Neanderthal Man" was sampled in the song "Son of Man" by GG/06, a collaboration between Kevin Godley and Graham Gouldman.

== Charts ==
Chart (1970)	Peak position
Ö3 Austria Top 40	7
Belgium (Ultratop 50 Flanders)	10
Canada (RPM) Top Singles	13
Netherlands (Single Top 100)	23
New Zealand (Listener)	15
South Africa (Springbok)	2
Switzerland (Schweizer Hitparade)	3
UK Singles (Official Charts)	2
US Billboard Hot 100	22
West Germany (GfK)	4

== See also ==
- Neanderthals in popular culture
