= An Englishman in New York (song) =

Single by Godley & Creme

from the album Freeze Frame
- B-side: "Silent Running"
- Released: October 1979
- Genre: Rock
- Length: 5:45
- Label: Polydor
- Songwriters: Godley & Creme
- Producers: Godley & Creme

"An Englishman in New York" is a song by Godley & Creme, from their 1979 album Freeze Frame, featuring acerbic observations of American culture from a British perspective. The shorter single version was promoted by a self-produced music video, which involved Godley singing in front of Creme, as Creme conducted mannequins dressed up as members of a 1930s big band orchestra. This feature is a homage to scenes from the 1971 film The Abominable Dr. Phibes, directed by Robert Fuest.

== Personnel ==
Credits sourced from the original album liner notes.

- Kevin Godley – lead and backing vocals, xylophone, drum machine, handclaps
- Lol Creme – co-lead and backing vocals, electric guitars, piano, bass guitar, handclaps
- Rico Rodriguez – trumpet, tuba

== Charts ==
=== Weekly charts ===
Chart (1980)	Peak position
Australia (Kent Music Report)|	17
Belgium (Ultratop 50 Flanders)	4
Netherlands (Dutch Top 40)	3
Netherlands (Single Top 100)	7
West Germany (GfK)	25

=== Year-end charts ===
Chart (1980)	Position
Belgium (Ultratop Flanders)	41
Netherlands (Dutch Top 40)	26
Netherlands (Single Top 100)	38
