= 10cc discography =

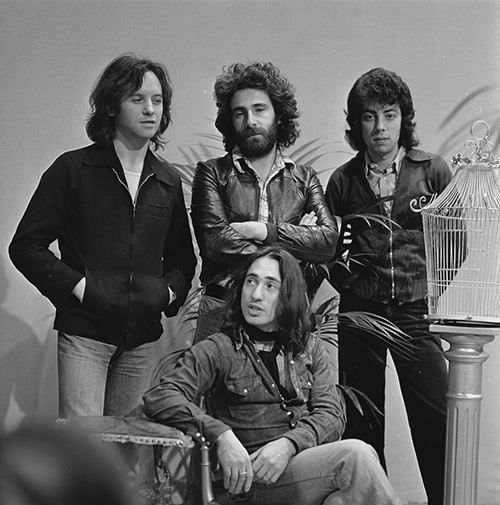
- From left to right: Eric Stewart, Kevin Godley, Lol Creme (seated) and Graham Gouldman.
- Studio albums: 11
- Live albums: 4
- Compilation albums: 17
- Singles: 35
- Video albums: 5
- Music videos: 16
- Box sets: 5

This article presents the complete discography of the British art rock band 10cc.

== Albums ==
=== Studio albums ===
Title	Album details	International chart peaks										Certifications
Title	Album details	UK	AUS	CAN	GER	JPN	NED	NZ	NOR	SWE	US	Certifications
10cc	Released: July 1973; Label: UK Records; Released as Rubber Bullets in Australia.	36	43	—	—	—	—	—	—	—	201	UK: Silver
Sheet Music	Released: May 1974; Label: UK Records	9	87	—	—	—	15	—	—	—	81	UK: Gold
The Original Soundtrack	Released: 7 March 1975; Label: Mercury Records	3	9	5	—	—	—	37	—	—	15	UK: Gold; AUS: Gold
How Dare You!	Released: January 1976; Label: Mercury Records	5	15	5	—	—	7	1	10	5	47	UK: Gold; AUS: Gold
Deceptive Bends	Released: April 1977; Label: Mercury Records	3	8	78	—	—	4	4	4	4	31	UK: Gold; AUS: Gold; CAN: Gold
Bloody Tourists	Released: September 1978; Label: Mercury Records	3	3	74	12	58	2	2	4	3	69	CAN: Platinum; NED: Platinum; NZ: Platinum
Look Hear?	Released: March 1980; Label: Mercury Records	35	38	72	40	—	21	40	3	14	180	
Ten Out of 10	Released: November 1981; Label: Mercury Records	—	70	31	—	—	49	—	17	24	209	
Windows in the Jungle	Released: September 1983; Label: Mercury Records	70	—	97	—	—	7	—	—	—	—	
...Meanwhile	Released: May 1992; Label: Polydor Records	—	—	—	—	84	39	—	—	—	—	
Mirror Mirror	Released: June 1995; Label: Avex UK	—	—	—	—	46	—	—	—	—	—	
"—" denotes items that did not chart or were not released in that territory.

=== Compilation albums ===
Title	Album details	International chart peaks									Certifications
Title	Album details	UK	AUS	CAN	NED	NZ	NOR	SCO	SWE	US	Certifications
100cc: The Greatest Hits of 10cc	Released: June 1975; Label: UK Records	9	—	48	—	—	—	—	—	161	UK: Gold
Greatest Hits 1972–1978	Released: September 1979; Label: Mercury Records	5	15	78	39	13	—	—	42	188	UK: Platinum
Art for Arts Sake	Released: 1982 (Australia only); Label: J&B Records	—	70	—	—	—	—	—	—	—	
The Complete Hit-Album	Released: June 1985 (Netherlands only); Label: Arcade Records	—	—	—	27	—	—	—	—	—	
Changing Faces – The Very Best of 10cc and Godley & Creme	Released: August 1987; Label: Polydor Records	4	—	—	—	—	—	—	—	—	UK: Platinum
The Very Best of 10cc (And Godley & Creme)	Released: May 1991; Label: Mercury Records	—	—	—	10	—	—	—	—	—	NED: Gold
The Very Best of 10cc	Released: March 1997; Label: Mercury Records	37	—	—	—	—	—	58	50	—	UK: Platinum
The Best of 10cc: The Millennium Collection	Released: 2002; Label: Mercury (314 548 237-2)	—	—	—	—	—	—	—	—	—	
Strawberry Bubblegum: A Collection of Pre-10CC Strawberry Studio Recordings 1969–1972	Released: 2003; Label: Castle Music	—	—	—	—	—	—	—	—	—	
The Definitive Collection	Released: March 2003; Label: Universal Music Group	—	—	—	—	—	12	—	—	—	
Greatest Hits ... And More	Released: November 2006; Label: Universal Music Group	42	—	—	—	—	—	43	—	—	
The Wall Street Shuffle	Released: 2007; Label: Weton Exclusive	—	—	—	—	—	—	—	—	—	
Collected	Released: September 2008; Label: Universal Music Group	—	—	—	15	—	—	—	—	—	
I'm Not in Love – The Essential	Released: 2016; Label: Spectrum Music / Universal Music Group	—	—	—	—	—	—	—	—	—	
During After – The Best of 10cc and Beyond	Released: 4 August 2017; Label: Universal Music Group	—	—	—	—	—	—	—	—	—	
Essential 10cc	Released: 5 February 2021; Label: Universal Music, Spectrum Music	53	—	—	—	—	—	8	—	—	
The Things We Do For Love: The Ultimate Hits and Beyond	Released: 20 May 2022; Label: Xploded TV	58	—	—	—	—	—	10	—	—	
"—" denotes items that did not chart or were not released in that territory.

=== Live albums ===
Title	Album details	International chart peaks								Certifications
Title	Album details	UK	AUS	CAN	NED	NZ	NOR	SWE	US	Certifications
Live and Let Live	Released: October 1977; Label: Mercury Records	14	13	76	—	26	8	7	146	UK: Gold
Alive	Released: 25 Jul 1993; Label: Polydor	—	—	—	88	—	—	—	—	
10cc in Concert	Released: 1995 (Show 11 November 1975); Label: King Biscuit Flower Hour Records	—	—	—	—	—	—	—	—	
Clever Clogs	Released: 2008; Label: Proper Records	—	—	—	—	—	—	—	—	
"—" denotes items that did not chart or were not released in that territory.

=== Promotional and limited releases ===
Year	Album	Notes
2007	The Best of 10cc Live	Promotional album released free with The Mail on Sunday newspaper consisting of tracks from the Alive live album

== Box sets ==
Title	Album details
Greatest Songs and More (Great Box)	Released: 1991; Label: Nippon Phonogram
Tenology	Released: 19 November 2012; Label: Mercury Records
Classic Album Selection	Released: 2012; Label: Mercury Records
Before During After - The Story of 10cc	Released: 4 August 2017; Label: Universal Music Group
20 Years: 1972-1992	Released: 26 January 2024; Label: Edsel

== Singles ==
Year	Single	International chart peaks									Certifications	Album (A-side)
Year	Single	UK	AUS	BEL	CAN	GER	IRE	NED	NZ	US	Certifications	Album (A-side)
1972	A: "Donna"; B: "Hot Sun Rock"	2	53	4	—	—	2	2	10	—		10cc
1972	A: "Johnny Don't Do It"; B: "4% of Something"	—	—	—	—	—	—	—	—	—		10cc
1973	A: "Rubber Bullets"; B: "Waterfall"	1	3	17	76	18	1	—	17	73		10cc
1973	A: "The Dean and I"; B: "Bee in My Bonnet"	10	61	—	—	—	1	—	—	—		10cc
1974	A: "The Worst Band in the World"; B: "18 Carat Man of Means"	53 (Note: Chart position is from the official UK "Breakers List".)	—	—	—	—	—	—	—	—		Sheet Music
1974	A: "Headline Hustler"; B: "Speed Kills"	—	—	—	—	—	—	—	—	—		10cc
1974	A: "The Wall Street Shuffle"; B: "Gismo My Way"	10	—	4	87	38	9	2	—	103		Sheet Music
1974	A: "Silly Love"; B: "The Sacro-Iliac"	24	—	20	—	—	—	7	—	—		Sheet Music
1975	A: "Life Is a Minestrone"; B: "Channel Swimmer"	7	48	15	—	—	7	12	—	104*		The Original Soundtrack
1975	A: "I'm Not in Love"; B: "Good News"	1	3	5	1	8	1	5	4	2	UK: Gold; NZ: 2× Platinum	The Original Soundtrack
1975	A: "Art for Art's Sake"; B: "Get It While You Can"	5	61	—	69	—	4	—	6	83		How Dare You!
1976	A: "I'm Mandy Fly Me"; B: "How Dare You"	6	62	—	—	—	3	50	25	60		How Dare You!
1976	A: "The Things We Do for Love"; B: "Hot to Trot"	6	5	24	1	—	2	13	23	5	NZ: Platinum; US: Gold	Deceptive Bends
1977	A: "Good Morning Judge"; B: "Don't Squeeze Me Like Toothpaste"	5	47	20	—	23	—	12	—	69		Deceptive Bends
1977	A: "People in Love"; B: "I'm So Laid Back I'm Laid Out"	51	74	—	90	—	—	—	—	40		Deceptive Bends
1977	A: "The Wall Street Shuffle" (Live); B: "You've Got a Cold" (Live)	—	—	—	—	—	—	—	—	—		Live and Let Live
1978	A: "I'm Mandy Fly Me" (Live); B: "You've Got a Cold" (Live)	—	—	—	—	—	—	—	—	—		Live and Let Live
1978	A: "Dreadlock Holiday"; B: "Nothing Can Move Me"	1	2	1	45	11	2	1	1	44	UK: Gold; NED: Gold; NZ: 3× Platinum	Bloody Tourists
1978	A: "Reds in My Bed"; B: "Take These Chains"	—	—	—	—	—	—	—	—	—		Bloody Tourists
1978	A: "For You and I"; B: "Take These Chains"	—	—	—	82	—	—	—	—	85		Bloody Tourists
1978	A: "From Rochdale to Ocho Rios"; B: "Take These Chains"	—	65	—	—	—	—	—	—	—		Bloody Tourists
1980	A: "One-Two-Five"; B: "Only Child"	—	82	—	—	—	—	29	—	—		Look Hear?
1980	A: "It Doesn't Matter at All"; B: "From Rochdale to Ocho Rios"	—	—	—	—	—	—	—	—	—		Look Hear?
1981	A: "Les Nouveaux Riches"; B: "I Hate to Eat Alone"	—	—	—	—	—	—	—	—	—		Ten Out of 10 (UK Version)
1981	A: "Don't Turn Me Away"; B: "Tomorrow's World Today"	—	94	—	38	—	—	49	—	—		Ten Out of 10 (UK Version)
1982	A: "The Power of Love"; B: "You're Coming Home Again"	—	—	—	—	—	—	—	—	—		Ten Out of 10 (US Version)
1982	A: "Run Away"; B: "Action Man in Motown Suit"	50	—	—	—	—	—	—	—	—		Ten Out of 10 (US Version)
1982	A: "We've Heard It All Before"; B: "Overdraft in Overdrive"	—	—	—	—	—	—	—	—	—		Ten Out of 10 (US Version)
1983	A: "24 Hours"; B: "Dreadlock Holiday" (Live)	70	—	—	—	—	—	—	—	—		Windows in the Jungle
1983	A: "Feel the Love (Oomachasaooma)"; B: "She Gives Me Pain"	87	76	13	—	—	—	7	—	—		Windows in the Jungle
1983	A: "Food for Thought"; B: "The Secret Life of Henry"	—	—	25	—	—	—	18	—	—		Windows in the Jungle
1992	A: "Woman in Love"; B: "Man with a Mission"	—	—	—	—	—	—	55	—	—		...Meanwhile
1992	A: "Welcome to Paradise"; B: "Don't"	—	—	—	—	—	—	—	—	—		...Meanwhile
1995	A: "I'm Not in Love (Acoustic Version)"; B: "Bluebird"	29	—	—	—	—	—	—	—	—		Mirror Mirror
1995	A: "Ready to Go Home"; B: "Age of Consent"	—	—	—	—	—	—	—	—	—		Mirror Mirror
"—" denotes items that did not chart or were not released in that territory. (note * this single was not initially issued in the US; it was issued in 1976 as a double A-side)

== Other tracks ==
=== Collaborations ===
Title	Year	Artist	Role	Comment
"Today" b/w "Warm Me"	1972	Festival	band	single release under alternative band name
Solitaire	1972	Neil Sedaka	backing band	
The Tra-La Days Are Over	1973	Neil Sedaka	backing band, co-producers	
"Da Doo Ron Ron" b/w "Pig Bin an' Gone"	1973	Grumble	band	single release under alternative band name
"A Teenager in Love" b/w "Lark"	1973	Rubber Duckie	band	single release under alternative band name
"Blue Guitar"	1975	Justin Hayward	backing band, co-producers	non-album single, later a bonus track on Blue Jays album
The Eye of Wendor	1978	Mandalaband	vocals from Eric Stewart, Kevin Godley and Lol Creme, vocals and bass from Graham Gouldman	

=== As featured artist ===
Title	Year	Artist	Release
"Independent Women Part 1 (A Capella)" / "Dreadlock Holiday" (Destiny's Child & 10cc)	2002	Various artists	As Heard on Radio Soulwax Pt. 2

== Videos ==
=== Video albums ===
Title	Album details	Peak chart positions
Title	Album details	NED
Live at the International Music Show	Released: 1982; Label: Guild Home Video	—
Changing Faces – The Very Best of 10cc and Godley & Creme	Released: 1988; Label: Polygram	—
Alive - The Classic Hits Tour	Released: 2001; Label: Wienerworld	—
Greatest Hits ... And More	Released: 2006; Label: Universal Music	—
Clever Clogs	Released: 2008; Label: Bright Vision Entertainment	26

==== As featured artist ====
Release	Year	Artist	Contribution
Knebworth Fayre 1976	2010	Various artists	The video includes 10cc performance of "Rubber Bullets" at Knebworth '76

=== Music videos ===
Year	Song	Director(s)	Album
1973	"Donna"		10cc
1975	"I'm Not in Love"	Bruce Gowers	The Original Soundtrack
1975	"Art for Art's Sake"		How Dare You!
1976	"I'm Mandy Fly Me"	Bruce Gowers	How Dare You!
1976	"Don't Hang Up"		How Dare You!
1977	"The Things We Do for Love"		Deceptive Bends
1977	"Good Morning Judge"	Bruce Gowers	Deceptive Bends
1977	"People in Love"		Deceptive Bends
1978	"Dreadlock Holiday"		Bloody Tourists
1978	"Reds in My Bed"		Bloody Tourists
1980	"One-Two-Five"	Russell Mulcahy	Look Hear?
1982	"The Power of Love"	Storm Thorgerson	Ten Out of 10
1982	"Run Away"		Ten Out of 10
1982	"We've Heard It All Before"		Ten Out of 10
1983	"Feel the Love"	Godley & Creme	Windows in the Jungle
1992	"Woman in Love"		...Meanwhile
