= Harvey Lisberg =

English talent manager and impresario

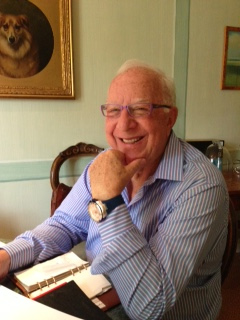
- Lisberg in Manchester, 2014
- Born: Harvey Brian Lisberg; 2 March 1940 (age 86); Manchester, England
- Education: University of Manchester
- Occupations: Talent manager, impresario
- Years active: 1963–present
- Known for: Management of: Herman's Hermits; Graham Gouldman; Lloyd Webber/Rice; Wayne Fontana; Julie Driscoll; Tony Christie; Hotlegs; 10cc Barclay James Harvest; Gordon Giltrap; Sad Café; Wax; Jimmy White
- Spouse: Carole Lisberg (née Gottlieb)
- Children: Philip Lisberg, Paul Lisberg
- Website: HarveyLisberg.com

Harvey Brian Lisberg (born 2 March 1940) is an English talent manager and impresario, best known for discovering Herman's Hermits in 1963. In 1965, he signed songwriter Graham Gouldman, a founder member of 10cc, who Lisberg also managed, along with Godley & Creme, Tony Christie, Barclay James Harvest, Gordon Giltrap, Sad Café, Wax and others.

== Early life ==
Harvey Lisberg was a war baby, born in Manchester, UK, to Violet (née Sternberg) and Judah Lisberg, into a Jewish family. His father joined the British Army at the beginning of World War II, and served in North Africa and Italy until 1945. Mother and son evacuated to Blackpool for the duration of the war, and Lisberg was five years old when he first spoke with his father. Reunited, they returned to Manchester, and young Lisberg was sent to Jewish Day School, before transferring to Carmel College in Oxfordshire, where he was the youngest boarder at school. He ran away three times, once getting as far as London on a penny platform ticket, and struck a deal with headmaster, Kopul Rosen, who let him off as long as he did not run away again. At age eleven, Lisberg attended Salford Grammar School, graduating in July 1962 as a Bachelor of Arts in Commerce from the University of Manchester.

== Sport management ==
Lisberg was always interested in sport, particularly football. In the 1960s, he managed Fred Pickering, when he played for both Everton F.C. and the England national football team.

In the 1970s, he managed England Under-21 player, Gary Owen, negotiating his transfer from Manchester City F.C. to West Bromwich Albion F.C. with Ron Atkinson, for what was then a substantial fee.

Lisberg oversaw the production of several football-related songs, some recorded at Strawberry Studios, and performed and/or written by future members of 10cc, e.g. "Boys in Blue" (1972), "For Ever Everton" (1972), and "Willie Morgan on the Wing" (1974). More recent football songs are "Shearer Shearer" (1996), and "United City Calypso" (2011), featuring Lisberg himself as the artist parodying Lord Kitchener's classic 'City and United 1956 – The Manchester Football Double', to celebrate the next Manchester football double in 2011, when Manchester United F.C. and Manchester City F.C. won the Premier League and the FA Cup respectively.

In 1981, Lisberg ventured into the snooker world; by signing Jimmy White, who he helped mould into the people's champion. Lisberg arranged a complete makeover for White: with a new permed hairstyle, French designer clothes, and a photo session with Patrick Lichfield.

About his move into snooker, Lisberg said "Snooker just had a magic at the time I came into it, around '81. I got more publicity in six weeks representing Jimmy White than in twenty years representing world superstars. Snooker was like the pop music of the 'sixties, and the players were stars in their own right".

Within months, he had added White's good friend and idol, Alex Higgins, to a stable of players that would later include Tony Knowles, John Virgo, David Taylor and Willie Thorne, but by 1985, Lisberg decided to abandon his snooker interests after White defected to another manager in breach of contract.

== Music management ==
The British Invasion of the 1960s (Herman's Hermits and Graham Gouldman)

In 1963, Lisberg was a trainee at accountants Binder Hamlyn (now known as BDO International) when he discovered Herman's Hermits at a church hall in Davyhulme. By early 1964, he was their co-manager, and approached E.M.I.'s Derek Everett, who suggested producer Mickie Most, who in turn agreed to work with the band after seeing them perform in Bolton on a prepaid return air ticket from Lisberg. Soon signed to EMI, their first single was the Gerry Goffin and Carole King composition, I'm into Something Good (with B-side Your Hand in Mine, co-written by Lisberg), which went to Number 1 in the UK charts in September/October 1964.

As George Tremlett put it in his book The 10cc Story:

And so began the career of Herman's Hermits, with Harvey Lisberg as their manager and Mickie Most, their producer. "It was a three-way relationship that lasted nine or ten years", said Harvey. During their years together in the Sixties the group's success was little short of phenomenal, and initially not far behind that of The Beatles. In Britain, Herman's Hermits had fifteen hit singles. In the United States alone, they sold over 40,000,000 records – with one single, "Mrs. Brown, You've Got a Lovely Daughter", staying at number one for [three] weeks and grossing sales of over 3,000,000 copies. Of their six LPs, five were awarded Gold Discs. Herman also appeared in three film musicals.

In autumn 1964, Lisberg enlisted Graham Gouldman, to write songs at his office for a modest weekly retainer. The first endeavour, "For Your Love", was rejected as a Herman's Hermits single by Mickie Most. Lisberg then tried to get the song heard by The Beatles when they were playing the Hammersmith Odeon, and via Ronnie Beck was introduced to the support act's manager, Giorgio Gomelsky who placed it with his band The Yardbirds. Peaking in February 1965 at No. 3 in the UK charts and reaching No. 6 in the US Billboard Hot 100, the song literally broke The Yardbirds, since it also signaled the departure of lead guitarist, Eric Clapton. In 1965, Gouldman penned two more hit songs for The Yardbirds, namely "Heart Full of Soul", whose title was conceived by Lisberg, and "Evil Hearted You". Under Lisberg's wing Gouldman's output proliferated with a string of hit singles for various artistes such as "Look Through Any Window" and "Bus Stop" for The Hollies, "Pamela Pamela" for Wayne Fontana, and before long even Mickie Most capitulated by releasing a total of three Gouldman-written hit singles for Herman's Hermits namely "Listen People", "No Milk Today" and "East West", which was later covered (with new lyrics inserted in the third verse) by Morrissey in 1989.

The stellar successes of Herman's Hermits and Gouldman seduced Lisberg into making music management his full-time job. In the mid-1960s he joined forces with Danny Betesh and took a 50 per cent stake in Kennedy Street Enterprises, who had promoted The Beatles' first tour. Between April and May 1965, a hat-trick of Manchester-based acts, all Kennedy Street artistes, enjoyed an unprecedented consecutive six week spell at No. 1 on the US Hot 100, with Freddie and the Dreamers spending two weeks at the top with "I'm Telling You Now" (10–24 April), Wayne Fontana and the Mindbenders one week with "Game of Love" (24 April-1 May), and then Herman's Hermits a further three weeks with "Mrs. Brown, You've Got a Lovely Daughter" (1–22 May).

Lisberg spent much of his early career globe-trotting with Herman's Hermits, who capitalized on a string of hits in the US and later in the UK, but he also represented acts such as Little Frankie, The Herd, The Measles, Eric Woolfson, The Mockingbirds, John Paul Joans and Julie Driscoll. Always particularly interested in the song, he signed up an array of singer/songwriters such as Harvey Andrews, Peter Cowap, Barry Greenfield, Mark T. Jordan, Ramases and notably Kevin Godley and Lol Creme.

In the mid-1960s, the then unknown songwriters Andrew Lloyd Webber and Tim Rice approached Lisberg in the hope that he would place a new song titled "Any Dream Will Do" with Herman's Hermits. The song was rejected by Mickie Most as a Herman's Hermits single, but Lisberg nevertheless signed the duo to a development deal when he heard their sketches for a musical called Joseph and the Amazing Technicolour Dreamcoat. At the time there were no takers for the sketches, but the show, which morphed into a pop cantata written for schools and then became a concept album before being staged on the West End and later as a Broadway production, has since exceeded all original expectations.

As Sir Tim Rice put it:

Harvey was one of the very first to recognise potential in Andrew Lloyd Webber and myself but he was probably too far ahead of his time in this regard as we were still a year or so away from making our own mark in the music industry. This we did with Joseph and the Amazing Technicolour Dreamcoat which Harvey spotted as a winner way before it became one.

Lisberg managed Wayne Fontana after he left the Mindbenders, allowing guitarist Eric Stewart to step-up to lead vocals on "A Groovy Kind of Love", which reached No. 2 in the UK and US in 1965. Stewart's Mindbenders appeared in To Sir, With Love, starring Sidney Poitier, and released a few singles, two of which were written by Gouldman who later joined the band on bass until it folded in mid-1968, liberating Stewart to focus on developing Strawberry Studios which he co-founded with Peter Tattersall.

Lisberg procured a deal for Gouldman to move to New York and write songs for Super K Productions, the 'bubblegum' hit factory owned by Jerry Kasenetz and Jeffry Katz. This was later reworked allowing Gouldman to return for a few months to record at Strawberry Studios providing both money and kudos for the studio. In 1969, Gouldman acquired a third of the shares in Strawberry and soon Kennedy Street would also become a stakeholder. Even if the Strawberry Bubblegum sessions did not yield much memorable musical output, they did bring Stewart, Gouldman, Godley and Creme together on various polyonymous pre-10cc vinyl incarnations, made in their own studio in provincial Stockport, England, a new destination for international artists from Neil Sedaka to Joy Division.

The 1970s (Strawberry Studios and 10cc)

In 1970, as a sonic experiment to test a 4-track Ampex recording desk, Stewart, Godley and Creme recorded "Neanderthal Man" which was released as a single under the name of Hotlegs. The song became an international smash hit and sold over two million copies worldwide, reaching No. 22 in the US, No. 2 in the UK and topping the chart in Italy. Hotlegs put out an album Thinks: School Stinks (which inspired Alice Cooper's School's Out), and as both Crazy Elephant and Doctor Father, the single "Umbopo".

By this time, Lisberg had already agreed to be Tony Christie's manager after seeing him perform at an awards ceremony in Winter Gardens, Blackpool. Lisberg secured a record deal with MCA Records and introduced Christie to Mitch Murray and Peter Callander, the successful songwriting and production duo. Christie's first two hits were the Murray and Callander compositions "Las Vegas" and "I Did What I Did for Maria", which respectively peaked at numbers 21 and 2 in the UK singles chart, but a follow-up third single was lacking. On a business trip to New York in mid-1971, Lisberg approached Neil Sedaka's publisher Don Kirshner in search of a new gem, and when Sedaka tapped out "(Is This the Way to) Amarillo?" on piano, Lisberg knew he had found Christie's third hit record.

In late 1971, "Amarillo" was a huge European hit and soon became Christie's signature tune, but it rose no higher than number 18 in the UK. It lay dormant for more than three decades until it was lip synced as a video by UK comedian Peter Kay, and some celebrity friends for the 2005 Comic Relief charity drive. The original Tony Christie single was the biggest hit in the UK in 2005 holding on to the No. 1 spot for seven weeks and still remains one of the few singles in the UK to have sold over 1 million records.

In early 1972, after the success of "Amarillo", Lisberg convinced Neil Sedaka to record some new compositions at Strawberry Studios using Eric Stewart to engineer the recordings with Graham Gouldman, Kevin Godley and Lol Creme as session musicians. Sedaka initially agreed to record only three songs but in the event he put down a whole album in just two weeks. The album, Solitaire, marked Sedaka's comeback after a 10-year absence, and the title song was a top five hit for Andy Williams. In 1973, Sedaka revisited the Strawberry team to record his album The Tra-La Days Are Over featuring "Love Will Keep Us Together", whose title is sardonically referenced by antithesis in Joy Division's 1980's Strawberry Studios' recorded classic, "Love Will Tear Us Apart".

After supporting The Moody Blues on tour as Hotlegs, and their acclaimed work as studio band for Ramases, Kasenetz-Katz, Neil Sedaka and others, the four session musicians decided to pool their talents as a unit. In 1972, they signed to Jonathan King's UK Records label, who named the band 10cc releasing two albums, 10cc (1973), and Sheet Music (1974), which featured five UK hit singles, "Donna" – No. 2, "Rubber Bullets" – No. 1, "The Dean and I" – No. 10, "The Wall Street Shuffle" – No. 10 and "Silly Love" – No. 24. The band satirized its small royalty in "4% of Something", and Lisberg tried to leverage the band's success by renegotiating but UK Records was intransigent. In 1975, for a big advance and fair royalty, 10cc left UK Records and moved to Phonogram.

Phonogram released 10cc's third album, The Original Soundtrack (1975), and its hit singles, "Life Is a Minestrone" – No. 7, and "I'm Not in Love", which took the band to another level. In June 1975, the song went to No. 1 in the UK and reached No. 2 on the US charts and was acknowledged as one of the best songs of that year, winning three Ivor Novello Awards for Best Contemporary Song, the Most Performed Work and International Hit of The Year. The song, acclaimed as one of the best love songs ever, is featured in Guardians of the Galaxy, the biggest film of 2014, whose soundtrack Awesome Mix Vol.1 hit No. 1 on the Billboard 200 chart. 10cc's fourth album, How Dare You! (1976), had two UK hit singles, "Art for Art's Sake" – No. 5 & "I'm Mandy Fly Me" – No. 6.

In 1976 Godley & Creme left 10cc, to record a concept album featuring Peter Cook and Sarah Vaughan, to showcase their invention 'the Gizmo'. The triple album boxed-set was called Consequences (1977), which is now a collector's item. Lisberg reflected:

They were great, brilliant, innovative – and what did they do? A triple album that goes on forever.

In 1977, Stewart and Gouldman released 10cc's Deceptive Bends album, with singles "The Things We Do for Love" peaking at No. 2 in the UK and No. 5 in the US followed by "Good Morning Judge" going top 5 in the UK The 1978 Bloody Tourists album featured their best selling and final No. 1 single, "Dreadlock Holiday", later used in the 2010 Mark Zuckerberg biopic The Social Network, but "[t]he 10cc hit machine effectively ground to a halt when Eric Stewart was involved in a car crash in January 1979".

After hearing their demo tape in early 1977 and declaring the group chart certainties, Lisberg decided to manage Sad Café who he placed with RCA Records. The band achieved only moderate commercial success with the first two albums, Fanx Ta Ra (1977) and Misplaced Ideals (1978), but Lisberg persuaded RCA to recruit Eric Stewart as producer for the third album, Facades (an anagram of 'Sad Cafe'), which yielded three top 40 singles with "Every Day Hurts", reaching No. 3 in the UK in September 1979.

Lisberg managed Barclay James Harvest from 1973 to 1977 securing a deal for them on Polydor. Known for their albums and already successful in Europe, he arranged for the band to record their 1975 Time Honoured Ghosts album in San Francisco with legendary producer Elliot Mazer, which failed to break them in America. Under Lisberg's tenure BJH also released Everyone Is Everybody Else (1974), Octoberon (1976), Gone to Earth (1977), and their only UK Top 50 hit single in March 1977.

In 1979, Lisberg approached David Hemmings who was raising funds for a film featuring Joan Collins and starring Farrah Fawcett, and put forward Graham Gouldman to write and record the title song, Sunburn, which became a minor hit single for him in the UK Intrigued by the concept and his similar name, Lisberg approached Steven Lisberger for Gouldman to write and record the soundtrack for his animated film Animalympics, but commercial success was impeded by the US led 1980 Summer Olympics boycott.

The 1980s onwards

Warner Brothers Records negotiated with Lisberg for Graham Gouldman to produce the Ramones album Pleasant Dreams, and oversaw the US release of 10cc's seventh album Look Hear? (1980) and their eighth, Ten Out of 10 (1981), which, at Lenny Waronker's instigation debuted Andrew Gold as co-writer and guest musician on three tracks including their only 1980's UK top 50 hit Run Away. Gold declined Stewart and Gouldman's invitation to join 10cc for their ninth album, Windows in the Jungle (1983).

When 10cc disbanded in 1983, Gouldman and Gold reconnected and formed Wax who signed to RCA for three albums, Magnetic Heaven (1986), American English (1987) and A Hundred Thousand in Fresh Notes (1989). Wax achieved success on both sides of the Atlantic when "Right Between The Eyes" reached No.43 on the US Billboard Hot 100 chart in 1986 and "Bridge to Your Heart" peaked at No.12 in the UK Singles Chart in July 1987. Lisberg placed "Alright Tonight" in Burglar, starring Whoopi Goldberg.

Meanwhile, Godley and Creme became pioneering music video producers, and also released six albums of their own, highlighted by the hit singles "Under Your Thumb" – No. 3, "Wedding Bells" – No. 7 and the iconic "Cry" – their only US top 20 hit. In 1987, Lisberg colluded with Brian Berg of Polydor to reunite the two camps on one compilation which manifested as Changing Faces – The Very Best of 10cc and Godley & Creme, the best-selling 10cc album to date. Godley and Creme themselves split up in 1988.

The success of Changing Faces prompted Polydor to ask for another album featuring all four original band members which was delivered, in a diluted form, with 10cc's tenth album, Meanwhile (1992). A few years later, Avex, the biggest independent record label in Japan, commissioned and released 10cc's final album, Mirror Mirror (1995), with co-writes from Sir Paul McCartney on "Yvonne's The One" (Stewart/McCartney), and Sir Tim Rice on "The Monkey and the Onion" (Rice/Gouldman).

In the mid-1990s Lisberg sold out his 50 per cent stake in Kennedy Street and now splits his time between the US and the UK.

On 30 March 2023, Omnibus Press released his autobiographical memoir I'm into Something Good.

== Bibliography ==
- I'm into Something Good by Harvey Lisberg with Charlie Thomas (2023: Omnibus Press) ISBN 978-1-9131-7288-6
- Starmakers & Svengalis: The History of British Pop Management by Johnny Rogan (1988: Queen Anne Press) ISBN 0-35615-138-7. Chapter 10: Harvey Lisberg (pp 172–181)
- Leave The Capital: A History of Manchester Music in 13 Recordings by Paul Hanley (2017: Route) ISBN 978-1901927-71-9
- The Worst Band in the World: The Definitive Biography of 10cc by Liam Newton (2000: Minerva Press) ISBN 0-75410-311-0
- The 10cc Story by George Tremlett (1976: Futura Publications Ltd) ISBN 0-86007-378-5.
- Behind The White Ball: My Autobiography by Jimmy White;Rosemary Kingsland (1998: Arrow Books) ISBN 0-09927-184-2.
- Rock'n'Roll Survivor: Neil Sedaka. The Inside Story of his Incredible Comeback by Rich Podolsky (2013: Jawbone Press) ISBN 978-1-908279-42-2
- Tony Christie: The Song Interpreter. The Official Autobiography with Chris Berry (2019: Great Northern Books) ISBN 978-1-912101-08-5. Chapter 7: Harvey Lisberg (pp 45–50).
