= The Very Best of 10cc =

Greatest hits album by 10cc
- Released: March 1997
- Recorded: 1970 – 1985
- Genre: Rock
- Length: 1:16:53 (UK); 1:05:57 (US)
- Label: Mercury Records

10cc chronology
Mirror Mirror (1995)	The Very Best of 10cc (1997)	Strawberry Bubblegum (2003)

Professional ratings
Review scores
Source	Rating
AllMusic UK	4.5/5 stars
AllMusic USA	4.5/5 stars
NME	3/10
Sputnikmusic	3.5/5 stars

The Very Best of 10cc is a 1997 compilation album by the band 10cc.

== Overview ==
The album features all of the highest charting material from the band's career and also features several songs by Godley & Creme and "Neanderthal Man" by Hotlegs, acts closely associated with 10cc. The album comes with an exclusive essay written by Chris White especially for release.

The compilation uses Greatest Hits 1972–1978 edits of "Rubber Bullets", "Life Is a Minestrone" and "Art for Art's Sake".

For the US release tracklisting was altered: the songs "Une Nuit A Paris", "Wedding Bells", "Under Your Thumb" and "Neanderthal Man" were omitted, "Dreadlock Holiday" and "People in Love" switched places and "For You and I" was added. Also the longer album versions of "Rubber Bullets", "Life Is a Minestrone" and "Art for Art's Sake" were used as well as the full-length version of "Dreadlock Holiday".

== Reception ==
The album charted at No. 37 on the UK Albums Chart and later received a platinum certification.

Chris Jones from BBC Music wrote that "The impresario (Jonathan King) also gave them their name (look it up on Wikipedia if you need to know why) and between 1972 and 1978 they racked up 12 dazzling top 20 hits; all collected here."

== Track listing ==
No.	Title	Writer(s)	Originally from	Length
1.	"Donna"	Kevin Godley, Lol Creme	10cc (1973)	2:56
2.	"Rubber Bullets"	Godley, Creme, Graham Gouldman	10cc (1973)	4:46
3.	"The Dean and I"	Godley, Creme	10cc (1973)	3:05
4.	"The Wall Street Shuffle"	Eric Stewart, Gouldman	Sheet Music (1974)	3:54
5.	"Silly Love"	Stewart, Creme	Sheet Music (1974)	3:59
6.	"Life Is a Minestrone"	Stewart, Creme	The Original Soundtrack (1975)	4:29
7.	"Une Nuit A Paris"	Godley, Creme	The Original Soundtrack (1975)	8:41
8.	"I'm Not in Love"	Stewart, Gouldman	The Original Soundtrack (1975)	6:06
9.	"Art for Art's Sake"	Stewart, Gouldman	How Dare You! (1976)	4:22
10.	"I'm Mandy Fly Me"	Godley, Stewart, Gouldman	How Dare You! (1976)	5:23
11.	"The Things We Do For Love"	Stewart, Gouldman	Deceptive Bends (1977)	3:33
12.	"Good Morning Judge"	Stewart, Gouldman	Deceptive Bends (1977)	2:56
13.	"Dreadlock Holiday"	Stewart, Gouldman	Bloody Tourists (1978)	4:30
14.	"People in Love"	Stewart, Gouldman	Deceptive Bends (1977)	3:49
15.	"Under Your Thumb"	Godley, Creme	Ismism (1981)	3:43
16.	"Wedding Bells"	Godley, Creme	Ismism (1981)	3:26
17.	"Cry"	Godley, Creme	The History Mix Volume 1 (1985)	3:58
18.	"Neanderthal Man"	Godley, Creme, Stewart	Thinks: School Stinks (1971)	4:13
Total length:				1:16:53

== Charts ==
Chart (1997)	Peak position
Scottish Singles and Albums Charts	58
Sweden Sverigetopplistan	50
UK Albums Chart	37

== Certifications ==
Region	Certification	Certified units/sales
Netherlands (NVPI)	Gold	50,000^{^}
United Kingdom (BPI)	Platinum	300,000^{‡}
^{^} Shipments figures based on certification alone.^{‡} Sales+streaming figures based on certification alone.
