= Greatest Hits... And More =

Greatest Hits ... And More

Greatest hits album by 10cc
- Released: 6 November 2006
- Recorded: 1965–2006
- Genre: Rock
- Label: Universal Music Group

10cc chronology
Strawberry Bubblegum (2003)	Greatest Hits ... And More (2006)	Clever Clogs (2008)

Professional ratings
Review scores
Source	Rating
AllMusic	4.5/5 stars
Classic Rock	7/10 stars

Greatest Hits... And More is a 2006 compilation and video albums of songs by English pop group 10cc as well as pre-10cc and post-10cc work by its founding members, Graham Gouldman, Eric Stewart and Kevin Godley and Lol Creme, performing as Godley & Creme.

== Content ==
The band's first six albums, from 10cc (1973) through to Deceptive Bends (1977) are very well represented with four tracks each except for How Dare You! which has only three tracks featured. Only one song from Bloody Tourists (1978) features, however, and no material from any of the band's further five albums is featured, except for Mirror Mirror (1995), which is represented with "Ready to Go Home".

Three Godley & Creme songs are featured, two of these from Ismism (1981) and another from The History Mix Volume 1 (1985). The only album from an early incarnation of 10cc, Hotlegs' album Thinks: School Stinks (1971), is represented with the hit "Neanderthal Man". The biggest hit by Wax (Graham Gouldman and Andrew Gold) is also featured.

Finally, Graham Gouldman recordings of songs he had written for popular 1960s bands are featured on disc two, amongst them are songs he had written for The Hollies and The Yardbirds. "A Groovy Kind of Love" by The Mindbenders, a mid-1960s band featuring Eric Stewart, is also featured as the song was a hit in both the UK and the US. Two songs from GG/06 (Godley and Gouldman) also featured, these songs never having a release before.

The track "Feel the Benefit" included on the second CD was disrupted, running at a slow speed and making it a minute longer than the original.

== Release ==
The album was released as a double CD. The accompanying simultaneous video album is a re-release of the 1988 video Changing Faces – The Very Best of 10cc and Godley & Creme.

== Reception ==
The album attracted criticism both from fans regarding the disruption of "Feel the Benefit" and from Eric Stewart, who noted his post-10cc work had been overlooked, while a disproportionate number of tracks representing Gouldman's career before and after 10cc had been included and indicated that Harvey Lisberg, the former 10cc manager and long-time Gouldman manager, had had a significant role in the album's track selection.

Some fans seem to think that I may have vetoed the use of my own songs on the album, especially as Kevin and Graham have two new songs on there, but this definitely isn't the case. Lol and I were simply not consulted by Universal about the content of the release and didn't know anything until the advertising appeared. It does appear that the compilation has been hijacked, the number of Gouldman songs being completely disproportionate. Why no Frabjoy and the Runcible Spoon etc etc? Anyone initially reading the track list could be forgiven for thinking that it should really have been called "A History of Graham Gouldman's Musical Associations"!
I am very shocked and sad that this has happened, but again, like the recent tours, you will have to make up your own minds whether this album represents a real 10cc compilation or not.

— Eric Stewart

== Track listing ==
Disc One:

1. "Donna" (from 10cc, 1973)
2. "Rubber Bullets" (from 10cc, 1973)
3. "The Dean and I" (from 10cc, 1973)
4. "The Wall Street Shuffle" (from Sheet Music, 1974)
5. "Silly Love" (from Sheet Music, 1974)
6. "Life Is a Minestrone" (from The Original Soundtrack, 1975)
7. "I'm Not in Love" (from The Original Soundtrack, 1975)
8. "Art for Art's Sake" (from How Dare You!, 1976)
9. "I'm Mandy Fly Me" (from How Dare You!, 1976)
10. "The Things We Do for Love" (from Deceptive Bends, 1977)
11. "Good Morning Judge" (from Deceptive Bends, 1977)
12. "Dreadlock Holiday" (from Bloody Tourists, 1978)
13. "Ready to Go Home" (from Mirror Mirror, 1995)
14. "Cry" – Godley & Creme (from The History Mix Volume 1, 1985)
15. "Neanderthal Man" – Hotlegs (from Thinks: School Stinks, 1971)
16. "Bridge to Your Heart" – Wax (from American English, 1987)

Disc Two:

1. "Johnny Don't Do It" (from 10cc, 1973)
2. "Old Wild Men" (from Sheet Music, 1974)
3. "Worst Band in the World" (from Sheet Music, 1974)
4. "People in Love" (from Deceptive Bends, 1977)
5. "Feel the Benefit" (from Deceptive Bends, 1977)
6. "Don't Hang Up" (from How Dare You!, 1976)
7. "Second Sitting for the Last Supper" (from The Original Soundtrack, 1975)
8. "Une Nuit A Paris" (from The Original Soundtrack, 1975)
9. "Under Your Thumb" – Godley & Creme (from Ismism, 1981)
10. "Wedding Bells" – Godley & Creme (from Ismism, 1981)
11. "A Groovy Kind of Love" – The Mindbenders (from A Groovy Kind of Love, 1966)
12. "No Milk Today" – Graham Gouldman (from The Graham Gouldman Thing, 1968)
13. "Bus Stop" – Graham Gouldman (from The Graham Gouldman Thing, 1968)
14. "For Your Love" – Graham Gouldman (from The Graham Gouldman Thing, 1968)
15. "Heart Full of Soul" – Graham Gouldman (from And Another Thing..., 2000)
16. "Beautifulloser.com" – GG/06 (previously unreleased, 2006)
17. "Son of Man" – GG/06 (previously unreleased, 2006)
