= Greatest Hits 1972–1978 =

Greatest hits album by 10cc
- Released: 21 September 1979
- Recorded: 1972–1978
- Genre: Rock
- Label: Mercury
- Producer: 10cc

10cc chronology
Bloody Tourists (1978)	Greatest Hits 1972–1978 (1979)	Look Hear? (1980)

Singles from Greatest Hits 1972-1978
- 1. "I'm Not in Love" Released: 21 September 1979

Professional ratings
Review scores
Source	Rating
Allmusic	4/5 stars
Christgau's Record Guide	B+

Greatest Hits 1972–1978 is a compilation album by the English rock band 10cc, released on 21 September 1979.

== Content ==
The compilation brings together all the band's charting UK singles between 1972 and 1978 and is the first to include the band's recordings both with UK Records and Mercury. "Rubber Bullets" and "Life Is a Minestrone" are presented in new edits, while "The Dean and I" and "Art for Art's Sake" are presented in single edited forms.

The cover art for the album was designed by Storm Thorgerson.

== Release and reception ==
The album was released in 1979 and was intended as a stop-gap between albums, whilst Eric Stewart recovered from his car accident that temporary halted the band's activity. The album was a big success, reaching No. 5 in the UK charts. A single was released alongside, coupling 10cc biggest hit "I'm Not in Love" with "For You and I" from the Bloody Tourists album. The single failed to chart.

All the tracks from the compilation were later included on the 1997 compilation The Very Best of 10cc.

The album was reissued as part of the 2017 During After – The Best of 10cc and Beyond compilation album and Before During After – The Story of 10cc box set.

== Critical reception ==
Reviewing in Christgau's Record Guide: Rock Albums of the Seventies (1981), Robert Christgau wrote: "Separating the jokes from the japes, eschewing atmospheric preciosity, and climaxing with two great pieces of lovesong schmaltz that define the group's seriousness, this is as consistent a 10cc LP as you can buy. But I miss oldies like 'Johnny, Don't Do It,' 'The Worst Band in the World,' 'Oh Effendi.' And I still don't believe 'Dreadlock Holiday' is 'Safe European Home' in corporate-rock drag."

== Track listing ==
1. "Rubber Bullets" (Godley, Creme, Gouldman) - 4:43
2. "Donna" (Godley, Creme) - 2:56
3. "Silly Love" (Stewart, Creme) - 3:15
4. "The Dean and I" (Godley, Creme) - 2:52
5. "Life Is a Minestrone" (Creme, Stewart) - 4:27
6. "The Wall Street Shuffle" (Stewart, Gouldman) - 3:52
7. "Art for Art's Sake" (Stewart, Gouldman) - 4:21
8. "I'm Mandy Fly Me" (Stewart, Gouldman, Godley) - 5:21
9. "Good Morning Judge" (Stewart, Gouldman) - 2:54
10. "The Things We Do for Love" (Stewart, Gouldman) - 3:22
11. "Dreadlock Holiday" (Stewart, Gouldman) - 5:01
12. "I'm Not in Love" (Stewart, Gouldman) - 6:06

== Charts ==
Chart (1979/80)	Peak position
Australia (Kent Music Report)	15
UK Albums (OCC)	5
US Billboard 200	188
