= List of 10cc band members =

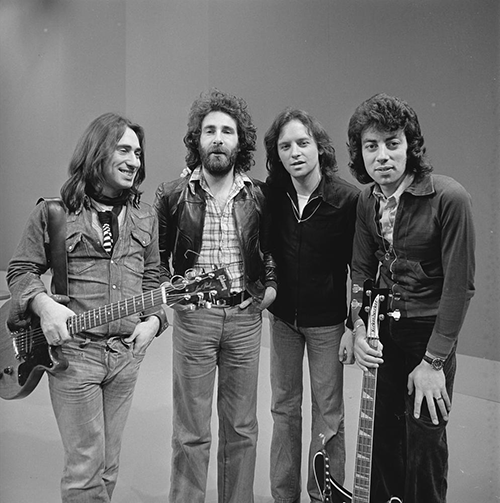
(left to right) Lol Creme, Kevin Godley, Eric Stewart and Graham Gouldman

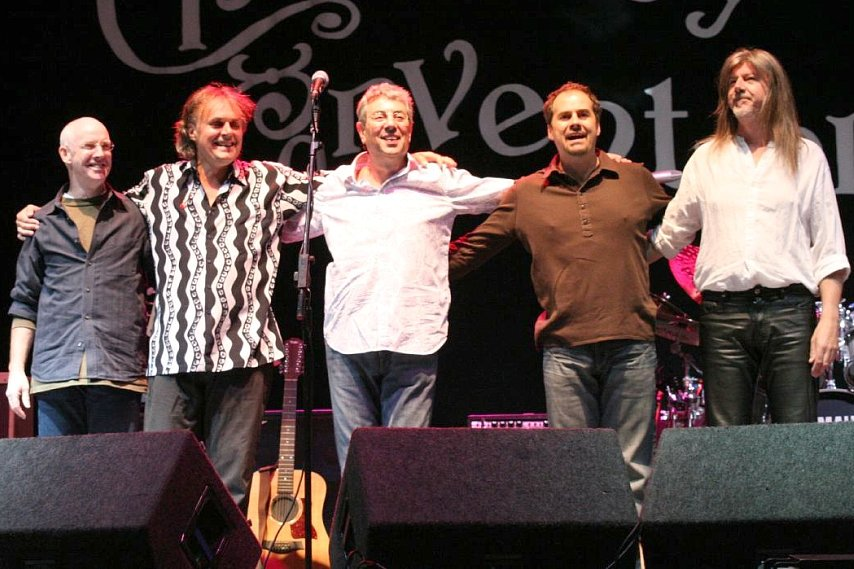
(left to right) Keith Hayman, Rick Fenn, Graham Gouldman, Mick Wilson and Paul Burgess

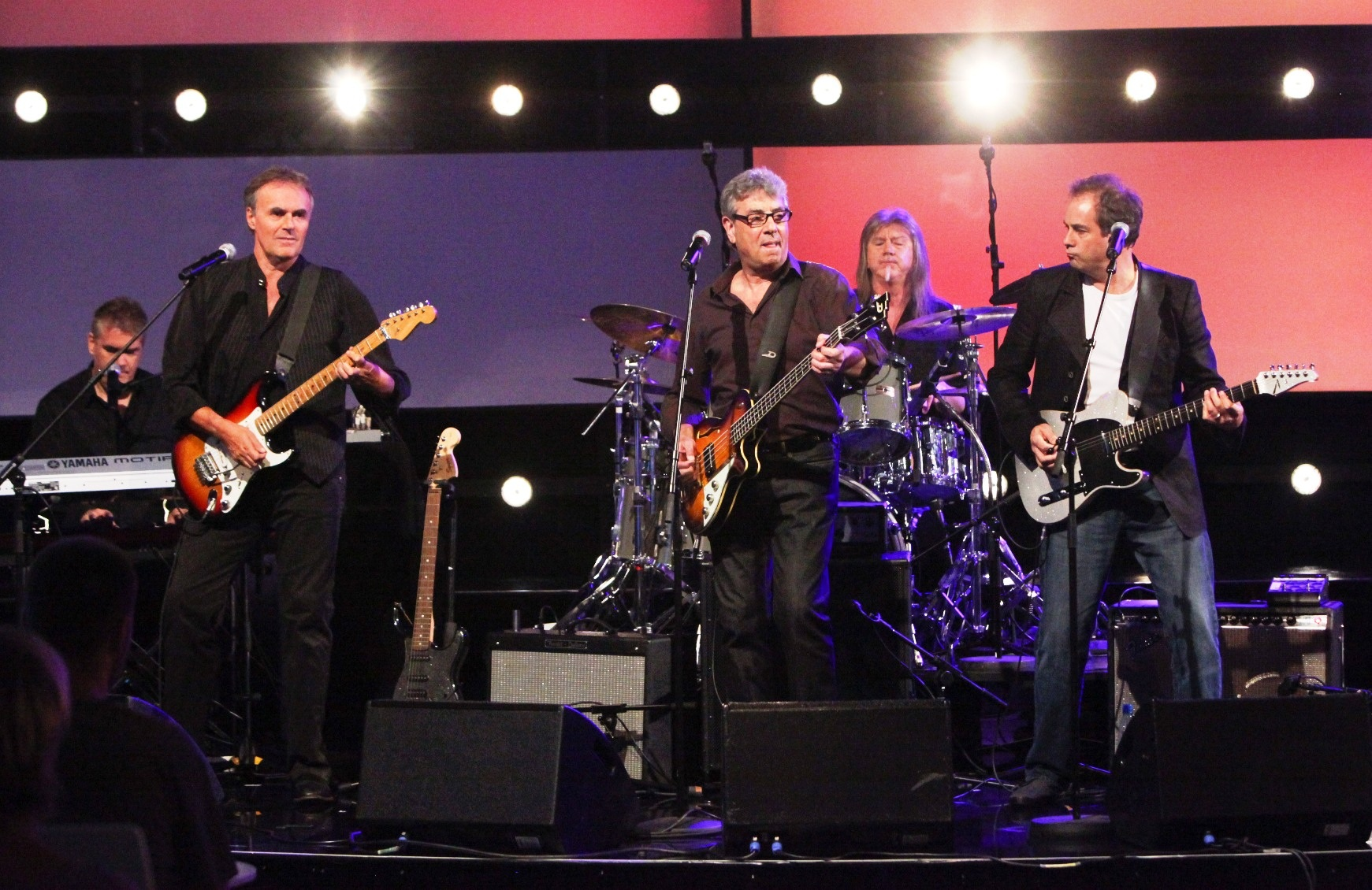
(left to right) Mike Stevens, Rick Fenn, Graham Gouldman, Paul Burgess and Mike Wilson

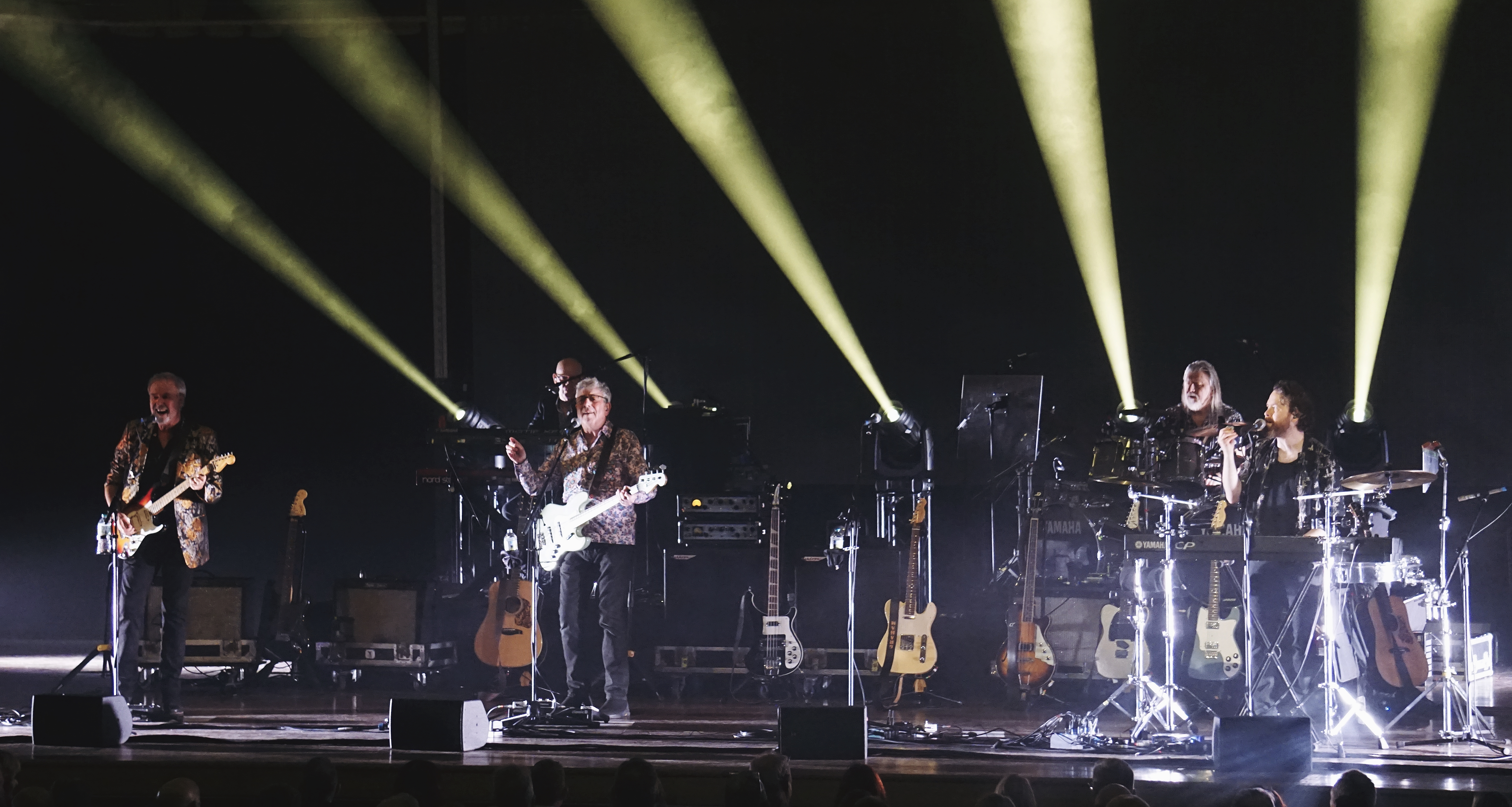
(left to right) Keith Hayman, Nick Kendall, Graham Gouldman, Iain Hornal and Paul Burgess

Four line-ups of 10cc in 1974, 2006, 2010 and 2022

10cc are an English art rock band from Manchester. Formed in July 1972, the group originally featured keyboardist/guitarist Eric Stewart, bassist/guitarist Graham Gouldman, keyboardist/guitarist Lol Creme and drummer Kevin Godley, all of whom shared vocal duties. Gouldman is the only remaining original member in the band's current lineup, which also includes guitarist Rick Fenn (who first joined in 1976), keyboardist and guitarist Keith Hayman (from 2007 to 2011, and since 2016), lead vocalist, guitarist and percussionist Iain Hornal (a substitute member since 2013, official since 2017) and drummer Ben Stone (since 2025).

== History ==
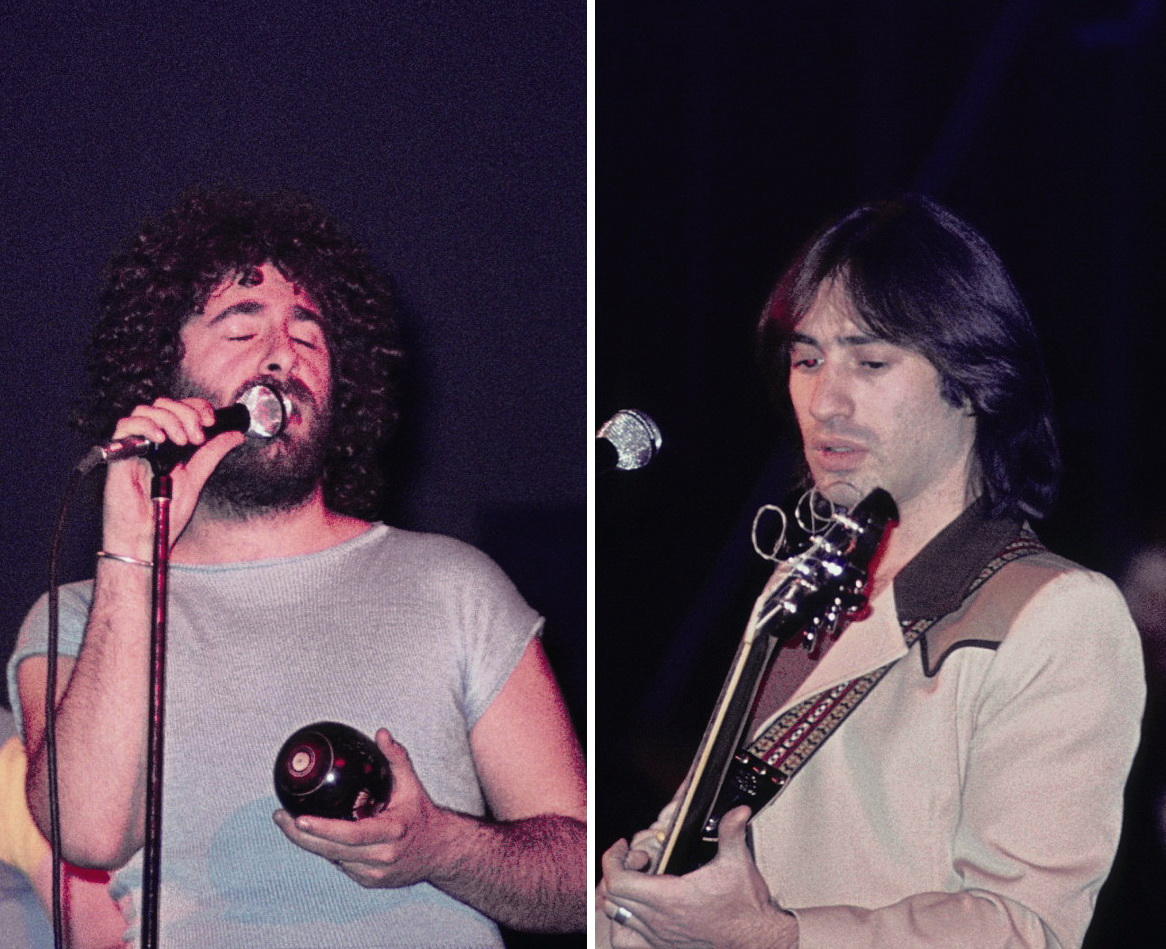
Kevin Godley (left) and Lol Creme (right) both left 10cc in 1976.

=== 1972–1983 ===
10cc were formed in July 1972 by Eric Stewart, Graham Gouldman, Lol Creme and Kevin Godley. The band released their self-titled debut album in 1973 and toured with second drummer Paul Burgess, leaving Godley free to share live vocal duties. After three more albums – Sheet Music, The Original Soundtrack and How Dare You! – both Godley and Creme left in November 1976, at which point Burgess became an official member. The remaining trio recorded Deceptive Bends, after which guitarist Rick Fenn, keyboardist Tony O'Malley and drummer Stuart Tosh were added in May 1977. By May the next year, O'Malley had been replaced by Duncan Mackay.

By the summer of 1981, following the release of Bloody Tourists and Look Hear?, Mackay had left 10cc. He was replaced for the recording of Ten Out of 10 by Vic Emerson. Tosh left around the same time. In summer 1982, Burgess left 10cc when he temporarily toured with Jethro Tull, following the departure of Gerry Conway. His absence meant he was not present for the recording of Windows in the Jungle, for which Tosh returned to the group. For the tour in promotion of the album, Tosh was joined by Jamie Lane. By the end of the year, the group had disbanded. Both Stewart and Gouldman subsequently worked in record production.

=== Since 1991 ===
In 1991, Stewart and Gouldman reunited with Lol Creme and Kevin Godley to record ...Meanwhile. The pair returned to touring in 1993, with Rick Fenn and Stuart Tosh back in the lineup, alongside new keyboardist Stephen Pigott and drummer Gary Wallis. During the early months of 1995, the band toured with Alan Park and Geoff Dunn in place of Pigott and Wallis, respectively. Shortly after the release of Mirror Mirror in the summer, the group disbanded. According to Stewart, he and Gouldman had already parted ways by the time the album came out.

Gouldman reformed 10cc as a touring-only band in 1999, with Fenn and former drummer Paul Burgess returning, alongside new members Mick Wilson on vocals, percussion and guitar, and Mike Stevens on keyboards, saxophone, bass and guitar. Shortly after the tour which spawned live album Clever Clogs, Stevens left to become Take That's musical director, at which point Keith Hayman took over on keyboards. Stevens returned in 2011, before Hayman returned again in 2016. In December 2017, Wilson was replaced by Iain Hornal, who had previously toured with the band and with Stevens in Jeff Lynne's ELO. Though dates in 2018 featured singer Paul Canning.

When Jeff Lynne's ELO started touring again in 2023, Hormal was replaced by Andy Park. In October 2025, Paul Burgess departed the band, his replacement was Ben Stone.

== Members ==
=== Current ===
Image	Name	Years active	Instruments	Release contributions
	Graham Gouldman	1972–1983; 1991–1995; 1999–present	bass; rhythm and lead guitar; percussion; lead and backing vocals; occasional keyboards	all 10cc releases
	Rick Fenn	1976–1983; 1993–1995; 1999–present	lead guitar; bass; keyboards; backing and lead vocals; occasional saxophone	all 10cc releases from Live and Let Live (1977) to Windows in the Jungle (1983), and from Alive (1993) onwards
	Keith Hayman	2007–2011; 2016–present	keyboards; bass; rhythm guitar; backing vocals	The Things We Do For Love (Live) (2022)
	Iain Hornal	2017–present (touring 2013–17; hiatus 2018 & late 2024)	lead and backing vocals; rhythm guitar; bass guitar; percussion; keyboards; mandolin	The Things We Do For Love (Live) (2022)
	Ben Stone	2025–present	drums; percussion	none

=== Former ===
Image	Name	Years active	Instruments	Release contributions
	Eric Stewart	1972–1983; 1991–1995	lead and rhythm guitars; bass; keyboards; percussion; lead and backing vocals	all 10cc releases from 10cc (1973) to Mirror Mirror (1995)
	Laurence "Lol" Creme	1972–1976; 1991–1992	keyboards; rhythm and lead guitars; percussion; lead and backing vocals	all 10cc releases from 10cc (1973) to How Dare You! (1976); ...Meanwhile (1992)
	Kevin Godley	1972–1976; 1991–1992; Occasional live guest	drums; percussion; lead and backing vocals	all 10cc releases from 10cc (1973) to How Dare You! (1976); ...Meanwhile (1992); Clever Clogs: Live in Concert (2008)
	Paul Burgess	1973–1982 (touring 1973–76); 1999–2025	drums; percussion; vibraphone; keyboards; backing vocals	all 10cc releases from Deceptive Bends (1977) to Ten Out of 10 (1981); Clever Clogs: Live in Concert (2008)
	Stuart Tosh	1977–1981; 1982–1983; 1993–1995	drums; percussion; trombone; backing and lead vocals	Live and Let Live (1977); Bloody Tourists (1978); Look Hear? (1980); Windows in the Jungle (1983); Alive (1993)
	Tony O'Malley	1977–1978	keyboards; backing and lead vocals; percussion	Live and Let Live (1977)
	Duncan Mackay	1978–1981	keyboards; harpsichord; percussion; backing vocals; violin	Bloody Tourists (1978); Look Hear? (1980)
	Vic Emerson	1981–1983 (died 2018)	keyboards	Ten Out of 10 (1981); Windows in the Jungle (1983)
	Jamie Lane	1983	drums; percussion	none
	Stephen Pigott	1993–1995	keyboards; programming	Alive (1993); Mirror Mirror (1995)
	Gary Wallis	1993–1995	drums; percussion	Alive (1993); Mirror Mirror (1995)
	Geoff Dunn	1995	drums; percussion	none
	Alan Park	1995	keyboards	none
	Mick Wilson	1999–2017	lead and backing vocals; rhythm guitar; percussion	Clever Clogs: Live in Concert (2008)
	Mike Stevens	1999–2007; 2011–2016	keyboards; saxophone; bass; rhythm guitar; backing vocals	Clever Clogs: Live in Concert (2008)
	Paul Canning	2018	lead and backing vocals; percussion; rhythm guitar; keyboards	none
	Nick Kendall	2020–2021 (substitute)	lead guitar; bass; vocals	none
	Andy Park	2024 (substitute for Hornal)	lead and backing vocals; rhythm guitar; bass guitar; percussion; keyboards; mandolin	none

=== Session musicians ===
Image	Name	Years active	Instruments	Release contributions
	Mair Jones	1975	harp	How Dare You! (1976)
	Del Newman	1976–1977 (died 2020)	string arrangements	Deceptive Bends (1977)
	Jean Alain Roussel	1976–1977	electric piano; organ	Deceptive Bends (1977)
	Tony Spath	1976–1977; 1978	piano; oboe; backing vocals	Deceptive Bends (1977); Bloody Tourists (1978)
	Kate Spath	1978	cello	Bloody Tourists (1978)
	Marc Jordan	1980–1981	organ; piano; backing vocals; electric piano	Ten Out of 10 (1981)
	Lenni Crookes	1980–1981	saxophone	Ten Out of 10 (1981)
	Keith Bessey	1980–1981	maracas	Ten Out of 10 (1981)
	Andrew Gold	1980–1981; 1990–1991 (died 2011)	lead and backing vocals; bass; guitar; 12 string guitar; piano; electric piano; synthesiser; vocoder; percussion	Ten Out of 10 (1981); ...Meanwhile (1992); Mirror Mirror (1995)
	Simon Phillips	1980–1981; 1982–1983	drums	Ten Out of 10 (1981); Windows in the Jungle (1983)
	Mike Timony	1982–1983	keyboards	Windows in the Jungle (1983)
	Mel Collins	1982–1983	saxophones	Windows in the Jungle (1983)
	Steve Gadd	1982–1983	drums; percussion	Windows in the Jungle (1983)
	Jeff Porcaro	1990–1991 (died 1992)	drums; percussion	...Meanwhile (1992)
	Dr. John	1990–1991 (died 2019)	grand piano	...Meanwhile (1992)
	Freddie Washington	1990–1991	5-string bass guitar	...Meanwhile (1992)
	Michael Landau	1990–1991	lead and rhythm guitar	...Meanwhile (1992)
	Gordon Gaines	1990–1991	lead guitar	...Meanwhile (1992)
	David Paich	1990–1991	Hammond B3 organ; melody synth; string synth	...Meanwhile (1992)
	Bashiri Johnson	1990–1991	percussion; tambourine	...Meanwhile (1992)
	Paul Griffin	1990–1991	synthesizers	...Meanwhile (1992)
	Jerry Hey	1990–1991	horn arrangement; trumpet	...Meanwhile (1992)
	Gary Grant	1990–1991	trumpet	...Meanwhile (1992)
	Dan Higgins	1990–1991	saxophone	...Meanwhile (1992)
	Kim Hutchcroften	1990–1991	saxophone	...Meanwhile (1992)
	Bill Reichenbach Jr.	1990–1991	trombone	...Meanwhile (1992)
	Frank Floyd	1990–1991	backing vocals	...Meanwhile (1992)
	Fonzi Thornton	1990–1991	backing vocals	...Meanwhile (1992)
	Curtis King	1990–1991	backing vocals	...Meanwhile (1992)
	Tawatha Agee	1990–1991	backing vocals	...Meanwhile (1992)
	Vaneese Thomas	1990–1991	backing vocals	...Meanwhile (1992)
	Adrian Lee	1991	bass; programming; arrangements; keyboard; backing vocals; brass section; percussion; accordion; vibes; acoustic guitar	Mirror Mirror (1995)
	Paul McCartney	1991	rhythm guitar; strings; electric piano; frogs; crickets; percussion	Mirror Mirror (1995)
	Ian Thomas	1991	drums	Mirror Mirror (1995)
	Gary Barnacle	1991	saxophone	Mirror Mirror (1995)
	Peter Thoms	1991	trombone	Mirror Mirror (1995)
	Lise Aferiat	1991	violin	Mirror Mirror (1995)
	Nicola Burton	1991	violin	Mirror Mirror (1995)
	Chris Goldscheider	1991	viola	Mirror Mirror (1995)
	Patrick Jones	1991	cello	Mirror Mirror (1995)
	Andrew Hines	1991	cello	Mirror Mirror (1995)

== Line-ups ==
Period	Members	Releases
July 1972 – November 1976	Eric Stewart – guitar, keyboards, percussion, vocals; Graham Gouldman – bass, guitar, percussion, vocals; Lol Creme – keyboards, guitar, percussion, vocals; Kevin Godley – drums, percussion, vocals	10cc (1973); Sheet Music (1974); The Original Soundtrack (1975); How Dare You! (1976)
November 1976 – May 1977	Eric Stewart – guitar, keyboards, percussion, vocals; Graham Gouldman – bass, guitar, percussion, vocals; Paul Burgess – drums, percussion, keyboards, vocals	Deceptive Bends (1977)
May 1977 – May 1978	Eric Stewart – guitar, keyboards, percussion, vocals; Rick Fenn – guitar, bass, keyboards, vocals; Graham Gouldman – bass, guitar, percussion, vocals; Tony O'Malley – keyboards, percussion, vocals; Paul Burgess – drums, percussion, keyboards, vocals; Stuart Tosh – percussion, drums, vocals	Live and Let Live (1977)
May 1978 – summer 1981	Eric Stewart – guitar, keyboards, percussion, vocals; Rick Fenn – guitar, bass, keyboards, vocals; Graham Gouldman – bass, guitar, percussion, vocals; Duncan Mackay – keyboards, percussion, vocals; Paul Burgess – drums, percussion, keyboards, vocals; Stuart Tosh – percussion, drums, vocals	Bloody Tourists (1978); Look Hear? (1980)
Summer 1981 – summer 1982	Eric Stewart – guitar, keyboards, percussion, vocals; Rick Fenn – guitar, bass, keyboards, vocals; Graham Gouldman – bass, guitar, percussion, vocals; Vic Emerson – keyboards; Paul Burgess – drums, percussion, keyboards, vocals	Ten Out of 10 (1981)
Summer 1982 – summer 1983	Eric Stewart – guitar, keyboards, percussion, vocals; Rick Fenn – guitar, bass, keyboards, vocals; Graham Gouldman – bass, guitar, percussion, vocals; Vic Emerson – keyboards; Stuart Tosh – drums, percussion, vocals	Windows in the Jungle (1983)
Summer – October 1983	Eric Stewart – guitar, keyboards, percussion, vocals; Rick Fenn – guitar, bass, keyboards, vocals; Graham Gouldman – bass, guitar, percussion, vocals; Vic Emerson – keyboards; Stuart Tosh – drums, percussion, vocals; Jamie Lane – drums, percussion	none
Band inactive October 1983 – late 1991
Late 1991 – early 1992	Eric Stewart – keyboards, guitar, vocals; Graham Gouldman – guitar, vocals; Lol Creme – vocals; Kevin Godley – vocals	...Meanwhile (1992)
Early 1993 – early 1995	Eric Stewart – guitar, keyboards, vocals; Graham Gouldman – bass, guitar, vocals; Rick Fenn – guitar, bass, vocals; Stephen Pigott – keyboards; Stuart Tosh – percussion, drums, vocals (touring only); Gary Wallis – drums, percussion	Alive (1993); Mirror Mirror (1995)
Spring – summer 1995	Eric Stewart – guitar, keyboards, percussion, vocals; Graham Gouldman – bass, guitar, percussion, vocals; Rick Fenn – guitar, bass, vocals; Alan Park – keyboards; Stuart Tosh – drums, percussion, vocals; Geoff Dunn – drums, percussion	
Band inactive summer 1995 – 1999
1999–2007	Graham Gouldman – bass, guitar, percussion, vocals; Rick Fenn – guitar, bass, keyboards, vocals; Mick Wilson – guitar, percussion, vocals; Mike Stevens – keyboards, saxophone, vocals; Paul Burgess – drums, percussion, vocals	Clever Clogs: Live in Concert (2007)
2007–2011	Graham Gouldman – bass, guitar, percussion, vocals; Rick Fenn – guitar, bass, keyboards, vocals; Mick Wilson – guitar, percussion, vocals; Keith Hayman – keyboards, bass, guitar, vocals; Paul Burgess – drums, percussion, vocals	none
2011–2016	Graham Gouldman – bass, guitar, percussion, vocals; Rick Fenn – guitar, bass, keyboards, vocals; Mick Wilson – guitar, percussion, vocals; Mike Stevens – keyboards, saxophone, vocals; Paul Burgess – drums, percussion, vocals	none
2016 – December 2017	Graham Gouldman – bass, guitar, percussion, vocals; Rick Fenn – guitar, bass, keyboards, vocals; Mick Wilson – guitar, percussion, vocals; Keith Hayman – keyboards, bass, guitar, vocals; Paul Burgess – drums, percussion, vocals	none
December 2017 – July 2024	Graham Gouldman – bass, guitar, percussion, vocals; Rick Fenn – guitar, bass, keyboards, vocals; Iain Hornal – vocals. guitar, bass, keyboards, percussion; Keith Hayman – keyboards, bass, guitar, vocals; Paul Burgess – drums, percussion, vocals	none
July 2024 – October 2025	Graham Gouldman – bass, guitar, percussion, vocals; Rick Fenn – guitar, bass, keyboards, vocals; Andy Park – vocals, guitar, bass, percussion, keyboards; Keith Hayman – keyboards, bass, guitar, vocals; Paul Burgess – drums, percussion, vocals	none
October 2025 – present	Graham Gouldman – bass, guitar, percussion, vocals; Rick Fenn – guitar, bass, keyboards, vocals; Andy Park – vocals, guitar, bass, percussion, keyboards; Keith Hayman – keyboards, bass, guitar, vocals	none
