= 100cc =

Compilation album by 10cc
- Released: 1975
- Genres: Art rock; pop rock
- Length: 36:18
- Label: UK
- Producer: 10cc

10cc chronology
The Original Soundtrack (1975)	100cc (1975)	How Dare You! (1976)

Professional ratings
Review scores
Source	Rating
Allmusic	3.0/5 stars
Christgau's Record Guide	B−

100cc, also known as 100cc - Greatest Hits of 10cc , is a compilation album by the English rock band 10cc.

It was released in 1975 by UK Records, the band's original label, to capitalize on the then 10cc's recent departure to Mercury Records and band's success in the immediate aftermath of the release of their third album, The Original Soundtrack, and the "I'm Not in Love" single.

The UK edition of the compilation contains a selection of singles on the first side, while the second side contains all of the non-album b-sides from the first two albums' singles.

Around the same time "Waterfall" b/w "4% of Something" was released as a single by UK Records.

== Track listing ==
=== UK edition ===
Side one

1. "Rubber Bullets" (Kevin Godley, Lol Creme, Graham Gouldman) – 5:18
2. "Donna" (Godley, Creme) – 2:54
3. "The Dean and I" (Godley, Creme) – 3:03
4. "The Wall Street Shuffle" (Eric Stewart, Gouldman) – 4:02
5. "Silly Love" (Creme, Stewart) – 3:56

Side two

1. "Waterfall" (Stewart, Gouldman) – 3:41
2. "4% of Something" (Stewart, Creme) – 4:01
3. "Gismo My Way" (Stewart, Gouldman, Godley, Creme) – 3:44
4. "Hot Sun Rock" (Stewart, Gouldman) – 3:01
5. "Bee in My Bonnet" (Stewart, Gouldman) – 2:02
6. "18 Carat Man of Means" (Gouldman, Stewart, Godley, Creme) – 3:27

=== U.S. edition ===
Side one

1. "Old Wild Men" (Godley, Creme) – 3:18
2. "The Wall Street Shuffle" (Stewart, Gouldman) – 3:30
3. "Somewhere in Hollywood" (Godley, Creme) – 5:28
4. "Rubber Bullets" (Godley, Creme, Gouldman) – 4:41
5. "Waterfall" (Stewart, Gouldman) – 3:41

Side two

1. "The Worst Band in the World" (Creme, Gouldman) – 2:45
2. "Donna" (Godley, Creme) – 2:54
3. "The Dean and I" (Godley, Creme) – 3:03
4. "Fresh Air for My Momma" (Godley, Creme, Stewart) – 3:02
5. "Silly Love" (Creme, Stewart) – 3:56

== Personnel ==
- Eric Stewart – guitar, keyboards, vocals
- Graham Gouldman – bass, guitar, percussion, vocals
- Lol Creme – guitar, keyboards, percussion, vocals
- Kevin Godley – drums, percussion, vocals
