= Clever Clogs =

Live album by 10cc
- Released: 2008
- Recorded: March 2007
- Venues: Shepherd's Bush Empire (London, England)
- Genres: Progressive pop; pop rock; art rock
- Label: Proper

10cc chronology
Greatest Hits ... And More (2006)	Clever Clogs (2008)	Collected (2008)

DVD edition cover
- Original DVD edition featuring subcredit

Professional ratings
Review scores
Source	Rating
AllMusic	3.5/5 stars
Sea of Tranquility	4.5/5 stars

Clever Clogs (subtitled Live in Concert) is a live and video album by the English rock band 10cc, released in 2008 by Proper Records.

== Overview ==
The album was recorded and released by the 10cc touring band, led by the only original member Graham Gouldman, a fact highlighted by the sub-credit "featuring Graham Gouldman and friends" which appears on the album cover, with established 10cc members Rick Fenn and Paul Burgess together with Mick Wilson and Mike Stevens.

The 10cc touring band and the album are notable in featuring not only 10cc material, but also songs from Gouldman's song-writing and musical career, including Wax and GG/06 songs.

Clever Clogs also features original 10cc member Kevin Godley who makes a guest appearance and sings two songs. 'The album was produced and the live concert directed by Bafta winner Robin Bextor for New Wave Pictures.

The cover art for the album, with the new band's logo, was designed by long-time 10cc collaborator Storm Thorgerson.

== Release and reception ==
The live and video albums were originally released separately in 2008. The DVD edition included three additional songs not present on the CD version. In 2014 the album was reissued by Wienerworld Presentation as a separate CD and a CD+DVD pack.

== Track listing ==
All tracks composed by Graham Gouldman and Eric Stewart, except where indicated:

1. "The Wall Street Shuffle"
2. "The Things We Do for Love"
3. "Good Morning Judge"
4. "I'm Mandy Fly Me" (Gouldman, Stewart, Kevin Godley)
5. "Life Is a Minestrone" (Stewart, Lol Creme)
6. "Art for Art's Sake"
7. "Bus Stop" (Gouldman)
8. "No Milk Today" (Gouldman)
9. "Look Through Any Window" (Gouldman, Charles Silverman) DVD only
10. "For Your Love" (Gouldman)
11. "Old Wild Men" (Godley, Creme)
12. "BeautifulLoser.com" (Gouldman, Godley) DVD only
13. "Silly Love" (Stewart, Creme)
14. "Donna" (Godley, Creme)
15. "The Dean and I" (Godley, Creme)
16. "Bridge to Your Heart (Andrew Gold, Gouldman) DVD only
17. "I'm Not in Love"
18. "Dreadlock Holiday"
19. "Ready to Go Home" (Gouldman, Gold)
20. "Rubber Bullets" (Gouldman, Creme, Godley)

=== DVD Bonus Materials ===
1. Extended conversation with Graham Gouldman about the songs and how they were written
2. The Art of 10CC with Storm Thorgerson
3. Kevin Godley on stage with 10cc in Cardiff

== Personnel ==
- Graham Gouldman – vocals, bass guitar, guitar
- Mick Wilson – vocals, percussion, guitar
- Rick Fenn – vocals, lead guitar, bass guitar
- Paul Burgess – drums, percussion
- Mike Stevens – vocals, keyboards, saxophone, guitar, bass guitar
- Kevin Godley – vocals on "Old Wild Men" and "BeautifulLoser.com", percussion on "Rubber Bullets"
- Jess Bailey – piano on "BeautifulLoser.com"

== Charts ==
=== Video ===
Chart (2009)	Peak position
Netherlands MegaCharts	26
