= GG/06: EP - 1 =

EP by GG/06
- Released: 2008
- Genre: Progressive pop; pop rock; art rock
- Length: 32:13

Professional ratings
Review scores
Source	Rating
Sea of Tranquility	3.5/5 stars

GG/06: EP – 1 is an EP by British duo GG/06 released in 2008.

== Overview ==
GG/06 is a collaboration between Kevin Godley and Graham Gouldman of 10cc. According to Godley, the idea of working together again existed since the 1990s and was finally implemented in the mid-2000s. Godley explained:

In a nutshell ... unfinished business. In all the years we've known each other we've only written three pure, Godley-Gouldman songs. That, and a desire to find out if the music muscle still worked with someone I enjoyed and didn't have to spend weeks getting to know.

— Kevin Godley

The result of this collaboration was a number of tracks that were released under the name GG/06 from 2006 to 2008 mostly through the band's website with six tracks in total.

Godley described the music as darker and more adult in comparison to 10cc.

The song "Son of Man" samples the Hotlegs song "Neanderthal Man" and tells the story of its creation and the early days of the 10cc band members.

== Release ==
Aside from the release through the GG/06 website, the songs were featured on a number of 10cc compilation albums. Two songs, "Beautifulloser.com" and "Son of Man" were released on the 10cc compilation Greatest Hits ... And More in 2006.

A live version of "Beautifulloser.com" was featured on the 10cc 2008 video album Clever Clogs.

"Son of Man" and "Hooligan Crane" were featured in the 2017 10cc box set Before During After – The Story of 10cc.

In 2019, Godley created a video for the song "Son of Man" which was used as a stage intro for 10cc shows.

All the tracks from the EP were included on the digital deluxe edition of 10cc's compilation album The Things We Do for Love: The Ultimate Hits and Beyond. All but "Beautifulloser.com" were included on the two-CD version.

== Track listing ==
1. "The Same Road" – 3:56
2. "Johnny Hurts" – 4:22
3. "Beautifulloser.com" – 8:19
4. "Hooligan Crane" – 5:39
5. "Son of Man" – 4:59
6. "Barry's Shoes" – 4:58
