= One-Two-Five =

Single by 10cc

from the album Look Hear?
- B-side: "Only Child"
- Released: 7 March 1980
- Genre: Progressive pop; sophisti-pop; art rock; pop rock; soft rock
- Length: 4:01 (single version); 5:21 (album version)
- Label: Mercury
- Songwriter(s): Eric Stewart; Graham Gouldman
- Producer(s): 10cc

10cc singles chronology
"For You and I" (1978)	"One-Two-Five" (1980)	"It Doesn't Matter at All" (1980)

"One-Two-Five" is a song by 10cc released as a first single in 1980 from the album Look Hear?. It is a reference to disco's 125 beats per minute tempo.

== Release and promotion ==
"One-Two-Five" was released as a first single outside America ahead of the album Look Hear?. The song was promoted by a music video directed by Russell Mulcahy based on the Eric Stewart's idea of 'disco-ectomy'.

The single failed to chart in the band's native UK, which was the first time since 1974's The Original Soundtrack that a lead single wouldn't become a hit. However, the song became a top 10 hit in Norway.

== Personnel ==
- Eric Stewart – lead vocals, electric guitar
- Graham Gouldman – second lead vocals, bass, electric guitar
- Rick Fenn – electric guitar
- Duncan Mackay – Yamaha CS-80 synthesizer
- Paul Burgess – drums, percussion
- Stuart Tosh — percussion, backing vocals

== Chart performance ==
Chart (1980)	Peak position
Australia (Kent Music Report)	82
Netherlands (Single Top 100)	29
Norway (VG-lista)	9
