= Strawberry Bubblegum: A Collection of Pre-10cc Strawberry Studio Recordings 1969–1972 =

Compilation album by 10cc
- Released: 2003
- Recorded: 1969–1972
- Studio: Strawberry (Stockport)
- Genre: Rock
- Length: 1:14:25
- Label: Castle Music
- Producers: Strawberry Productions; Jerry Kasenetz; Jeff Katz; Eric Stewart; Graham Gouldman; Lol Creme; Ritchie Cordell

10cc chronology
The Very Best of 10cc (1997)	Strawberry Bubblegum: A Collection of Pre-10cc Strawberry Studio Recordings 1969–1972 (2003)	Greatest Hits ... And More (2006)

Professional ratings
Review scores
Source	Rating
AllMusic	4/5 stars

Strawberry Bubblegum: A Collection of Pre-10cc Strawberry Studio Recordings 1969–1972 is a compilation of songs recorded at Strawberry Studios in Stockport, England, by the four musicians – Graham Gouldman, Eric Stewart, Kevin Godley and Lol Creme – who in 1972 would form the British pop band 10cc, along with occasional guest vocalists.

== Overview ==
The compilation includes several singles by future 10cc members’ related bands, which include: a single by Festival "Today" b/w "Warm Me" (early incarnation of 10cc) with the former song being re-recording of the Hotlegs track from Song, the single by Doctor Father "Umbopo" b/w "Roll On", an alter ego of Hotlegs (Kevin Godley, Lol Creme and Eric Stewart), three singles by Peter Cowap, former Gouldman’s acquaintance from Herman’s Hermits, with additional single by Grumble, a Peter Cowap led band that included all of future 10cc members, two singles recorded for Manchester football clubs: "Willie Morgan" b/w "Travellin Man" for United and "Boys in Blue" b/w "Funky City" for City.

Other records on the album include various singles with and without b-sides by different bands and musicians recorded at Strawberry Studios, including songs done for the American bubblegum production team of Super K Productions, by whom Gouldman was employed as a writer during this time.

On several tracks Graham Gouldman is credited under the pseudonym of S. Hillary.

The compilation was reissued as part of 2017 box set Before During After - The Story of 10cc with the exact tracklisting and running order minus four tracks: "Come On Plane" by Silver Fleet, "Susan’s Tuba" by Freddie and the Dreamers, "When He Comes" by Fighter Squadron and hidden track "Santa Claus" by Leslie Crowther.

== Track listing ==
No.	Title	Credited Performer	Writer	Lead vocals	Producer	Year	Length
1.	"Sausalito (Is the Place to Go)"	Ohio Express	Graham Gouldman	Graham Gouldman	Jeffry Katz, Jerry Kasenetz	1969	2:13
2.	"Come on Plane"	Silver Fleet	Gouldman, Jerry Kasenetz, Jeffry Katz	Kevin Godley	Jeffry Katz, Jerry Kasenetz, Gouldman	1971	2:31
3.	"Tampa, Florida"	Peter Cowap	Peter Cowap, Gouldman	Peter Cowap	Strawberry Production	1971	2:29
4.	"Have You Ever Been to Georgia?"	Garden Odyssey	Gouldman		Stewart, Gouldman	1972	3:20
5.	"Travellin Man"	Tristar Airbus	Gouldman	Gouldman	Strawberry Production	1972	2:14
6.	"Crickets"	Peter Cowap	Cowap, Hillary	Cowap	Stewart	1970	3:13
7.	"Susan's Tuba"	Freddie and the Dreamers	Ritchie Cordell, Gouldman	Freddie Garrity	Ritchie Cordell, Gouldman	1971	2:17
8.	"Today"	Festival	Kevin Godley, Lol Creme	Godley	Strawberry Production	1972	4:18
9.	"Umbopo"	Doctor Father	Godley, Creme	Godley	Creme	1970	5:30
10.	"Safari"	Peter Cowap	Gouldman, Cowap	Cowap	Strawberry Production	1971	2:18
11.	"Da Doo Ron Ron"	Grumble	Ellie Greenwich, Jeff Barry, Phil Spector	Lol Creme	Strawberry Production	1973	3:04
12.	"The Joker"	Garden Odyssey	Gouldman, Greenfield		Stewart, Gouldman	1972	2:35
13.	"Funky City"	Manchester City FC	Godley, Creme, Gouldman	Creme	Strawberry Production	1972	2:26
14.	"Man with the Golden Gun"	Peter Cowap	Cowap, Gouldman	Cowap	Strawberry Production	1971	2:39
15.	"When He Comes"	Fighter Squadron	Gouldman, Katz, Kasenetz	Godley	Gouldman, Katz, Kasenetz	1971	3:37
16.	"Roll On"	Doctor Father	Godley, Eric Stewart, Creme	Eric Stewart	Creme	1970	4:43
17.	"Wicked Melinda"	Peter Cowap	Cowap, Hillary	Cowap	Stewart	1970	3:29
18.	"Willie Morgan"	Tristar Airbus	Jeff Smith, Gouldman	Jeff Smith	Strawberry Production	1972	2:49
19.	"Pig Bin an' Gone"	Grumble	Stewart, Creme, Gouldman, Godley	Instrumental	Strawberry Production	1973	4:01
20.	"Warm Me"	Festival	Gouldman, Stewart	Stewart	Strawberry Production	1972	2:01
21.	"Oh Solomon"	Peter Cowap	Gouldman, Cowap	Cowap	Strawberry Production	1971	2:53
22.	"Boys in Blue"	Manchester City FC	Godley, Creme, Gouldman		Strawberry Production	1972	2:34
23.	"There Ain't No Umbopo"	Crazy Elephant	Godley, Creme	Godley	Cordell, Gouldman	1970	3:00
24.	"Santa Claus" (hidden track)	Leslie Crowther	S. Hilary		Hit Factory Production	1970	2:37
