= Silly Love =

Single by 10cc

from the album Sheet Music
- B-side: "The Sacro-Iliac"
- Released: August 1974
- Studio: Strawberry Studios, Stockport, Cheshire, England
- Genre: Rock
- Length: 4:01
- Label: UK Records
- Songwriters: Lol Creme; Eric Stewart
- Producer: 10cc

10cc singles chronology
"The Wall Street Shuffle" (1974)	"Silly Love" (1974)	"Life Is a Minestrone" (1975)

"Silly Love" is a song recorded by the English rock band 10cc released as the third and final single from the album Sheet Music through UK Records in 1974.

== Personnel ==
- Lol Creme – lead vocals, rhythm guitar, backing vocals
- Eric Stewart – vocals, lead guitar, electric guitar, grand piano, backing vocals
- Kevin Godley – vocals, drums
- Graham Gouldman – bass guitar, backing vocals

== Chart performance ==
=== Weekly charts ===
Chart (1974)	Peak position
Belgium (Ultratop 50 Flanders)	20
Netherlands (Single Top 100)	7
UK Singles (Official Charts)	24

=== Year-end charts ===
Chart (1974)	Rank
Netherlands (Single Top 100)	84
