= 10cc (album) =

Studio album by 10cc
- Released: July 1973
- Recorded: 1972–1973
- Studios: Strawberry Studios, Stockport, England
- Genres: Art rock; pop rock; glam rock
- Length: 34:28
- Label: UK
- Producer: 10cc

10cc chronology
10cc (1973)	Sheet Music (1974)

Singles from 10cc
- 1. "Donna" Released: September 1972; 2. "Johnny, Don't Do It" Released: December 1972; 3. "Rubber Bullets" Released: March 1973; 4. "The Dean and I"" Released: August 1973; 5. "Headline Hustler" Released: March 1974 (US)

Professional ratings
Review scores
Source	Rating
Allmusic	4.0/5 stars
Christgau's Record Guide	B+

10cc is the debut album by the British rock band 10cc, first released in 1973. It was recorded at Strawberry Studios in Stockport, which was part-owned by guitarist and engineer Eric Stewart, and released on Jonathan King's UK Records label. The album reached number 36 in the UK Albums Chart.

== Release and promotion ==
Three of its four UK singles reached the Top 10 in the charts, including the Number One hit "Rubber Bullets", which also topped the chart in Australia. The fifth single "Headline Hustler" was released only in the American market to promote a tour in the USA.

The closing track, "Fresh Air for My Mama", was a reworking of "You Didn't Like It Because You Didn't Think of It", the B-side of 1970's "Neanderthal Man", an international hit by the band under its former name of Hotlegs.

Some versions of the album have an altered running order.

The 2000 CD reissue of the album featured all the b-sides of the album's singles. The album in its entirety along with 2000's bonus cuts appeared, along with 10cc's second album, "Sheet Music" and all its released bonus cuts, on 2004 10cc – The Complete UK Recordings, on Varèse Sarabande Records.

== Critical reception ==
Reviewing in Christgau's Record Guide: Rock Albums of the Seventies (1981), Robert Christgau wrote: "If you only know the forty-five-rpm version of 'Rubber Bullets,' then you missed their best rhyme: 'balls and chains' with 'balls and brains.' A calculated, devilishly clever version of what the Beach Boys ought to be doing. Or the Bonzo Dog Band should have done. Or something."

Record World said of "Headline Hustler" that "'Paperback Writer' goes the daily route. Englishmen take on Beatles-ish overtones to rock out their saga of a budding Jack Anderson."

== Track listing ==
Side one
No.	Title	Writer(s)	Length
1.	"Johnny, Don't Do It"	Lol Creme; Graham Gouldman; Kevin Godley	3:36
2.	"Sand in My Face"	Creme; Gouldman; Godley	3:36
3.	"Donna"	Creme; Godley	2:53
4.	"The Dean and I"	Creme; Godley	3:03
5.	"Headline Hustler"	Eric Stewart; Gouldman	3:31

Side two
No.	Title	Writer(s)	Length
6.	"Speed Kills"	Stewart; Creme; Gouldman; Godley	3:47
7.	"Rubber Bullets"	Creme; Gouldman; Godley	5:15
8.	"The Hospital Song"	Creme; Godley	2:41
9.	"Ships Don't Disappear in the Night (Do They?)"	Stewart; Gouldman	3:04
10.	"Fresh Air for My Mama"	Stewart; Creme; Godley	3:04

=== German 1993 CD re-release bonus track ===
Side two
No.	Title	Writer(s)	Length
11.	"18 Carat Man of Means"	Godley; Creme; Gouldman; Stewart	3:27

=== 2000 Repertoire CD reissue bonus tracks ===
No.	Title	Writer(s)	Length
11.	"Hot Sun Rock" (instrumental)	Stewart; Gouldman	3:01
12.	"4% of Something"	Stewart; Creme	4:01
13.	"Waterfall"	Stewart; Gouldman	3:44
14.	"Bee in My Bonnet"	Stewart; Gouldman	2:03
15.	"Rubber Bullets" (single version)	Godley; Creme; Gouldman	4:09

== Personnel ==
10cc

- Eric Stewart – lead electric guitar, slide guitar, Moog synthesizer, vocals
- Lol Creme – acoustic guitar, electric guitar, grand piano, synthesizer, Mellotron, percussion, vocals
- Graham Gouldman – bass, acoustic guitar, Dobro guitar, electric guitar, tambourine, vocals
- Kevin Godley – drums, percussion, vocals

== Charts ==
=== Weekly charts ===
Chart (1973)	Peak position
Australia (Kent Music Report)	43
UK Albums (Official Charts)	36

== Certifications ==
Region	Certification	Certified units/sales
United Kingdom (BPI)	Silver	60,000^{^}
^{^} Shipments figures based on certification alone.
