= Look Hear? =

Studio album by 10cc
- Released: 28 March 1980
- Recorded: August – December 1979
- Studios: Strawberry Studio South, Dorking, Surrey
- Genres: Rock; art rock; pop rock; art pop
- Length: 45:06
- Labels: Mercury (UK original release); 7T's (UK 2008 reissue); Warner Bros. (U.S.)
- Producer: 10cc

10cc chronology
Greatest Hits 1972–1978 (1979)	Look Hear? (1980)	Ten Out of 10 (1981)

Singles from Look Hear?
- 1. "One-Two-Five" Released: 7 March 1980; 2. "It Doesn't Matter at All" Released: 23 May 1980

U.S. cover
- U.S. release of Look Hear?

Professional ratings
Review scores
Source	Rating
Allmusic	3/5 stars

Look Hear? is the seventh studio album by 10cc, released in 1980.

== Overview ==
The album was recorded after a long break the band had to take due to Eric Stewart's car accident in January 1979 that left him with blindness in one eye and temporary hearing loss in one ear. Like previous albums, it was recorded at the band's Strawberry Studios South in Dorking, Surrey.

At the time of the recording Graham Gouldman was going through a divorce, which was reflected in the songs that he wrote for the album: "How'm I Ever Gonna Say Goodbye" and "I Hate to Eat Alone". These two songs had little to no contribution from Eric Stewart in the studio, only percussion on "I Hate to Eat Alone" and nothing at all on "How'm I Ever Gonna Say Goodbye". Like the previous 10cc album, Bloody Tourists, Look Hear? featured songwriting contributions from other members of the band and the album was the first by 10cc since the departure of Godley and Creme to include songs written by neither Graham Gouldman nor Eric Stewart.

Around the time of the sessions for Look Hear? Eric Stewart started recording a soundtrack for the film Girls and one of the songs recorded and intended for Look Hear?, "Make the Pieces Fit", was eventually released on Stewart's solo album.

The cover art, created by Hipgnosis, led to speculation that the album was titled Are You Normal and underwent significant alteration for the album's U.S. release: the prominent display of the words "Are you normal" was replaced by a photo of a sheep relaxing on a beach, an image that was used as an insert on the original release of the album.

== Release and reception ==
The album was the band's first for their new label in the U.S., Warner Bros. Records. In the review of May 3, 1980 Billboard's observer noted that "the departure of Lol Creme and Kevin Godley from the band some time ago has not proven disastrous as this effort shows its creative juices are still flowing" and this album is full of "wit, charm and a pop sensibility."

Two singles were lifted from the album: "One-Two-Five (edit)"/"Only Child" and "It Doesn't Matter at All"/"From Rochdale to Ocho Rios". While the singles failed to chart in the U.K., "One-Two-Five" fared better in Europe, peaking at #9 in Norway. In the U.S. only "It Doesn't Matter at All" was released (B-side changed to "Strange Lover") but failed to chart.

Look Hear? reached #35 in the UK and #180 in the United States, disappointing positions compared to previous 10cc albums. However, the album performed better elsewhere, reaching #3 in Norway and top 20 and 30 in Sweden and the Netherlands respectively.

Both Gouldman and Stewart would later express their disappointment with the album's lukewarm reception but they would also acknowledge that their hearts might not have been in it. At the time of its making, Stewart was still recovering from an automobile accident. They also admit that the hiatus the band were forced to go through following Stewart's accident was the beginning of the end and that musical tastes had shifted in the interim.

The album was reissued in 2008 on CD with bonus tracks from "One-Two-Five" single.

== Track listing ==
Side one
No.	Title	Writer(s)	Lead vocals	Length
1.	"One-Two-Five"	Eric Stewart, Graham Gouldman	Stewart and Gouldman	5:21
2.	"Welcome to the World"	Duncan Mackay, Rick Fenn	Stewart and Gouldman	3:43
3.	"How'm I Ever Gonna Say Goodbye"	Gouldman, Fenn	Gouldman and Fenn	3:38
4.	"Don't Send We Back"	Fenn	Fenn	3:20
5.	"I Took You Home"	Stewart	Stewart	5:18

Side two
No.	Title	Writer(s)	Lead vocals	Length
6.	"It Doesn't Matter at All"	Stewart, Gouldman	Stewart	4:01
7.	"Dressed to Kill"	Stewart, Gouldman	Gouldman	3:26
8.	"Lovers Anonymous"	Stewart, Gouldman	Stewart	5:06
9.	"I Hate to Eat Alone"	Gouldman	Gouldman	2:57
10.	"Strange Lover"	Stewart, Gouldman	Stewart	3:44
11.	"L.A. Inflatable"	Stewart, Gouldman	Stewart	4:32
Total length:				45:06

Bonus tracks on the 2008 CD reissue
No.	Title	Writer(s)	Lead vocal	Length
12.	"One-Two-Five" (Edited Single Version)"	Stewart, Gouldman	Stewart and Gouldman	4:04
13.	"Only Child"	Stewart, Gouldman	Gouldman	3:13
Total length:				52:23

== Personnel ==
- Eric Stewart – lead vocals, guitars, electric piano, vocoder, slide lead guitar, marracas, percussion
- Graham Gouldman – lead vocals, bass, guitars, congas
- Rick Fenn – vocals, guitars, lead vocals (4), co-lead vocals (3)
- Duncan Mackay – Yamaha CS80 synthesizer, organ, Hohner Clavinet duo, harpsichord, vocoder, tubular bells, electric piano, grand piano
- Paul Burgess – drums, percussion, marimba, timpani
- Stuart Tosh – backing vocals, percussion, timpani

== Charts ==
Chart (1980)	Peak position
Australia (Kent Music Report)	38
Canada Top Albums/CDs (RPM)	72
Dutch Albums (Album Top 100)	21
German Albums (Offizielle Top 100)	40
New Zealand Albums (RMNZ)	40
Norwegian Albums (VG-lista)	3
Swedish Albums (Sverigetopplistan)	14
UK Albums (Official Charts)	35
US Billboard 200	180
