= The Wall Street Shuffle =

Single by 10cc

from the album Sheet Music
- B-side: "Gismo My Way"
- Released: 24 May 1974
- Recorded: 1974
- Studio: Strawberry Studios, Stockport, Cheshire, England
- Genre: Rock; pop
- Length: 3:54
- Label: UK Records
- Songwriters: Eric Stewart; Graham Gouldman
- Producer: 10cc

10cc singles chronology
| "The Worst Band in the World" (1974) | "The Wall Street Shuffle" (1974) | "Silly Love" (1974) |

Official Audio
- "The Wall Street Shuffle" on YouTube

"The Wall Street Shuffle" is a single by the British pop/rock band 10cc, released in 1974 on the UK Records label, from the band's 1974 album Sheet Music. It was the most successful single to be released from the album, reaching No. 10 on the UK chart.

The song features a classic rock riff and lyrics that deal with Wall Street and the economy. It features several topical cultural references.

Record World said that this "economic dance lesson [is] sure to break the clever British band top 40."

== Track listing ==
=== 7" vinyl ===
Side one
| No. | Title | Writer(s) | Length |
|---|---|---|---|
| 1. | "The Wall Street Shuffle" | Eric Stewart, Graham Gouldman | 3:34 |

Side two
| No. | Title | Writer(s) | Length |
|---|---|---|---|
| 1. | "Gismo My Way" | Stewart, Gouldman, Kevin Godley, Lol Creme | 3:40 |

== Personnel ==
For "The Wall Street Shuffle":

- Eric Stewart – lead guitar, vocals, electric piano, grand piano, Mellotron, organ
- Lol Creme – rhythm guitar
- Graham Gouldman – bass, acoustic guitar, rhythm guitar, percussion
- Kevin Godley – drums, percussion

== Chart performance ==
=== Weekly charts ===
| Chart (1974) | Peak position |
|---|---|
| UK Singles Chart | 10 |
| Belgium (Ultratop 50 Flanders) | 4 |
| Canada (RPM) | 87 |
| German Singles Chart | 43 |
| Irish Singles Chart | 9 |
| Netherlands (Single Top 100) | 1 |
| US Billboard Hot 100 | 103 |

=== Year-end charts ===
| Chart (1974) | Rank |
|---|---|
| Belgium (Ultratop 50 Flanders) | 49 |
| Netherlands (Single Top 100) | 9 |

== Covers ==
ABBA singer Anni-Frid Lyngstad recorded a Swedish version called "Guld och gröna ängar" ("Gold and Green Meadows" with Swedish lyrics by Owe Junsjö) on her solo album Frida ensam (1975).
