= Donna (10cc song) =

Single by 10cc

from the album 10cc
- B-side: "Hot Sun Rock"
- Released: 23 September 1972
- Genre: Art rock; doo-wop (parody)
- Length: 2:53
- Label: UK Records
- Songwriters: Lol Creme; Kevin Godley

10cc singles chronology
"Donna" (1972)	"Johnny Don't Do It" (1972)

Music video
- "Donna" on YouTube at TopPop

"Donna" is the first single by British art pop band 10cc. Released in 1972, it peaked at No. 2 on the UK Singles Chart in October 1972, spending a total of 13 weeks on the chart. The song was written by Lol Creme and Kevin Godley.

== Overview ==
"Donna", a parody of doo-wop songs (see also "Donna" by Ritchie Valens), was originally written as a potential B-side to the song "Waterfall". The song features sharp contrasts between falsetto in the chorus by Lol Creme and lower register downbeat vocals by Kevin Godley in the verse. The melody line is similar to the Beatles 1969 song "Oh! Darling".

Band member Eric Stewart has said: "We knew it had something. We only knew of one person who was mad enough to release it, and that was Jonathan King." The song was subsequently released on King's UK Records label. The band had considered releasing it under the name of "Doctor Father Part Two", resurrecting a band name they had used for their 1970 song "Umbopo". Band manager Harvey Lisberg said there was "a vague sort of plan at that time to keep on bringing out records under different names until they got a hit".

Upon release of the single in the U.S., Record World said that "This Frank Zappa-ish production is currently a top record in England and is silly enough to make it here."

== Chart performance ==
=== Weekly charts ===
Chart (1972)	Peak position
Australia (Kent Music Report)	53
Ireland (IRMA)	2
France (SNEP)	7
UK Singles (Official Charts)	2

Chart (1973)	Peak position
Belgium (Ultratop 50 Flanders)	4
Netherlands (Single Top 100)	2
New Zealand (Listener)	10

=== Year-end charts ===
Chart (1973)	Rank
Belgium (Ultratop 50 Flanders)	26
Netherlands (Single Top 100)	20
UK	26
