= The Dean and I =

Single by 10cc

from the album 10cc
- B-side: "Bee in My Bonnet"
- Released: 25 August 1973
- Genre: Pop
- Length: 2:46 (single version); 3:03 (album version)
- Label: UK Records
- Songwriters: Lol Creme; Kevin Godley
- Producer: 10cc

10cc singles chronology
"Rubber Bullets" (1973)	"The Dean and I" (1973)	"The Worst Band in the World" (1974)

"The Dean and I" is a song by the art rock/pop band 10cc, from their 1973 eponymous debut album, written by Lol Creme and Kevin Godley. The song was released as the fourth single from the album in August 1973 and peaked at #10 on the UK Singles Chart. The single reached the top of the Irish Singles Chart on 20 September 1973.

== Music and lyrics ==
The first real lines of the song are "Hey, kids, let me tell you how I met your mom. We were dancing and romancing at the senior prom". The epic poem Paradise Lost by John Milton is mentioned in the lyric: "Now who would have guessed Milton's Paradise Lost could be found."

The song has been considered a parody of such sock hop songs as by Jerry Lee Lewis "High School Confidential", with the teenage romance ending in a midlife crisis and divorce.

== Release ==
The album version of the song is slightly longer than the single version. Most of the material cut for the single release is from the introduction where the lyric on the album "Humdrum days and a humdrum ways" is sung repeatedly. The single version of the song can be found on the compilation Greatest Hits ... And More (2006)

A 1974 performance of the song appears on Don Kirshner's Rock Concert. The audio portion of a vintage mini-documentary chronicling the recording of the song in the studio was included in the limited edition 10cc box set "Tenology" in 2012.

The single released in Germany featured an alternative picture sleeve with the "balloons and bomb" logo which had been used for the album.

The B-side "Bee in My Bonnet", by Stewart and Gouldman, was not included on the original album, but was included on the later re-issues of the album.

== Personnel ==
- Lol Creme – lead and backing vocals, electric and acoustic guitars, Fender Rhodes electric piano, Moog synthesizer
- Kevin Godley – co-lead and backing vocals, drums, sound effects
- Eric Stewart – electric lead & rhythm guitars, backing vocals
- Graham Gouldman – bass, tambourine, backing vocals
