= Sheet Music (10cc album) =

Studio album by 10cc
- Released: 24 May 1974
- Recorded: January 1974
- Studios: Strawberry Studios, Stockport, Cheshire, England
- Genres: Art pop; pop rock; avant-pop; progressive pop
- Length: 37:12
- Label: UK
- Producer: 10cc

10cc chronology
10cc (1973)	Sheet Music (1974)	The Original Soundtrack (1975)

Singles from Sheet Music
- 1. "The Worst Band in the World" Released: January 1974; 2. "The Wall Street Shuffle" Released: May 1974; 3. "Silly Love" Released: August 1974

Sheet Music is the second album by the English rock band 10cc. It was released in 1974 on UK records (No: UKAL 1007), and yielded the hit singles "The Wall Street Shuffle" and "Silly Love". The album reached No. 9 in the UK and No. 81 in the United States.

== Production ==
The album was produced by 10cc, engineered and mixed by Eric Stewart. It includes all possible combinations of co-writing duos between Stewart, Gouldman, Godley and Creme, which the band used to experiment and explore new creativity while making the album.

In a 2006 interview, ex-drummer Kevin Godley said: "We'd really started to explode creatively and didn't recognise any boundaries. We were buzzing on each other and exploring our joint and individual capabilities. Lots of excitement and energy at those sessions and, more important, an innocence that was open to anything."

While 10cc were recording their album during the night, Paul McCartney was using the Strawberry Studios in the daytime to produce his brother Mike's album McGear. Graham Gouldman remarked how the band used Paul's drum kit for their album, and how Paul's influence was certainly felt while making the record.

The subject of the song "Clockwork Creep", which ends side one of the album, is a bomb aboard a jumbo jet describing the final minute in its countdown to detonation.

== Release ==
Three singles were taken from the album, all of them released in 1974. The lead single "The Worst Band in the World" failed to chart, while the follow-up "The Wall Street Shuffle" made #10 in the UK and #2 in the Netherlands. The third single "Silly Love" made #24 in the UK.

The album was reissued several times with different b-sides from the 10cc and Sheet Music singles as bonus tracks. The most recent version is 2007 UK reissue which combines only Sheet Music related bonus tracks.

The album in its entirety—including all of the bonus cuts from the 1993 release and the 2007 release—appears, along with 10cc's first album 10cc and all its released bonus cuts, on 10cc - The Complete UK Recordings on Varèse Sarabande Records.

== Reception ==
Professional ratings
Review scores
Source	Rating
AllMusic	3.5/5 stars
Christgau's Record Guide	B
Tom Hull	C+

Charley Walters in his 1974 Rolling Stone review felt that the band had "concocted standard pop into their own inventive, even sophisticated, art", and that while not typical pop music it would be popular with AM-oriented DJs and their listeners. Billboard felt the band had a "certain zany feeling", but that "their songs are far from silly when carefully listened to" and they had "some of the most innovative vocal techniques and instrumental arrangements around".

=== Legacy ===
Dave Thompson, in a summary of the album for Allmusic, felt that it had staying power and that it was "perhaps the most widely adventurous album of what would become a wildly adventurous year". George Durbalau in 1001 Albums You Must Hear Before You Die felt it was "a piece of well-crafted, highly idiosyncratic pop" and was "in a word, inventive".

Kevin Godley, Graham Gouldman and Eric Stewart have subsequently referred to Sheet Music as 10cc's zenith throughout their career.

Graham Gouldman performed the album live in its entirety in 2015 with his 10cc touring band.

Producer J Dilla sampled the track "The Worst Band In The World" on his track "Workinonit" from 2006's Donuts. In 2020, after J Dilla's track was used in two Dave Chappelle Netflix specials, Music Sales Corporation and Man-Ken Music, Ltd. (the latter of which owns the 10cc composition) sued Universal Polygram International Publishing Inc. and E.P.H.C.Y. Publishing, for copyright infringement

== Track listing ==
Side one
No.	Title	Writer(s)	Lead vocals	Length
1.	"The Wall Street Shuffle"	Eric Stewart; Graham Gouldman	Stewart	3:54
2.	"The Worst Band in the World"	Lol Creme; Gouldman	Creme	2:49
3.	"Hotel"	Creme; Kevin Godley	Godley	4:54
4.	"Old Wild Men"	Creme; Godley	Stewart and Godley	3:21
5.	"Clockwork Creep"	Creme; Godley	Creme, Godley, Stewart and Gouldman	2:46

Side two
No.	Title	Writer(s)	Lead vocals	Length
6.	"Silly Love"	Stewart; Creme	Creme and Stewart with Godley	4:01
7.	"Somewhere in Hollywood"	Creme; Godley	Godley with Creme	6:39
8.	"Baron Samedi"	Stewart; Gouldman	Stewart with Godley	3:46
9.	"The Sacro-Iliac"	Gouldman; Godley	Gouldman and Godley with Creme	2:33
10.	"Oh Effendi"	Stewart; Godley	Godley and Stewart	2:49

=== 1993 CD release bonus track ===
1. "Waterfall" (Gouldman, Stewart) – 3:43

=== 2002 Japanese CD reissue bonus tracks ===
1. "Bee in My Bonnet" (Gouldman, Stewart) – 2:01
2. "Gismo My Way" (instrumental) (Godley, Creme, Gouldman, Stewart) – 3:43
3. "18 Carat Man of Means" (Godley, Creme, Gouldman, Stewart) – 3:27

=== 2007 UK CD reissue bonus tracks ===
No.	Title	Writer(s)	Lead vocals	Length
1.	"18 Carat Man of Means"	Godley; Creme; Gouldman; Stewart	Stewart with Godley and Creme	3:27
2.	"Gismo My Way"	Godley; Creme; Gouldman; Stewart	instrumental	3:43
3.	"The Worst Band in the World (Radio Version)"	Creme; Gouldman	Creme with Gouldman	2:49

== Personnel ==
Credits sourced from the original album liner notes.

- Eric Stewart – lead (1, 4, 8), co-lead (5, 6, 10) and backing vocals (3, 5–7, 10), electric piano (1, 8), grand piano (1, 6), lead guitar (1–4, 6, 8, 10), mellotron (1), organ (1), electric guitar (3, 6, 9), slide guitar (4, 7), "phase" guitar (7), Gizmo (8), marimba (8)
- Lol Creme – lead (2, 5, 6), co-lead (7, 9) and backing vocals (1, 3–10), electric guitar (1, 2, 4, 6, 10), grand piano (2, 5, 7, 8), electric piano (2, 5, 7, 9), percussion (2), acoustic guitar (3), lead guitar (3, 7, 8), mellotron (3, 8), synthesizer (3, 4, 7), Gizmo (4), whistles (5), maracas (10)
- Graham Gouldman – lead (9) and backing vocals (2–6, 8–10), bass guitar (1–3, 5–10), acoustic guitar (1, 3, 9, 10), electric guitar (1, 5, 8), percussion (1–3, 8, 9), tambourine (4, 10), autoharp (4), bouzouki (5), tubular bells (7), sleigh bells (10)
- Kevin Godley – lead (3, 4, 7, 10), co-lead (5, 6, 8, 9) and backing vocals (2–5, 7–10), drums (1, 2, 5–10), percussion (1, 2, 4, 5, 7, 9, 10), congas (3, 8), timbales (3), rhythm skulls (3), tap dancing (7), bongos (8)

== Charts ==
Chart (1974)	Peak position
Australia (Kent Music Report)	87
United Kingdom (Official Charts Company)	9
United States (Billboard 200)	81
