= The Original Soundtrack =

Studio album by 10cc
- Released: 7 March 1975
- Recorded: 1974
- Studios: Strawberry Studios (Stockport, Greater Manchester, England)
- Genres: Art rock; progressive pop; soft rock
- Length: 41:46
- Label: Mercury
- Producer: 10cc

10cc chronology
Sheet Music (1974)	The Original Soundtrack (1975)	100cc (1975)

Singles from The Original Soundtrack
- 1. "Life Is a Minestrone" Released: 28 March 1975; 2. "I'm Not in Love" Released: 23 May 1975

The Original Soundtrack is the third studio album by the English rock band 10cc. It was released in 1975 and peaked at number three on the UK Albums Chart. The Original Soundtrack includes the singles "Life Is a Minestrone", and "I'm Not in Love", the band's most popular song.

The album received good reviews when originally released on LP, 8-Track and cassette by Mercury Records in March 1975. It was ranked number 976 in All-Time Top 1000 Albums (2000).

== Background ==
The album was recorded and produced by the band at Strawberry Studios in 1974 with Eric Stewart engineering and mixing. The album was the first to be released by Mercury Records after signing the band for $1 million in February 1975. The catalyst for the deal was that the record executives had heard one song – "I'm Not in Love". Eric Stewart recalled:

At that point in time we were still on Jonathan King's label, but struggling. We were absolutely skint, the lot of us, we were really struggling seriously, and Philips Phonogram wanted to do a deal with us. They wanted to buy Jonathan King's contract. I rang them. I said come and have a listen to what we've done, come and have a listen to this track. And they came up and they freaked, and they said, "This is a masterpiece. How much money, what do you want? What sort of a contract do you want? We'll do anything, we'll sign it." On the strength of that one song, we did a five-year deal with them for five albums and they paid us a serious amount of money.

The rest of the album, which was already complete, was released just weeks later. They had worked on the album for about 67 weeks beforehand.

The artwork was designed by Hipgnosis and illustrated by artist Humphrey Ocean.

== Release ==
The album has been reissued on several occasions with bonus tracks including b-sides and single edits and has been remastered.

== Reception ==
Professional ratings
Review scores
Source	Rating
Allmusic	4.5/5 stars
Christgau's Record Guide	D+

The Original Soundtrack was a critical and commercial success reaching No. 3 in the UK and No. 15 in the US

Ken Barnes gave the album a rave review in Rolling Stone, commenting, "Musically there's more going on than in ten Yes albums, yet it's generally as accessible as a straight pop band (though less so than the two preceding 10cc LPs)." He particularly praised the album for being ambitious without being excessive or pretentious, and for its lyrical content.

Village Voice critic Robert Christgau panned the album, remarking of the song "I'm Not in Love": "stretching your only decent melody (a non-satirical love song) over six tedious minutes, is that a joke?"

The first single "Life Is a Minestrone" was another UK Top 10 for the band, peaking at No. 7. Their biggest success came with the song that sold the album, "I'm Not in Love", which gave the band their second UK No. 1 in June 1975, staying there for two weeks. The song also provided them with their first major US chart success when the song reached No. 2.

== Track listing ==
Side one
No.	Title	Writer(s)	Lead vocals	Length
1.	"Une nuit a Paris": 1. "One Night in Paris"; 2. "The Same Night in Paris"; 3. "Later That Same Night in Paris"	Lol Creme; Kevin Godley	Stewart, Creme, Gouldman, and Godley	8:40
2.	"I'm Not in Love"	Eric Stewart; Graham Gouldman	Stewart	6:08
3.	"Blackmail"	Stewart; Gouldman	Stewart, Creme, Gouldman, and Godley	4:28
Total length:				19:16

Side two
No.	Title	Writer(s)	Lead vocals	Length
4.	"The Second Sitting for the Last Supper"	Stewart; Creme; Gouldman; Godley	Stewart	4:25
5.	"Brand New Day"	Creme; Godley	Godley and Stewart	4:04
6.	"Flying Junk"	Stewart; Gouldman	Stewart	4:10
7.	"Life Is a Minestrone"	Stewart; Creme	Creme	4:42
8.	"The Film of My Love"	Creme; Godley	Gouldman	5:07
Total length:				22:28

=== Bonus tracks on the 1997 CD edition ===
No.	Title	Writer(s)	Lead vocals	Length
9.	"Channel Swimmer"	Godley; Gouldman	Gouldman	2:50
10.	"Good News"	Godley; Creme	Godley with Creme	3:48
Total length:				48:22

=== Additional bonus tracks on Japanese edition ===
No.	Title	Writer(s)	Lead vocals	Length
11.	"Life Is a Minestrone (Single edit)"	Stewart; Creme	Creme	4:08
12.	"I'm Not in Love (Single edit)"	Stewart; Gouldman	Stewart	3:46
Total length:				56:16

== Personnel ==
Adapted from the liner notes of the album:

10cc

- Eric Stewart – lead (1, 2, 4–6) and backing vocals (1, 3–5, 7, 8), electric (3–8) and steel guitars (1, 3), Fender Rhodes electric piano (2, 4, 6), piano (3, 4, 6), organ (8), percussion (8)
- Lol Creme – lead (1, 3, 7) and backing vocals (all tracks), piano (all but 3), Fender Rhodes electric piano (1, 7), organ (3), Moog synthesizer (5), percussion (1, 4, 7, 8), electric (4, 7) and acoustic guitars (6), Gizmo (3, 5), vibraphone (1), violins (5), autoharp (6), mandolin (8)
- Graham Gouldman – lead (1, 3, 8) and backing vocals (all but 8), bass guitar (all tracks), electric (2–4, 7, 8) and acoustic guitars (6, 7), percussion (1), double bass (5), autoharp (6), mandolin (8)
- Kevin Godley – lead (1, 3, 5) and backing vocals (all tracks), drums (1, 3, 4, 6, 7), bass drum (5), timpani (1, 5), marimba (5), timbales (7), bongos (8), percussion (1, 4, 6–8), Moog synthesizer (2), cellos (5)

Technical

- 10cc – production
- Hipgnosis – cover design
- Humphrey Ocean – cover illustration

== Charts ==
=== Weekly charts ===
Chart (1975)	Peak position
Australian Albums (Kent Music Report)	9
Canada Top Albums/CDs (RPM)	5
New Zealand Albums (RMNZ)	37
UK Albums (Official Charts)	3
US Billboard 200	15

=== Year-end charts ===
Chart (1975)	Position
Canada Top Albums/CDs (RPM)	32
UK Albums (OCC)	17
US Billboard 200	80

== Certifications ==
Region	Certification	Certified units/sales
Australia (ARIA)	Gold	20,000^{^}
United Kingdom (BPI)	Gold	100,000^{^}
^{^} Shipments figures based on certification alone.
