= Life Is a Minestrone =

1975 single by 10cc

Single by 10cc

from the album The Original Soundtrack
- B-side: "Channel Swimmer"
- Released: 28 March 1975
- Studio: Strawberry Studios (Stockport, Greater Manchester, England)
- Genre: Pop
- Length: 4:08 (single version); 4:42 (album version)
- Label: Mercury
- Songwriters: Eric Stewart; Lol Creme
- Producer: 10cc

10cc singles chronology
"Silly Love" (1974)	"Life Is a Minestrone" (1975)	"I'm Not in Love" (1975)

Official Audio
- "Life Is a Minestrone" on YouTube

"Life Is a Minestrone" is a 1975 song by the English rock band 10cc, released as the lead single from their third studio album, The Original Soundtrack.

== Background ==
The track was written after Lol Creme and Eric Stewart were driving home from Strawberry Studios and a BBC Radio presenter said something that they only partly heard, but which Creme interpreted as "life is a minestrone". Stewart and Creme believed the phrase to be a good title for a song on the grounds that life is, according to Stewart in a BBC Radio Wales interview, "a mixture of everything we pile in there". They had the song written in a day.

== Personnel ==
Adapted from the liner notes of The Original Soundtrack.

10cc

- Lol Creme – vocals, piano, percussion, electric guitar
- Kevin Godley – drums, timbales, percussion, backing vocals
- Eric Stewart – electric guitar, backing vocals
- Graham Gouldman – bass, additional guitars, backing vocals

== Release ==
The song was released as the lead single from The Original Soundtrack, as the band had reservations regarding the over-six-minute ballad "I'm Not in Love" being the lead. In the United States, "Life Is a Minestrone" was not issued until after the release of "I'm Not in Love", so the band re-issued the record there in 1976 with "Lazy Ways" from their next studio album, How Dare You!, as its B-side.

The B-side "Channel Swimmer" appears as a bonus track on the later CD release of The Original Soundtrack.

== Reception ==
=== Commercial ===
The song charted at No. 7 on the UK singles chart, No. 12 on the Dutch Top 40, and No. 7 on the Irish Singles Chart in 1975. In 1976, it charted at No. 104 on the Billboard Hot 100.

=== Critical ===
In his review for AllMusic, Dave Thompson called the song "utterly daft, wholly compulsive" and a "deadly accurate barrage of disconnected theories, thoughts and ghastly geographical puns, all tied together by that bizarre nomenclatural observation and a fadeout which is pure Paul McCartney". He noted that "reducing the human condition to the contents of a well-stacked pantry, composers Lol Creme and Eric Stewart combine for a truly joyous slice of pop nonsense, and one of 10cc's most effervescent hit singles".
