= Rubber Bullets =

1973 single by 10cc

Single by 10cc

from the album 10cc
- B-side: "Waterfall"
- Released: June 1973
- Genre: Art rock, glam rock, rock and roll
- Length: 3:40 (Radio Edit); 4:09 (Single Version); 5:15 (Album Version)
- Label: UK Records
- Songwriters: Lol Creme; Kevin Godley; Graham Gouldman
- Producer: 10cc

10cc singles chronology
"Johnny Don't Do It" (1972)	"Rubber Bullets" (1973)	"The Dean and I" (1973)

Official audio
- "Rubber Bullets" on YouTube

Audio sample
- "Rubber Bullets": file; help

"Rubber Bullets" is a song by the English band 10cc from their self-titled debut album. It was written by Lol Creme, Kevin Godley and Graham Gouldman.

== Recording and impact ==
The song features a double-speed guitar solo, guitarist Eric Stewart explained:

That's a double track solo on that. It's, it's very, very high, of course, going through a Marshall stack, then I slowed the tape to half speed – seven and a half [inches per second] – and recorded it, you know, going [plays single picked notes slowly] and when you speed it back up you've got an octave up, but there's a screaming fuzz on the top of it, that's an octave higher than it was recorded. So it's a very unusual sound done in that way, just an experiment. Because 10cc, we love to experiment, we used to love to waste time. And having the beauty of having our own studio, we didn't have a clock in there so we weren't restricted.

Stewart also recalled:

I was amazed, but pleased that the BBC never banned the track, although they limited its airplay, because they thought it was about the ongoing Northern Ireland conflicts. In fact, it was about an Attica State Prison riot like the ones in the old James Cagney films.

Bassist Graham Gouldman remembered:

Kevin and Lol had the chorus and part of the verse but then got stuck. We all loved the chorus and realised it was a hit in itself, so we wanted to persist with it. I chipped in the line 'we've all got balls and brains, but some's got balls and chains.' One of my finer couplets.

Although the song was not banned by the BBC at the time of release, it was later banned for the duration of the Gulf War in 1990 and 1991.

== Chart performance ==
"Rubber Bullets" was the band's first number one single in the UK Singles Chart, spending one week at the top in June 1973. It also reached No. 1 in Ireland for two weeks, No. 3 in Australia, and No.17 in New Zealand, but fared relatively poorly in the United States where it peaked at only No. 73, and in Canada (their first appearance) where it reached just No. 76. The single achieved sales of over 50,000 copies in Australia, being eligible for the award of a Gold Disc.

== In popular culture ==
- "Rubber Bullets" was used as the theme song to the pilot episode of American adult animated TV series Superjail! titled "Bunny Love", which aired in May 2007.
- The song was featured on the soundtrack of the 1998 film A Soldier's Daughter Never Cries.
