= UK Records =

Defunct record label founded by producer Jonathan King

UK Records was a music label from the 1970s.

== History ==
The label was launched in 1972 by Jonathan King to distribute his own releases and those by some other artists. The abbreviation UK stands for "United King". The label was distributed at first by Decca Records and, after 1976, by PolyGram (which later bought out Decca in 1980).

When the label was established, its UK operations were first run by Chris Denning, then by former DJ Don Wardell and by John Peel's Dandelion Records chief, Clive Selwood. Its releases included UK singles chart hits for Terry Dactyl and the Dinosaurs (fronted by Jona Lewie), 10cc, and Shag, a pseudonym used by King himself. The label's only UK no.1 record was 10cc's "Rubber Bullets"; eight of the band's singles were released by the label. The UK label also released successful singles by the First Class, Carl Malcolm, Kevin Johnson, Roy C, Lobo, and by Jonathan King himself, as well as recording Freddie Garrity and the Kursaal Flyers among others. Successful albums included two by 10cc (10cc and Sheet Music), as well as the King-produced Original London Stage Soundtrack of The Rocky Horror Show.

The label was dissolved in the 1970s.

== Discography ==
- Albums

== See also ==
- List of record labels
