= Lol Creme =

English musician (born 1947)

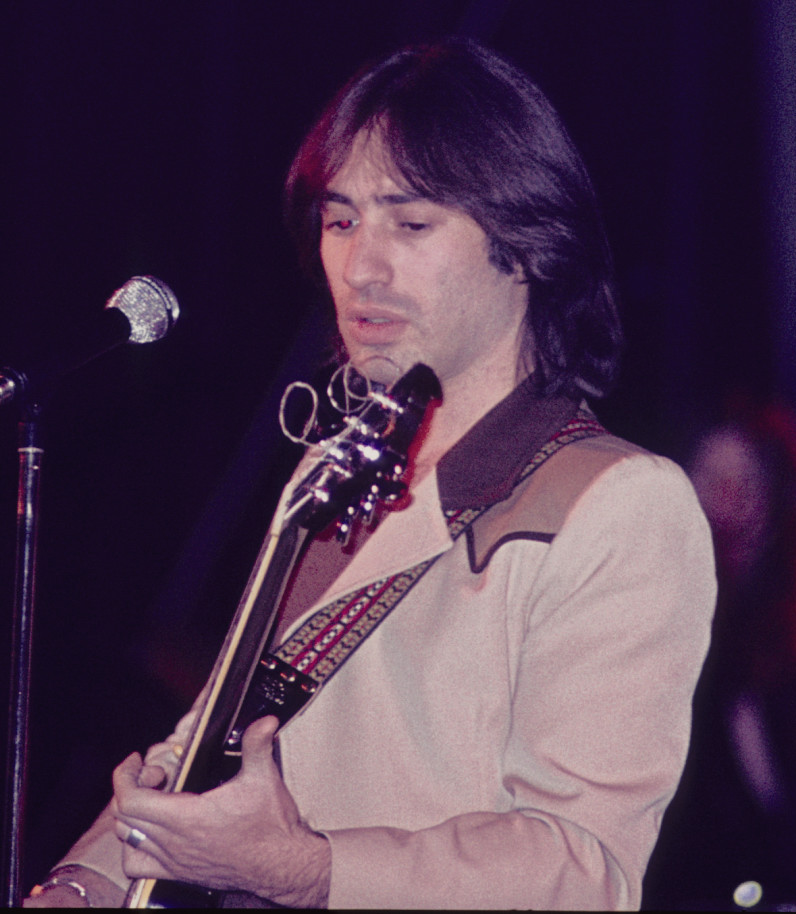
- Creme in 1976 performing with 10cc

Background information
- Also known as: Lolagon
- Born: Laurence Neil Creme; 19 September 1947 (age 78); Prestwich, Lancashire, England
- Genres: Art rock; electronic
- Occupations: Musician; music video director
- Instruments: Guitar; keyboards; vocals; bass
- Years active: 1962–present

Laurence Neil "Lol" Creme (/ˈkriːm/ KREEM; born 19 September 1947) is an English musician and music video director, best known for his work in 10cc. He was later one half of the duo Godley & Creme, with 10cc drummer Kevin Godley. Creme has collaborated with Trevor Horn's Band. He sings and plays guitar, bass and keyboards.

== Early life and education ==
Creme was born in Prestwich, Lancashire, England. Like bandmates Graham Gouldman and Kevin Godley, Creme grew up in a Jewish household. While attending art school in Birmingham, where he met Godley, he took up the nickname 'Lolagon'.

He graduated from Birmingham School of Art in 1968.

== Career ==
=== Early career ===
Creme and Kevin Godley joined the R&B combo the Sabres (the Magic Lanterns), Hotlegs and other bands together.

After recording a one-off single under the name of 'Yellow Bellow Room Boom' for UK CBS in 1967 ("Seeing Things Green" b/w "Still Life"), the pair began their professional music career together in 1969, performing pop music in Strawberry Studios at Stockport near Manchester with Eric Stewart and Graham Gouldman. The duo also released a single in 1969, "I'm Beside Myself" b/w "Animal Song", under the name Frabjoy & Runcible Spoon after being signed on to Marmalade Records directly by label head Giorgio Gomelsky. A 7-song LP was slated for a late 1969 release on Marmalade; however, the label collapsed financially before the end of the year, and the LP was shelved until its release in the 2022 compilation Frabjous Days: The Secret World of Godley & Creme 1967–1969 on Grapefruit Records.

=== 10cc and Godley & Creme ===
Godley and Creme most significantly performed, wrote and produced with 10cc, an art rock group the duo formed with Graham Gouldman and Eric Stewart, who had both been in the band The Mindbenders (formerly fronted by Wayne Fontana).

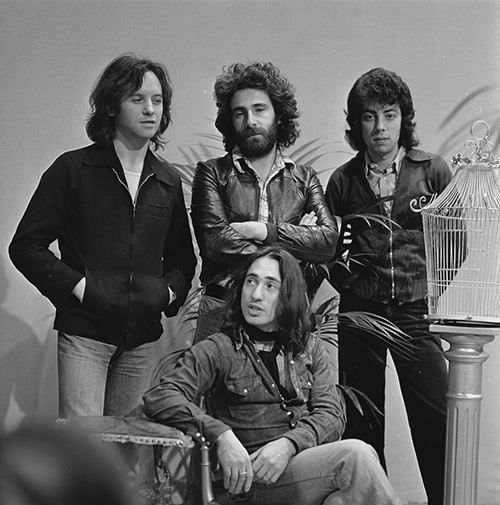
Creme (centre, seated) with 10cc in 1974

From 1972 to 1978, 10cc had five consecutive UK top-ten albums: Sheet Music (1974), The Original Soundtrack (1975), How Dare You! (1976), Deceptive Bends (1977) and Bloody Tourists (1978). 10cc also had twelve singles reach the UK Top 40, three of which were the chart-toppers "Rubber Bullets" (1973), "I'm Not in Love" (1975) and "Dreadlock Holiday" (1978). "I'm Not in Love" was their breakthrough worldwide hit, and is known for its innovative backing track.

Godley & Creme wrote many songs for 10cc, including: "Donna" (no. 2 in UK), "Rubber Bullets" (no. 1 in UK), "The Dean and I" (no. 10 in UK), "Silly Love" (no. 24 in UK), and "Life Is a Minestrone" (no. 7 in UK).

In 1976, Lol Creme and Kevin Godley left 10cc to record as Creme & Godley (later Godley & Creme). In 1977, they released their first album project – Consequences – a concept album demonstration piece for the "Gizmo" a device that enabled an electric guitar to mimic orchestral instruments the pair had begun developing early on in 10cc years. Consequences is basically a story about meek Walter Stapleton divorcing his French playgirl wife, with English comedian and satirist Peter Cook voicing the parts of two solicitors, the irascible Pepperman and the alcoholic Haig, and Haigs' downstairs resident and reclusive musician, Mr Blint, who constantly interrupts them and confuses the proceedings, and singer Sarah Vaughan. The album was released as a 3 LP box set.

Consequences attained a niche following and had one single released from it, "Five O'clock in the Morning". However, despite the creativity, innovation and imagination involved, it was a commercial flop.

The pair later became music video directors, working with bands including Yes. In 1979, they directed their first music video for their single "An Englishman in New York". After this, they became involved in the production of videos for artists such as Ultravox, the Police, Yes, Duran Duran, Frankie Goes to Hollywood, Huey Lewis and the News and Wang Chung, as well as directing the groundbreaking video for their 1985 single "Cry".

In 1988, Godley & Creme parted ways: "What happened was in '89, certainly in '88, maybe before, Kevin changed, I think his priorities in life changed. He'd had enough, he'd simply had enough of me and the way we worked, the things we did, the priorities we had. And the fact that we were a priority, for example. Our working relationship dominated our...lives, you know. It was time for a shift in all that and he was obviously right. When I see him, which is not regularly, but I do see him occasionally, he seems well. I thinks he wants to be lazy and just hang. And God bless him, you know."

=== Later work ===
After cutting ties with Godley, Creme moved to Los Angeles, California, and worked as a director in his own right. Creme directed the 1991 Jamaican comedy film The Lunatic, starring Paul Campbell.

After his move to the United States, Creme began experimenting with digital art and oil painting.

In 1988, Creme became a member of the band Art of Noise, with Anne Dudley and Trevor Horn, and directed videos for the artists who recorded with them, such as Tom Jones. Further work with Horn followed, including forming the band the Producers with Chris Braide and Steve Lipson, and the Trevor Horn Band. Creme appears on Horn's Echoes: Ancient and Modern.

== Family ==
Creme's son, Lalo, was a member of the 1990s indie-dance band Arkarna and has also worked on a number of projects with his father. Creme's wife, Angie, is the sister of ex-10cc member Eric Stewart's wife, Gloria.

== Discography ==
10cc

(See full discography at 10cc discography)

Godley & Creme

(See full discography at Godley & Creme)

Art of Noise

(See full discography at Art of Noise discography)

The Trevor Horn Band

- Made in Basing Street (2012)
