= Kevin Godley =

English musical artist (born 1945)

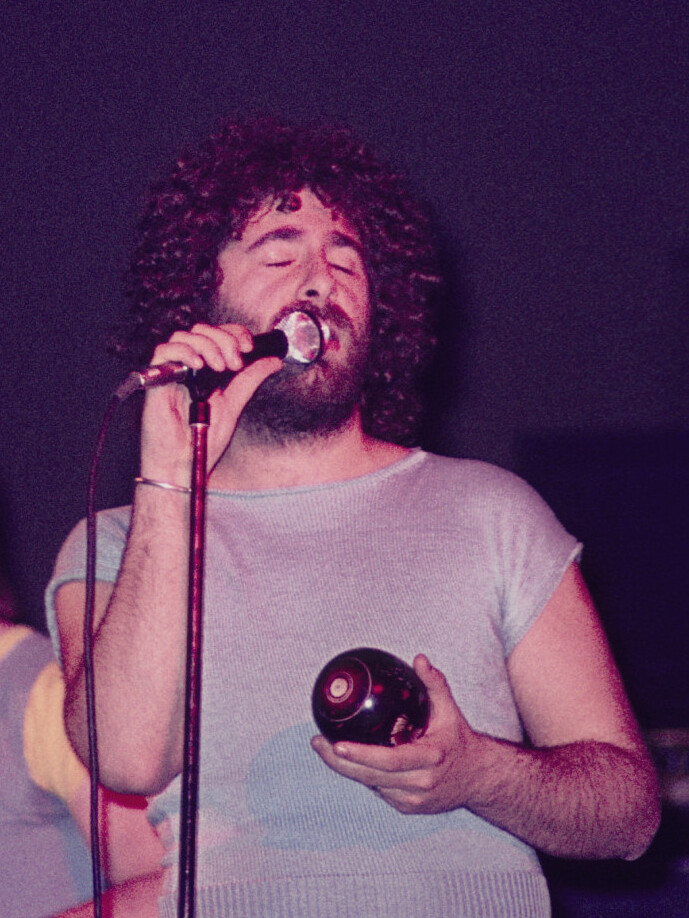
- Godley performing live with 10cc in 1976

Background information
- Born: Kevin Michael Godley; 7 October 1945 (age 81); Prestwich, Lancashire, England
- Genres: Rock; soft rock; progressive rock; new wave
- Occupations: Singer; songwriter; musician; music video director
- Instruments: Vocals; drums; percussion; keyboards
- Years active: 1962–present
- Formerly of: The Mockingbirds; The Sabres; Doctor Father; Hotlegs; 10cc; Godley & Creme; GG/06

Kevin Michael Godley (born 7 October 1945) is an English singer-songwriter, drummer and music video director. He was a singer and drummer of the art rock band 10cc and later was part of collaboration duo Godley & Creme with Lol Creme.

== Early life ==
Kevin Michael Godley was born on 7 October 1945 in Prestwich, Lancashire, England, to a Jewish family, and went to North Cestrian Grammar School in Altrincham.

While attending art college in Manchester Godley met future creative partner Lol Creme. Godley joined the R&B combo the Sabres, later to become the Magic Lanterns. Godley and Creme, like Graham Gouldman, grew up in Jewish households, although Godley downplayed the influence of Judaism on his life and work in later years. "I don’t think of myself as Jewish. I think of myself as Jew-ish. There’s a distinction. It never really occurred to me." In the same interview, he described his religion as "art and music."

== 10cc and Godley & Creme ==
They became involved in a number of bands such as the Mockingbirds, Hotlegs and later 10cc. As part of the bands Godley was a songwriter, lead vocalist, played drums, percussion and keyboards. Godley and Creme recorded four studio albums with 10cc. In 1977, early in the recording of the band's fifth studio album Deceptive Bends, unimpressed with the songs by bandmates Eric Stewart and Graham Gouldman and eager to work on other projects outside of the band, Godley and Creme left.

In 1977, they released their first album project – Consequences – a concept album demonstration piece for the "Gizmo" a device that enabled an electric guitar to mimic orchestral instruments the pair had begun developing early on in the 10cc years. Consequences is a story about meek Walter Stapleton divorcing his French playgirl wife, with English comedian and satirist Peter Cook voicing the parts of two solicitors, the irascible Pepperman and the alcoholic Haig, and Haig's downstairs resident and reclusive musician Mr Blint, who constantly interrupts them and confuses the proceedings, and singer Sarah Vaughan. The album was released as a three-LP box set.

Consequences attained a niche following and had one single released from it, "Five O'clock in the Morning". However, despite the creativity, innovation and imagination involved, it was a commercial flop.

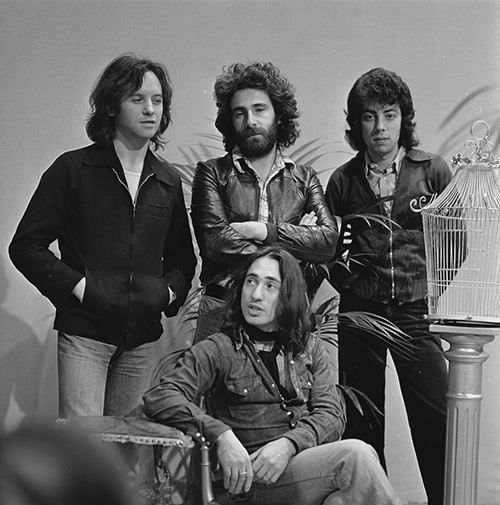
Godley (centre standing) with 10cc in 1974

Both Godley and Creme briefly 'reunited' with their former 10cc bandmates Stewart and Gouldman on the band's tenth studio album ...Meanwhile (1992). Following ...Meanwhile, Godley and Creme went their separate ways again, having experienced difficulties together as early as 1988.

In 2025, Godley reunited with Graham Gouldman for a special performance as 10cc for an edition of BBC Radio 2's Piano Room with the BBC Concert Orchestra conducted by Anne Dudley. Three songs were performed, including "I'm Not in Love", new composition "I Don't Want To Go To Heaven", and a cover version of "All I Have to Do Is Dream".

== Later work ==
In 1996, Godley co-directed (with Geoff Wonfor) the music video for the Beatles' new single, "Real Love".

Godley later again reunited with Gouldman to form the band GG/06. Together they recorded a self-titled extended play (EP), which was made available for free via their website. Since then Godley has several times joined Gouldman's iteration of 10cc in concert, and was featured on the live and video album Clever Clogs (2008).

More recently, Godley moved into developing a music platform for the iPad, one that combines audio and video to create a global recording studio in the cloud called "WholeWorldBand". The company was nominated for the SXSW Music Accelerator Award in 2013, and was one of eight finalists selected from a pool of over 500.

In 2017, Godley publicly invited musicians to send him music to work on his debut solo studio album, titled Muscle Memory with the idea being that he would take the rough ideas and turn them into a finished song. The album was originally supposed to be released in 2018 through campaign on pledgemusic.com, but due to its closure the release was postponed. In 2021, Kevin Godley's album Muscle Memory was completed and released by The state51 Conspiracy after the project stalled as a PledgeMusic campaign.

In 2018, Godley was awarded an honorary Doctorate of Arts by Staffordshire University. In 2021, Godley joined "Group Of Humans", a globally distributed community of interdisciplinary professionals, including designers, strategists, technologists, musicians, and storytellers, as Creative Director. He currently lives and works in Wicklow, Ireland with his wife Sue, and hopes to direct a film based on Orson Welles's time in Ireland.

== Discography ==
Studio albums

- Muscle Memory (2020)

As featured artist

- "The Bad & the Beautiful" – Hog Fever (2016)
- "Confessions" – Hog Fever (2016)
- "Expecting a Message" – Before During After: The Story of 10cc (2017)

With GG/06

- GG/06: EP - 1 (2008)

10cc
(See full discography at 10cc discography)
Godley & Creme
(See full discography at Godley & Creme)
