= Jonathan King discography =

- Studio albums: 10
- Compilation albums: 8
- Singles: 109

This article is the discography of English singer, songwriter and producer Jonathan King.

== Albums ==
=== Studio albums ===
Title	Album details
Or Then Again…	Released: October 1967; Label: Decca, Parrot; Formats: LP
Try Something Different	Released: May 1972; Label: Decca; Formats: LP
Bubble Rock Is Here to Stay (as Bubblerock)	Released: October 1972; Label: UK; Formats: LP
Pandora's Box	Released: July 1973; Label: UK; Formats: LP
A Rose in a Fisted Glove	Released: March 1975; Label: UK; Formats: LP
Sound 9418 (as Sound 9418)	Released: May 1976; Label: UK; Formats: LP
J.K. All the Way	Released: August 1976; Label: UK; Formats: LP
Anticloning	Released: 26 October 1992; Label: Sound of Revolution; Formats: CD
Jonathan King Presents Harry, Ron, Hermione & the Wizards	Released: November 1999; Label: UK; Formats: CD
Earth to King	Released: 26 March 2007; Label: Revvolution; Formats: 2xCD

=== Compilation albums ===
Title	Album details
Greatest Hits – Past, Present and Future	Released: December 1975; Label: UK; Formats: LP, MC
Hit Millionaire	Released: April 1979; Label: Warwick; Formats: LP, MC
The Butterfly That Stamped	Released: July 1989; Label: Castle Communications; Formats: 2xCD, 2xLP
The Many Faces of Jonathan King	Released: June 1993; Label: Music Club; Formats: CD, MC
Jonathan King's 36 Greatest Hits – Loop di Love	Released: 1994; Label: Castle Communications; Formats: 2xCD
Creations & Relations	Released: June 1997; Label: Summit; Formats: CD
Jonathan King / Hedgehoppers Anonymous	Released: July 2001; Label: Wounded Bird; Formats: CD; Split album with Hedgehoppers Anonymous
King of Hits	Released: 21 September 2001; Label: UK; Formats: 8xCD

== Singles ==
=== 1960s ===
Title	Year	Peak chart positions								Label
Title	Year	UK	AUS	CAN	IRE	NL	NZ	SA	US	Label
"Everyone's Gone to the Moon" (Note: All copies of this single, in all territories and on all labels, spell the artist's first name (a stage name) as Johnathan. For all later singles, the spelling was rendered as Jonathan.) b/w "Summer's Coming"	1965	4	44	2	10	—	2	8	17	Decca
"Green Is the Grass" b/w "Creation"	1965	—	—	—	—	—	16	—	—	Decca
"Where the Sun Has Never Shone" b/w "Don't Talk to Me of Protest"	1965	—	—	9	—	—	—	—	97	Decca
"Just Like a Woman" b/w "The Land of the Golden Tree"	1966	56 (Note: Chart position is from the official UK "Breakers List".)	21	—	—	—	—	—	—	Decca
"Icicles (Fell from the Heart of a Bluebird)" b/w "In a Hundred Years from Now"	1966	—	—	—	—	—	—	—	—	Decca
"Seagulls" b/w "Take a Look at Yourself Babe"	1967	—	64	—	—	—	—	—	—	Decca
"Round, Round" b/w "Time and Motion"	1967	—	—	—	—	—	—	—	122	Decca
"1968 (A Message to the Presidential Candidates)" (Note: "1968 (A Message to the Presidential Candidates)" was only released as a single in the US.) b/w "Colloquial Sex (Legend of Today)"	1968	—	—	—	—	—	—	—	—	Parrot
"The Night I Chased the Women With an Eel" (as the Comedy Players) b/w "Where the Sun Has Never Shone"	1969	—	—	—	—	—	—	—	—	Decca
"Love at First Sight (Je T'Aime... Moi Non Plus)" (as the Jonathan King Orchestra) (Note: "Love at First Sight (Je T'Aime... Moi Non Plus)" was only released as a single in the US.) b/w "Another Day"	1969	—	—	—	—	—	—	—	—	Parrot
"Marty" (as the Crew) b/w "Time and Motion"	1969	—	—	—	—	—	—	—	—	Plexium
"Let It All Hang Out" b/w "Colloquial Sex (Legend of Today)"	1969	26	—	—	—	28	—	—	—	Decca
"—" denotes releases that did not chart or were not released in that territory.

=== 1970s ===
Title	Year	Peak chart positions								Label
Title	Year	UK	AUS	BEL (FL)	BEL (WA)	GER	IRE	NL	NOR	Label
"Cecilia" (as the Crew) b/w "1970"	1970	—	—	—	—	—	—	—	—	Decca
"Million Dollar Bash" b/w "City of Angels"	1970	—	—	11	49	—	—	—	—	Decca
"Cherry, Cherry" b/w "Gay Girl"	1970	54	—	7	48	—	—	15	—	Decca
"It's the Same Old Song" (as the Weathermen) b/w "Why Should I Fight!"	1970	19	—	—	—	—	—	—	—	B&C
"Baby You've Been on My Mind" (as Nemo) b/w "In the Summertime"	1971	—	—	—	—	—	—	—	—	Parlophone
"Sugar Sugar" (as Sakkarin) b/w "Main Line Lady"	1971	12	—	—	—	21	20	—	—	RCA Victor
"Lazybones" b/w "I Just Want to Say "Thank You""	1971	23	—	—	—	—	—	—	—	Decca
"Honey Bee (Keep on Stinging Me)" (as the Weathermen) b/w "Anarchy Rock"	1971	—	—	—	—	—	—	—	—	B&C
"Hang On Sloopy" (as Sakkarin) b/w "What You Think Is Just a Joke (Is America Today)"	1971	—	—	—	—	38	—	—	—	RCA Victor
"Fine Together Stomp" (as the Weathermen) b/w "Fred Parsons, Jim Flynn, Waxie Maxie, Lee Gopthal, Old Uncle Clive Crawley and All"	1971	—	—	—	—	—	—	—	—	B&C
"Johnny Reggae" (as the Piglets) b/w "Backing Track"	1971	3	—	—	—	19	10	8	—	Bell
"Hooked on a Feeling" b/w "I Don't Want to Be Gay"	1971	23	—	8	24	—	—	7	—	Decca
"Silver Canon" (as Sakkarin) b/w "Silver Story"	1971	—	—	—	—	—	—	—	—	RCA Victor
"The Sun Has Got His Hat On" (as Nemo) b/w "Bernie's Song"	1971	—	—	—	—	—	—	—	—	Parlophone
"Girl I've Got News for You" (as Robin Jack) b/w "I Love You"	1972	—	—	—	—	—	—	—	—	Bell
"Flirt!" b/w "Hey Jim"	1972	22	—	—	—	—	16	—	—	Decca
"Baby Love" (as the Piglets) b/w "My Fault"	1972	—	—	—	—	—	—	—	—	Bell
"Who's Been Polishing the Sun" (as Nemo) b/w "Vo-Dee-O-Do"	1972	—	—	—	—	—	—	—	—	Parlophone
"It's a Tall Order for a Short Guy" b/w "Learned Tax Counsel"	1972	—	—	—	—	—	—	—	—	UK
"This Is Reggae" (as the Piglets) b/w "Blanket Coverage"	1972	—	—	—	—	—	—	—	—	UK
"Loop di Love" (as Shag) b/w "Lay It Down"	1972	4	53	—	—	—	4	—	6	UK
"The Official Munich Olympic Games Theme 1972?" (as the Athletes Foot) b/w "The Official Munich Olympic Games Theme 1972 Backwards?"	1972	—	—	—	—	—	—	—	—	UK
"You Were on My Mind" (as the Sun Singers) b/w "Sunshine Hootenanny"	1972	—	—	—	—	—	—	—	—	UK
"(We're Gonna) Rock Around the Clock" (as Bubblerock) b/w "Bubblerock Is Here to Stay"	1972	—	—	—	—	—	—	—	—	UK
"Vulture Stomp" (as the Scavengers Otherwise Known as Shag) b/w "Shag"	1973	—	—	—	—	—	—	—	—	UK
"I'll Slap Your Face" (as A Handful of Cheek) b/w "Cheek"	1973	—	—	—	—	—	—	—	—	UK
"Mary, My Love" b/w "A Little Bit Left or Right"	1973	—	—	—	—	—	—	—	—	UK
"The Return of the Red Baron" (as the Baron's Supporters) b/w "Summer Concerto"	1973	—	—	—	—	—	—	—	—	UK
"Bongo Rock" (as Shag) b/w "Clap and Shout"	1973	—	—	—	—	—	—	—	—	UK
"(I Can't Get No) Satisfaction" (as Bubblerock) b/w "Bubblerock Is Here to Stay"	1973	29	59	—	—	—	9	—	—	UK
"A Modest Proposal (Swift's Song)" b/w "The Kung Fu Anthem"	—	—	—	—	—	—	—	—		UK
"Get Off of My Cloud" (as Bubblerock) b/w "People Don't Like Me"	1974	—	—	—	—	—	—	—	—	UK
"People Will Say We're in Love" (as Bubblerock) b/w "People Don't Like Me"	1974	—	—	—	—	—	—	—	—	UK
"Help Me Make It Through the Night" (with Eiri Thrasher) b/w "Colloquial Sex (Lawrence's Song)"	1974	—	—	—	—	—	—	—	—	UK
"Twist and Shout" (as Bubblerock) b/w "I'll Slap Your Face"	1975	—	—	—	—	—	—	—	—	UK
"If You Wanna Be Happy" (as Sloply Bellywell) b/w "Summer Concerto"	1975	—	—	—	—	—	—	—	—	UK
"A Free Man in Paris" b/w "The True Story of Molly Malone"	1975	—	—	—	—	—	—	—	—	UK
"The Way You Look Tonight" b/w "The True Story of Molly Malone"	1975	—	—	—	—	—	—	—	—	UK
"Chick-A-Boom (Don't Ya Jes' Love It)" (as 53rd and 3rd featuring the Sound of Shag) b/w "Kingmaker"	1975	36	—	—	—	—	—	—	—	UK
"Una Paloma Blanca (White Dove)" b/w "Inpraiseofuk"	1975	5	—	—	—	—	15	—	—	UK
"Why Can't We Be Friends" (as 53rd and 3rd featuring the Sound of Shag) b/w "Here's Looking at You, Kid (C'mon Kid)"	1975	—	—	—	—	—	—	—	—	UK
"Baby, the Rain Must Fall" b/w "A Very, Very Melancholy Man"	1975	—	—	—	—	—	—	—	—	UK
"Desiderata" (as David) b/w "David's Theme"	1975	—	—	—	—	—	—	—	—	UK
"In the Mood" (as Sound 9418) b/w "Jimmy's Theme"	1976	46	—	—	—	—	—	—	—	UK
"The Happy People Song" b/w "I've Never Seen a Woman"	1976	—	—	—	—	—	—	—	—	UK
"Little Latin Lupe Lu" b/w "Sex Appeal"	1976	—	—	—	—	—	—	—	—	UK
"Stranger on the Shore" (as Sound 9418) b/w "Everyone's Gone to the Moon"	1976	—	—	—	—	—	—	—	—	UK
"Everybody" (as 53rd and 3rd featuring the Sound of Shag) b/w "I May Be Young"	1976	—	—	—	—	—	—	—	—	UK
"He's So Fine" b/w "The King of the Hooks"	1976	—	—	—	—	—	—	—	—	UK
"The Yam" (as Sound 9418) b/w "I'll Slap Your Face"	1976	—	—	—	—	—	—	—	—	UK
"It Only Takes a Minute" (as One Hundred Ton and a Feather) b/w "Last Tune, This June"	1976	9	—	—	—	—	10	—	—	UK
"The Lonely Bull Meets La Bamba and Lives" (as Sound 9418) b/w "Sex Appeal"	1976	—	—	—	—	—	—	—	—	UK
"Mississippi" b/w "The Littlest Greatest Love"	1976	55	—	—	—	—	—	—	—	UK
"Don't Forget Me When You're on Your Island" (as One Hundred Ton and a Feather) b/w "Let's Not Get Dirty"	1976	—	—	—	—	—	—	—	—	UK
"When I Was a Star" b/w "The Littlest Greatest Love"	1976	—	—	—	—	—	—	—	—	UK
"I'm Gonna Change" (as Sound 9418) b/w "Sex Appeal"	1976	—	—	—	—	—	—	—	—	UK
"When a Child Is Born" (as One Hundred Ton and a Feather) b/w "Love Around"	1976	—	—	—	—	—	—	—	—	
"Just to Be Close to You" (as One Hundred Ton and a Feather) b/w "Love Around"	1977	—	—	—	—	—	—	—	—	Pye
"Sweet Surrender" (as Sean) b/w "Song for Chris"	1977	—	—	—	—	—	—	—	—	Ember
"Can't Get It Out of My Head" (as One Hundred Ton and a Feather) b/w "Double One"	1977	—	—	—	—	—	—	—	—	Pye
"Gonna Fix You Good" (as Joker) b/w "Praise You DJ"	1977	—	—	—	—	—	—	—	—	Paladin
"Rose Marie" (as Peacock) b/w "Peacock's Theme"	1977	—	—	—	—	—	—	—	—	United Artists
"God Save the Sex Pistols" (as Elizabeth) b/w "Silver Story"	1977	—	—	—	—	—	—	—	—	Creole
"Love Catechism" (as J and J) b/w "Speak Your Own Love"	1977	—	—	—	—	—	—	—	—	GTO
"Star Ladies" (as Star Ladies) b/w "Star Ladies" (Instrumental)	1977	—	—	—	—	—	—	—	—	Anchor
"I'm on My Way" (as the House of Lords) b/w "The House of Commons"	1977	—	—	—	—	—	—	—	—	Creole
"Old DJ's (Playing New Sounds)" b/w "I'm the One"	1978	—	—	—	—	—	—	—	—	Epic
"Just One Cornetto" (as Count Giovanni Di Regina) b/w "JK Rules Forever"	1978	—	—	—	—	—	—	—	—	Magnet
"One for You, One for Me" b/w "Cryin' Again"	1978	29	—	—	—	—	—	—	—	GTO
"Lick a Smurp for Christmas (All Fall Down)" (as Father Abraphart and the Smurps) b/w "Sing Your Own Smurp"	1978	58	—	—	—	—	—	—	—	Magnet
"Amazing Grace" (as Sally) b/w "Monotony"	1979	—	—	—	—	—	—	—	—	UK
"You're the Greatest Lover" b/w "The Death of the Last Unicorn"	1979	67	—	—	—	—	—	—	—	UK
"Way Down Yonder in New Orleans" (as Sean Hoff and the Shotguns) b/w "H. H. Blues"	1979	—	—	—	—	—	—	—	—	Pepper
"Do You Want to Know a Secret" (as One Hundred Ton and a Feather) b/w "Carole's Song"	1979	—	—	—	—	—	—	—	—	Pepper
"Gloria" b/w "Mental Diseases"	1979	65	—	—	—	—	—	—	—	Ariola
"—" denotes releases that did not chart or were not released in that territory.

=== 1980s–present ===
Title	Year	Peak chart positions	Label
Title	Year	UK	Label
"It's Illegal, It's Immoral, It's Unhealthy, but It's Fun" b/w "Sing Your Own Immorality"	1980	—	WEA
"I'll Slap Your Face (Entertainment U.S.A. Theme)" b/w "Mental Diseases"	1983	—	Epic
"Space Oddity / Major Tom (Coming Home)" b/w "I'll Slap Your Face (Entertainment U.S.A. Theme)"	1984	77	Epic
"No Speed Limit" b/w "I'll Slap Your Face (Entertainment U.S.A. Theme)"	1985	—	Epic
"It's All in the Game" (as the Man) b/w "Game, Set and Match"	1986	—	RCA
"Gimme Some" b/w "Crying Again"	1986	—	10
"I'll Slap Your Face" (reissue) b/w "No Speed Limit"	1987	99	BBC
"Wild World" b/w "Ways to Be Wicked"	1987	—	UK
"Let It All Hang Out '90" (as JK25) b/w "They Kill Our Raves"	1990	97	MCA
"Music Music Music" b/w "Serious Jake One"	1993	—	Chrysalis
"Doggy (Who Let the Dogs Out)" (as Fatt Jakk and His Pack of Pets)	1999	—	All Around the World
"The Silver Stoat"	2006	—	Revvolution
"Riding a Reindeer"	2007	—	Revvolution
"Rock Star"	2008	—	Revvolution
"Wilde About Boys"	2008	—	Revvolution
"The JK Olympic Games Theme 2008"	2008	—	Revvolution
"Deck of Cards"	2009	—	Revvolution
"Insha Allah"	2012	—	Revvolution
"Figlio Bambino"	2012	—	Revvolution
"We Can't Let Maggie Go" (with the Faithful)	2013	—	Revvolution
"The Lockdown Is Over (The Sun Has Got His Hat On)" (featuring Nemo)	2020	—	Revvolution
"WAYS2021"	2021	—	Revvolution
"—" denotes releases that did not chart.

== As producer (selective) ==
Title	Year	Peak chart positions	Artist
Title	Year	UK	Artist
"Gotta Tell" (Note: Both sides of this Terry Ward record were written and produced by King, using his real name Kenneth King.) b/w "When I Come to You"	1965	—	Terry Ward (With the Bumblies)
"It's Good News Week" b/w "Afraid of Love"	1965	5	Hedgehoppers Anonymous
"Don't Push Me" b/w "Please Don't Hurt Your Heart for Me"	1965	— (Note: "Don't Push Me" did not enter the UK Singles Chart (Record Retailer), but did peak at number 48 on the Melody Maker chart.)	Hedgehoppers Anonymous
"Daytime" b/w "Remember"	1966	57	Hedgehoppers Anonymous
"The Silent Sun" b/w "That's Me"	1968	—	Genesis
"A Winter's Tale" b/w "One Eyed Hound"	1968	—	Genesis
"Where the Sour Turns to Sweet" b/w "In Hiding"	1969	—	Genesis
"Leap Up and Down (Wave Your Knickers in the Air)" b/w "How You Gonna Tell Me"	1971	12	St Cecelia
"Keep On Dancing" b/w "Alright"	1971	9	Bay City Rollers
"Don't Let Him Touch You" b/w "Rainy Day"	1972	35	The Angelettes
"We Can Make Music" b/w "Jenny"	1972	—	Bay City Rollers
"Gimme Some" b/w "Changing My Life Won't Do"	1977	14	Brendon
"Growin' Up" b/w "A Hobo's Life"	1977	—	Alvin Stardust
"Rock Me" b/w "Living on Love"	1977	57	Brendon
"Marmacita" b/w "Remembered Memory"	1977	—	Guys 'n' Dolls
"Edge of a Broken Heart" b/w "Don't Forget Me When You're on Your Island"	1987	95	Briar
"The Brits 1990 Dance Medley" (executive producer) b/w "Satisfaction"	1990	2	Various artists
"—" denotes releases that did not chart.
