= Santa Cecilia =

Santa Cecilia (English: Saint Cecilia) may refer to:

== Places ==
=== Brazil ===
- Santa Cecília, Santa, Catarina, a city
- Santa Cecília (district of São Paulo), a district of the city of São Paulo and a neighbourhood within the district
- Santa Cecília, Paraíba, a municipality
- Santa Cecília do Pavão, Paraná, a municipality
- Santa Cecília do Sul, Rio Grande do Sul, a municipality
- Santa Cecília, Porto Alegre, Rio Grande do Sul, a neighbourhood of the city of Porto Alegre

=== Spain ===
- Santa Cecilia, Province of Burgos, Castile and León, Spain, a municipality
- Santa Cecilia del Alcor, Palencia, Castile and León, Spain, a municipality
- Santa Cecília de Voltregà, Osona, Catalonia, Spain, a municipality

=== Elsewhere ===
- Santa Cecilia District, La Cruz canton, Guanacaste province, Costa Rica
- Santa Cecilia, Sucumbíos, a village in Ecuador
  - Santa Cecilia Airport, an airport in Sucumbíos
- Santa Cecilia Acatitlan, an archeological site and pueblo in the municipality of Tlalnepantla de Baz, State of Mexico, Mexico

== Buildings ==
- Santa Cecilia in Trastevere, a 5th-century church in Rome, Italy
- Santa Cecilia Chapel, a 16th-century Roman Catholic chapel deconsecrated in 1644, Gozo, Malta, near Santa Cecilia Tower
- Santa Cecilia Tower, a 17th-century tower in Gozo, Malta
- Santa Cecília de Elins, a former Benedictine monastery in the municipality of Montferrer i Castellbò, Catalonia, Spain
- Santa Cecília de Montserrat, a Benedictine monastery in Marganell, Catalonia, Spain

== Music ==
- La Santa Cecilia, an American band
- Santa Cecilia Academy, or Accademia Nazionale di Santa Cecilia, a music institution in Rome, Italy
- Orchestra dell'Accademia Nazionale di Santa Cecilia, an Italian orchestra
- Orquesta Clásica Santa Cecilia, a Spanish orchestra founded in 2001
- Conservatorio Santa Cecilia, a conservatory in Rome
- Auditorium Santa Cecilia, part of Parco della Musica, a music complex in Rome, Italy

== Ships ==
- Santa Cecilia-class freighter, a US Navy ship class
  - USS Santa Cecilia, lead ship of the class, originally the freighter SS Santa Cecilia
- Spanish ship Santa Cecilia, originally the frigate HMS Hermione, handed over to the Spanish in 1797 after a mutiny
- USAT John L. Clem, named Santa Cecilia from 1932 to 1936

== Other uses ==
- Santa Cecília (São Paulo Metro), Brazil, a railway station
- Santa Cecilia Airport, Santa Cecilia, Sucumbíos Province, Ecuador
- Deportivo Santa Cecilia, a Nicaraguan football team

== See also ==
- Saint Cecilia (disambiguation)
