= Saint Cecilia (disambiguation) =

Saint Cecilia is the patron saint of musicians and church music in Catholic and Orthodox traditions.

Saint Cecilia, St. Cecilia or Santa Cecilia may also refer to:

== Churches in the United States ==
- St. Cecilia Cathedral, the cathedral of the Catholic Archdiocese of Omaha, Nebraska
- St. Cecilia Catholic Church (Los Angeles), California
- Saint Cecilia's Catholic Church (Brooklyn), New York

== Music ==
- St. Cecilia Mass (Messe solennelle à Sainte-Cécile), an 1855 composition by Charles Gounod
- St. Cecilia: The Elektra Recordings, an album by Blue Öyster Cult, recorded 1970, released 2003
- Saint Cecilia (EP), by Foo Fighters, 2015
  - "Saint Cecilia" (song), the title song
- St. Cecelia, a band that recorded the 1971 song "Leap Up and Down (Wave Your Knickers in the Air)"

== Paintings ==
- Saint Cecilia (Artemisia Gentileschi), a 1620 painting by Artemisia Gentileschi
- Saint Cecilia (Poussin), a 1628 painting by Nicholas Poussin

== Schools ==
- St. Cecilia School (disambiguation), numerous schools

== Places ==
- St. Cecilia (Bahamas Parliament constituency)

== See also ==
- Santa Cecilia (disambiguation)
