= Dead Man Weds =

British television comedy series

- Genre: Comedy
- Written by: Dave Spikey
- Starring: Dave Spikey; Johnny Vegas; Janice Connelly; Alan Rothwell; Iain McKee
- Country of origin: United Kingdom
- Original language: English
- No. of series: 1
- No. of episodes: 6

Production
- Production company: Red Production Company

Original release
- Network: ITV
- Release: January 2005 – February 2005

Dead Man Weds is a six-part comedy series shown on ITV in Britain in January and early February 2005, and repeated on ITV2.

The series was written by Dave Spikey, who played the part of Jerry St Clair in Phoenix Nights. It was produced for ITV by the Red Production Company, and starred Spikey and Johnny Vegas.

The series concerns the staff of a fictional newspaper, The Fogburrow Advertiser, and the title of the series is a typical example of the paper's front-page headlines; Spikey saw the headline on a newspaper billboard about a man who had apparently died but was resuscitated and then later married. The billboard did not have quote marks around the word dead, which made Spikey laugh and so he developed the sitcom from that headline.

The series was filmed in several locations, including Castleton in Derbyshire.

The theme music, also used as incidental music and stings throughout the series, is a version of Jonathan King's composition "It's Good News Week", which was a hit for Hedgehoppers Anonymous in 1965.
