= Johnny Arthey =

British conductor and composer

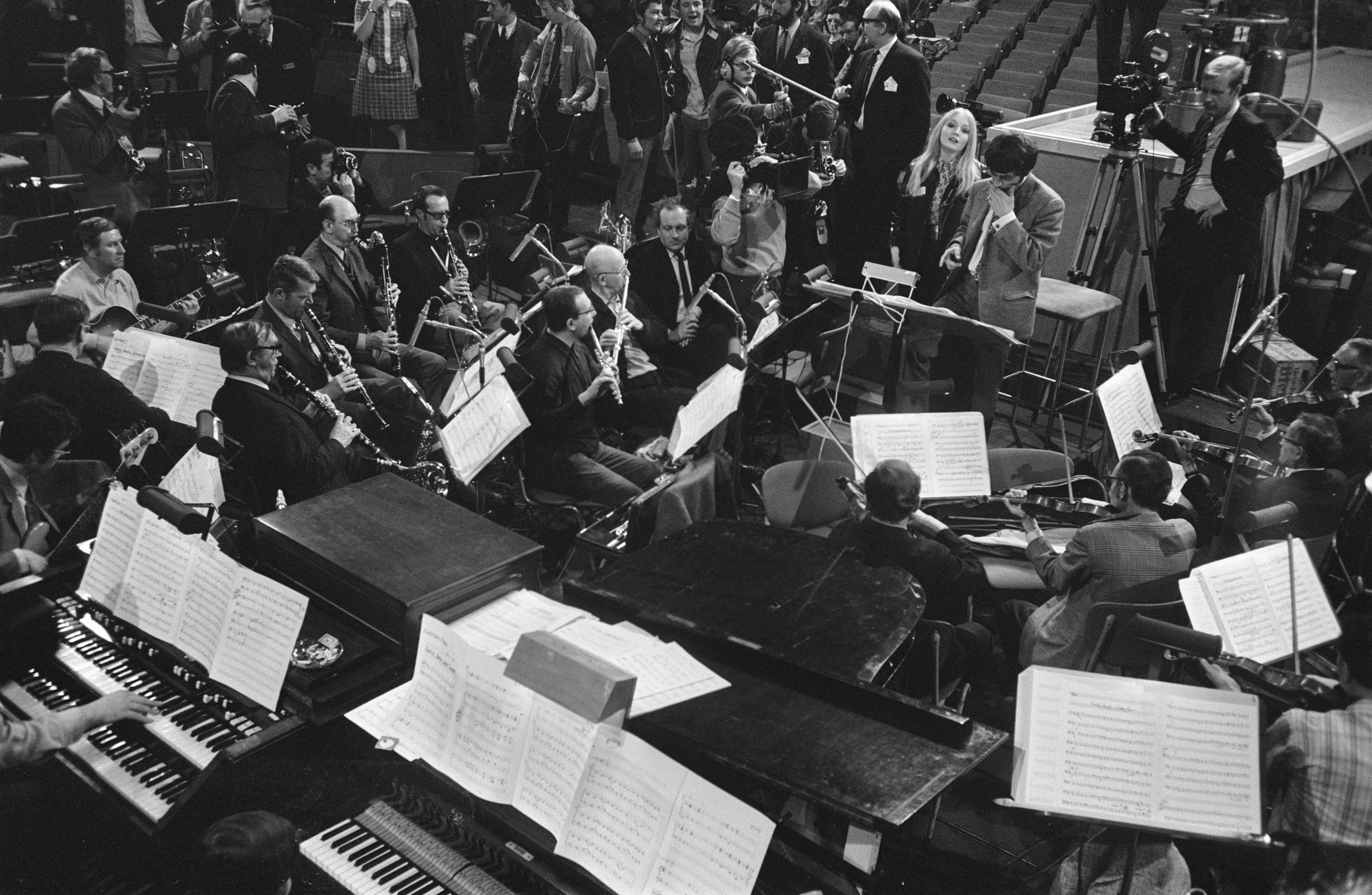
Arthey, Mary Hopkin and the Metropole Orkest (1970)

John Raymond Arthey (24 September 1930 – 27 October 2007) was a British conductor and composer. He was responsible for arranging many hit pop records in the 1960s and 1970s.

== Life and career ==
Johnny Arthey started his career as a pianist with a military orchestra during his National Service. He became a much sought-after arranger in the 1960s and 1970s, working with Engelbert Humperdinck, Petula Clark, Mary Hopkin, Clodagh Rodgers, Vince Hill, Jonathan King, Julie Rogers, Joe Dassin, and Camilo Sesto, among others.

He wrote the orchestration to hit records such as "Eloise" by Barry Ryan, "Young, Gifted and Black" by Bob and Marcia, and "You Can Get It If You Really Want" by Desmond Dekker.

Through his string arrangements, added to Jamaican recordings, he helped reggae artists such as The Pioneers trying to force a breakthrough on the British market. He also arranged the Piglets' hit "Johnny Reggae", and led a recording outfit called The Reggae Strings.

In 1972, he formed the studio group Blue Haze with Phil Swern; their reggae cover version of "Smoke Gets In Your Eyes" reached no. 13 in Canada for 3 weeks, no. 27 on the U.S. Billboard Hot 100, and no. 32 on the UK Singles Chart. Their version of "You'll Never Walk Alone" reached no. 21 on Canada's AC playlist.

With his Johnny Arthey Orchestra, he released a string of instrumental recordings of popular titles. He conducted orchestras for various BBC broadcasts, and conducted three Eurovision Song Contest entries: two for the UK in 1970 and 1971 and one for Luxembourg in 1977.

Arthey died on 27 October 2007 of a stomach tumour.
