= Hourihan =

Hourihan is a surname. Notable people with the surname include:

- James Hourihan (1907–1997), Roman catholic priest
- Marie Hourihan (born 1988), Irish footballer
- Meg Hourihan, American blogger and writer

== See also ==
- Conor Hourihane, Irish footballer
- Hourihan Glacier, a glacier of Antarctica
