= Ross Montgomery (disambiguation) =

Ross Montgomery (born 1962) is a Scottish darts player.

Ross Montgomery may also refer to:

- Ross Montgomery (American football) (born 1946), American football player
- Ross Montgomery (architect) (1888–1969), American architect
