= Entertainment USA =

- Title card from Entertainment USA
- Genre: Light entertainment Documentary
- Presented by: Jonathan King
- Opening theme: I'll Slap Your Face
- Composer: Jonathan King
- Country of origin: United Kingdom
- Original language: English

Production
- Production company: BBC

Original release
- Network: BBC2
- Release: 15 April 1983 – 25 November 1988

Entertainment USA was a British television series broadcast by the BBC. It was first shown on BBC2 in 1983, ran for eight years and was devised and presented by Jonathan King who also composed the introductory music, I'll Slap Your Face

The show presented entertainment news, clips, interviews and music from the United States to a British audience. It was produced by Michael Hurll and directed by Gordon Elsbury. It was nominated for a BAFTA award as Best Light Entertainment Programme in 1987. It had an audience peak of 9.7 million. Each series was repeated later in the year, updated with new music video clips and movie trailers. There were several connected specials at Christmas, and featuring festivals such as the Montreux Jazz Festival in Switzerland.
