= Loop di Love =

Song of Juan Bastós and of Shag

"Loop di Love" is a schlager pop song written by German musicians Dieter Dierks and Michael Schepior, based on the traditional Greek song "Dirlada".

It was first recorded in 1971 by Rolf Steitz (born in Cologne, Germany, 7 January 1952) performing under the pseudonym Juan Bastós. This version was a hit in Germany, Belgium and the Netherlands. Bastós also had a hit in Europe with "Holy Goly Girl", and later worked as a songwriter and as a member of the band Santiago and the duo Bogart.

== Cover versions ==
"Loop di Love" was then recorded by English musician and entrepreneur Jonathan King, who released it in August 1972 on his UK record label under the pseudonym Shag. King's vocals were treated electronically for the record, and it was arranged by Johnny Arthey. The version by Shag reached No. 4 on the UK Singles Chart. The record was also released in the US, Australia, and in Europe.

=== Charts ===
Shag version
Chart (1972/73)	Peak position
Australia (Kent Music Report)	53
United Kingdom (Official Charts Company)	4

In 2001, Austrian artist DJ Ötzi recorded a German language version of the song entitled "Loop Die Love", which can be found on his album Love, Peace & Vollgas.
