= St. Cecilia School =

- St Cecilia's Catholic Primary School, a school established in 1930 in Balgowlah, New South Wales, Australia near Sydney in the Roman Catholic Diocese of Broken Bay
- St Cecilia's Catholic Primary School, a school established in 1916 in Wyong, New South Wales, Australia in the Roman Catholic Diocese of Broken Bay
- St Cecilia School of Music, a private music school in Tasmania, Australia
- St Cecilia's Primary School, a Catholic school established in 1932 in Glen Iris, Victoria, Australia
- St. Cecilia Catholic School, an elementary school in the High Park North neighborhood of Toronto, Ontario, Canada
- St Cecilia Catholic Elementary school is an elementary is school in Maple, Ontario, Canada
- St Cecilia's Roman Catholic High School, a secondary school in Longridge, Lancashire, England
- Saint Cecilia's Church of England School, a secondary school in Wandsworth, London, England
- Accademia Nazionale di Santa Cecilia, or St. Ceclia Academy, a music school in Rome, Italy
- St Cecilia's Convent Secondary School, also known as SM Konven St. Cecilia, a school near Sandakan, Sabah, Malaysia

In the United States

- St. Cecilia School, the parish grade school of St. Cecilia Catholic Church (Los Angeles) in California
- St. Cecilia School, a grade school in San Francisco, California
- St. Cecilia School, a grade school in Tustin, Orange County, California
- St. Cecilia Elementary School, a grade school in Stamford, Connecticut
- St. Cecilia Elementary School, a grade school in Ames, Iowa
- St. Cecilia School, a defunct grade school in Peoria, Illinois in which hostages were taken in 1973
- St. Cecilia Catholic School, a grade school in Haysville, Kansas
- St. Cecilia Elementary School, a grade school in Independence, Kenton County, Kentucky
- St. Cecilia School, a defunct grade school that became Community Catholic School in 1978 and closed in 2004 in Louisville, Jefferson County, Kentucky
- St. Cecilia School (Broussard, Louisiana), a grade school listed on the National Register of Historic Places in Lafayette Parish
- St. Cecilia Catholic School, a grade school in Clare, Clare County, Michigan
- St. Cecilia School, a grade school in Detroit, Wayne County, Michigan
- St. Cecilia School, a grade school in Saint Louis, Missouri
- St. Cecilia High School (Nebraska), part of St. Cecilia Middle and High School in Hastings, Adams County, Nebraska
- St. Cecilia Cathedral School, a grade school in Omaha, Douglas County, Nebraska
- St. Cecilia High School (New Jersey), a defunct high school in Englewood, Bergen County, New Jersey that closed in 1986 and was the first coaching job for Vince Lombardi
- St. Cecilia Interparochial School, a defunct grade school on West Demarest Avenue in Englewood, Bergen County, New Jersey that closed in 2011
- St. Cecilia Elementary School, a grade school in Pennsauken, Camden County, New Jersey
- St. Cecilia Elementary School, a grade school in Rockaway, Morris County, New Jersey
- St. Cecilia's School, a former parochial school of Saint Cecilia's Catholic Church (Brooklyn, New York)
- St. Cecilia Elementary School, a grade school in Cincinnati, Hamilton County, Ohio
- St. Cecilia Elementary School, a grade school in Columbus, Franklin County, Ohio
- St. Cecilia School, a grade school in Beaverton, Oregon
- St. Cecilia Elementary School, a grade school in Philadelphia, Pennsylvania
- St. Cecilia School, a grade school in Pawtucket, Rhode Island
- St. Cecilia Academy, a high school in Nashville, Tennessee
- St. Cecilia Catholic School, a grade school in Dallas, Dallas County, Texas
- St. Cecilia Catholic School (Houston, Texas), a grade school in Hedwig Village, Harris County, Texas in the Roman Catholic Archdiocese of Galveston-Houston
- St. Cecilia School, a grade school in San Antonio, Bexar County, Texas
- St. Cecilia Catholic School, a grade school in Bainbridge Island, Washington
