= St. Andrew's Catholic Church (Pasadena, California) =

St. Andrew Catholic Church
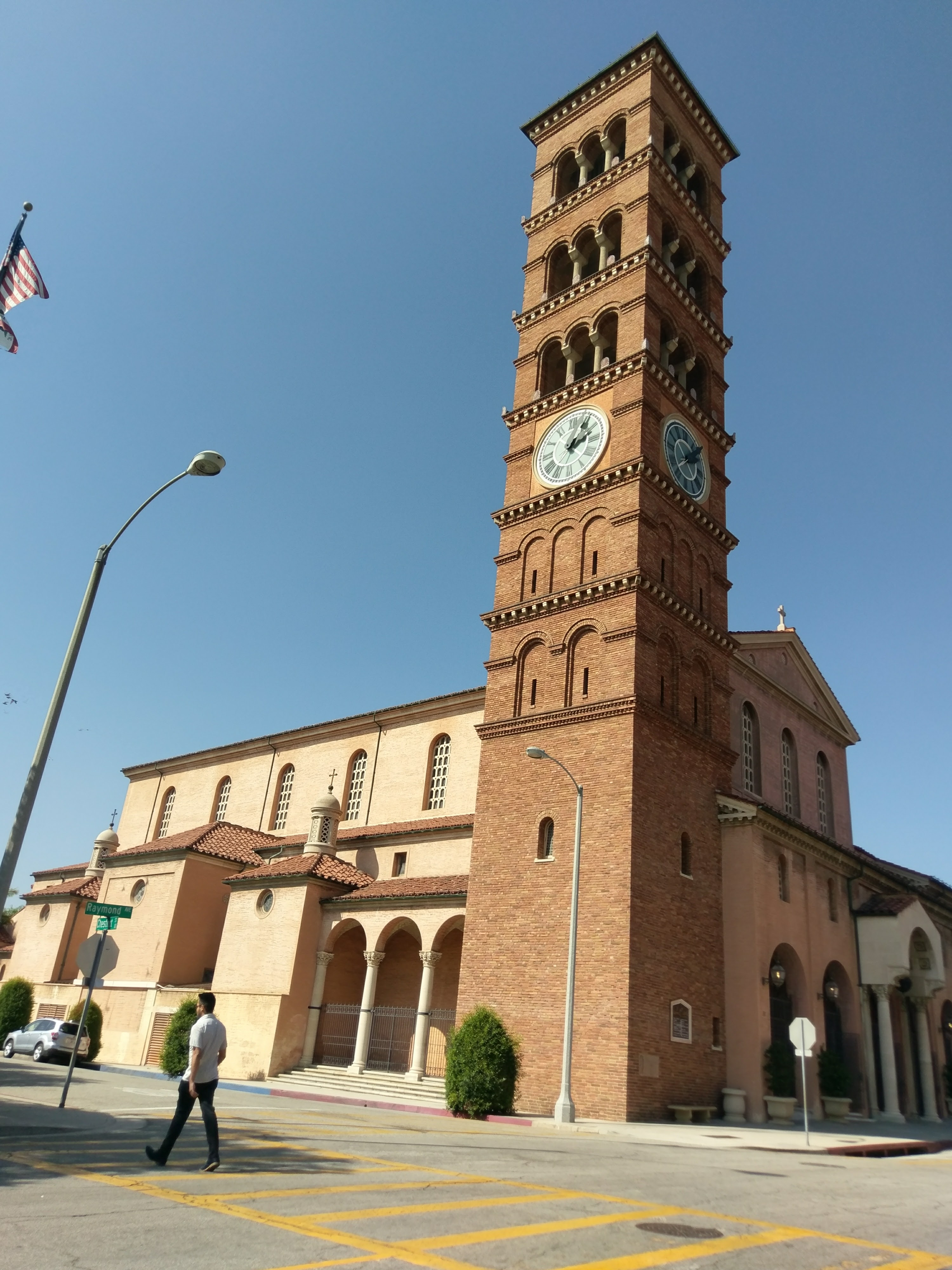
- St. Andrew Catholic Church
- 34.15066°N 118.14933°W
- Location: 311 N. Raymond Avenue; Pasadena, California 91103
- Country: USA
- Denomination: Roman Catholic
- Website: saintandrewpasadena.org

History
- Founded: 1886
- Dedicated: 1927 (current church building)

Architecture
- Architect(s): Ross Montgomery; Robert Brown Young
- Architectural type: Romanesque Revival; Byzantine Revival
- Construction cost: $1,000,000

Administration
- Division: San Gabriel Pastoral Region
- Diocese: Archdiocese of Los Angeles

Clergy
- Archbishop: José Horacio Gómez
- Bishop: Brian Nunes
- Pastor: Marcos Gonzalez

St. Andrew's Catholic Church is a Catholic church in Pasadena, California. Founded in 1886, it is the oldest Catholic parish in Pasadena and one of the oldest in Los Angeles County. Its Romanesque Revival campanile bell tower is visible for miles and is one of the landmarks of Pasadena. The interior of the current church, built in 1927, was modeled after the Basilica of Santa Sabina in Rome, while the façade was modeled after the church of Santa Maria in Cosmedin, down the hill and slightly upriver from Santa Sabina.

== The church building ==
The current home of St. Andrew's Church, built in 1927 at an estimated cost of $1,000,000, is widely regarded as one of the most beautiful and important churches in Southern California. The style of architecture, without and within, is that of early Christian churches of the Byzantine era. The architect, Ross Montgomery, and the church's pastor, John Michael McCarthy, both traveled to Italy studying early Byzantine architecture to find inspiration for the new church in Pasadena. The Los Angeles Times later commented on the contributions of Montgomery and McCarthy: "The collaboration of the architect and the priest has produced an edifice that will remain a monument to the memory of both." Montgomery and McCarthy found their principal inspiration at Santa Sabina, a basilica in Rome built in 432 A.D., on which they modeled St. Andrew's.

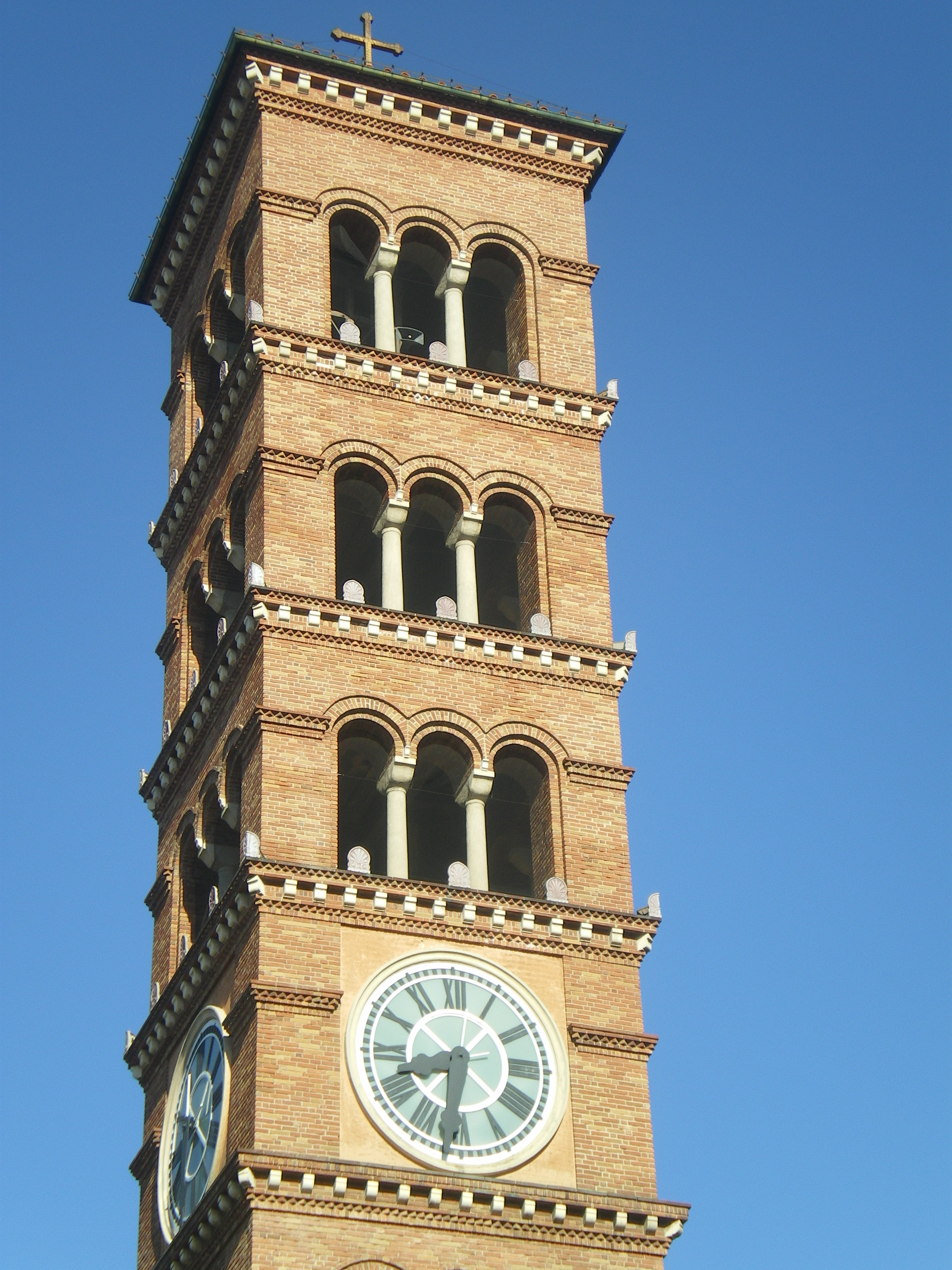
Bell Tower at St. Andrew's

At a dedication Mass in May 1928, hundreds of children participated in a religious procession at 6 a.m. when the Blessed Sacrament, covered by a canopy, was moved from the old church on Fair Oaks to the new church. Bishop John Cantwell declared the new church "the pride of the diocese and a worthy replica of the ancient church on the banks of the Tiber."

In 1930, the Los Angeles Times wrote of the church: "Pasadena, world-renowned for its semi-tropic loveliness, has received a new distinction that, a century hence, may be regarded as greater than all that has gone before. For in the heart of Pasadena, at Raymond avenue and Chestnut street, like a jeweled crown on the head of a Byzantine queen, rises beautiful St. Andrew's Catholic Church. 'Beautiful St. Andrew's!' That appellation will remain long after the last of the present generation has passed. The building and decorations mark a new epoch in religious architecture on the Pacific Coast."

The Architectural Guidebook to Los Angeles says of St. Andrew's: "Early Christian fabric with Romanesque campanile right out of old Ravenna. The rich interior is marvelous, as is the contribution of the church outlines to the cityscape. Best seen from the Foothill Freeway going east at sunset..."

== Carlo Wostry murals ==
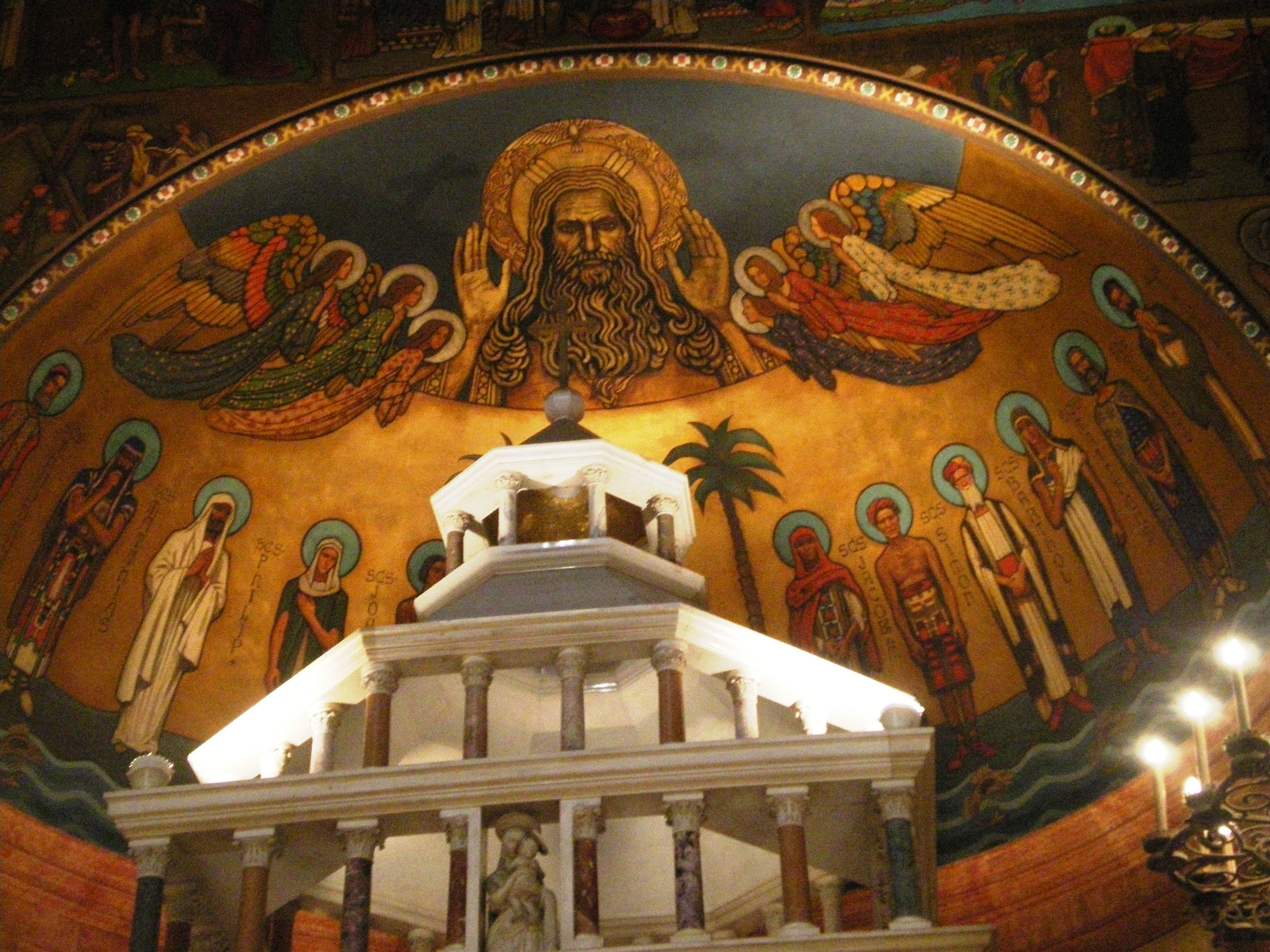
Mural above altar at St. Andrew's

Though the church structure was erected in 1927, it took eight years to complete the murals, stations of the cross, and other internal decorations. The church commissioned the Italian painter, Carlo Wostry, for the murals and stations of the cross. Wostry had previously painted murals in Trieste, Venice, Paris, and New York, but regarded his works at St. Andrew's to be the "crowning work" of his artistic life. He dedicated five years of his life to the interior decoration of St. Andrew's, spending time working both at the church and at a secluded studio in the Hollywood Hills. Initially commissioned for the murals above the altar, the parishioners were so enchanted with Wostry's work that they raised funds to have him paint the chapel in the north nave, on which Wostry spent a year on his portrayal of the Madonna seated on a throne with winged angels above her. In 1932, Wostry received a further commission to paint the stations of the cross, and returned to Trieste to complete the commission. On seeing Wostry's murals in Pasadena, the Los Angeles Times in 1930 declared him "a worthy descendant of the great Italian mural painters of the Renaissance." Twenty-four of Wostry's murals were exhibited in Trieste before being shipped to Pasadena. An article in an Italian newspaper expressed disappointment that the works were leaving Italy for installation in a place "where the people have money but no genuine art appreciation." When the totality of his work was completed in 1935, the Los Angeles Times wrote that Wostry's murals at St. Andrew's were "a revelation to the western art world" and the best "in any church in the two Americas."

== Parish history ==
=== Early years (1886–1918) ===
In 1886, Patrick Harnett from the Cathedral of Saint Vibiana in Downtown Los Angeles was assigned to create a new parish for the Catholic community residing in the Pasadena area. Prior to the creation of a parish in Pasadena, local Catholics had to travel to the San Gabriel Mission or to Downtown Los Angeles for Mass. The first Mass in Pasadena was celebrated at a hotel on Fair Oaks and Colorado Streets. The city's first church was built at the corner of Pasadena Avenue and Bellefontaine. In 1888, the first resident pastor, Andrew Cullen, named the parish for St. Andrew.

In April 1906, the week following the 1906 San Francisco earthquake, a solemn requiem Mass was held at St. Andrew's for the dead in San Francisco. The high altar was draped with black and the mourning insignia displayed, and music was solemn with a full choir assisting in the chants. The Los Angeles Times reported "there were fully one thousand persons present," including many civic leaders, representatives from other churches and "many prominent citizens."

=== John Michael McCarthy (1918–1944) ===
John Michael McCarthy, a native of Brooklyn, New York, was the parish's fifth pastor, serving in that role for 26 years from 1918 to 1944. He was one of the first California priests to be named monsignor, and was known as the "adobe priest" for his love of the Mexican people. He was also known as the "padre of the boulevard" because of his daily custom of walking the streets of Pasadena, offering spiritual counsel and material gifts to those in need. His successor, Bishop McGucken, said, "The public street became his sanctuary, and the good Padre was no vague humanitarian during his daily missions of mercy ... He was the last link with the heritage of Old California." During McCarthy's pastorship, the parish opened a high school and in 1927 built the present church at Raymond and Chestnut Streets. McCarthy remained at St. Andrew's as pastor emeritus from 1944 until his death in 1951. McCarthy's funeral was attended by some 800 parishioners and church officials.

=== The McGucken and Hourihan years (1944–1982) ===
Bishop Joseph T. McGucken, a native of Los Angeles who attended Polytechnic High School, was McCarthy's successor as pastor at St. Andrew's, serving from 1944 to 1955. In addition to serving as pastor at St. Andrew's, Bishop McGucken was the Vicar General of the Los Angeles Archdiocese. In 1955, he left St. Andrew's when he was appointed the Bishop of Sacramento. The parish gave Bishop McGucken a gala farewell celebration at the Pasadena Civic Auditorium, with a performance by Dennis Day, several choirs, and an Army color guard. Bishop McGucken served as Bishop of Sacramento from 1955–1962, and later as Archbishop of San Francisco from 1962-1977.

St. Andrew's had another long-serving priest in James Hourihan, a native of Ireland, educated at All Hallows College, Dublin, who served at St. Andrew's first as assistant pastor from 1931-1936 and then as pastor for 27 years from 1955 to 1982. In 1986, Hourihan published a 224-page history of St. Andrew's parish.

=== Recent years ===
Tobias P. English, an Air Force veteran during the Korean War, was pastor at St. Andrew's from 1982 to 1999. After his retirement, English remained at St. Andrew's as pastor emeritus.

Following Hurricane Katrina, the parish of St. Andrew's paid rent on an apartment for a young mother and her infant daughter for six months. In addition to a crib and Christmas gifts, the parish council provided emotional support.

In July 2004, associate pastor, Marcos Gonzalez, was the subject of a 2,300-word feature in the Los Angeles Times concerning the "new breed" of "devoutly conservative" priests ordained under Pope John Paul II. Gonzalez, born in Fidel Castro's Cuba, identified two pivotal figures in his teenage years: "John Paul in my church life and Ronald Reagan in my civil life." Gonzalez drew attention for a passionate homily against abortion and artificial birth control and for his outspoken views on pre-marital sex. One long-time parishioner said she was "startled and gratified" at Gonzalez's homilies: "The older priests seem to slip aside and not mention these things in their homilies, but Gonzalez is not afraid to speak out." In the article, St. Andrew's pastor, Frank Colborn, noted that many younger priests like Gonzalez do not seem to share his passion for ecumenism and social justice causes such as worker rights, though even Colborn said he had come to share the concern over the lack of adherence to church teachings. He said, "The negative side of toleration and inclusiveness is that things become so fuzzy that you don't stand for anything anymore. We're not in the business of throwing people out of the church, but we need to find some way to get people to take seriously that the church does stand for something."

== The school ==
In 1897, the parish opened a Catholic school called the "Academy of Holy Names" (later renamed St. Andrew Catholic School) in a house on North Fair Oaks Avenue. The Sisters of the Holy Names of Jesus and Mary ran the school, and in 1898 they purchased land to build a permanent brick school at Fair Oaks and Walnut Street. The school moved to its current location in 1923, and the existing school building was built in 1949. While he was still serving as a cardinal, Pope Pius XII visited St. Andrew's Church and School. Sister Mary Petra recalled, "He blessed us and admired our church." The high school portion of the school closed in 1980. In September 1997, hundreds of alumni of the St. Andrew School gathered for a reunion to celebrate the school's 100th anniversary.

== Pastors ==
The priests who have served as pastor at St. Andrew's are:

- Andrew Cullen, 1888–1890
- Cornelius Scannel, 1890–1896
- Patrick Farrelly, 1897–1909
- William Quinlan, 1909–1918
- John M. McCarthy, 1918–1944
- Joseph Thomas McGucken, 1944–1955
- James Hourihan, 1955-1982 (assistant pastor at St. Andrew's, 1931–1937, and pastor emeritus, 1982–1997)
- Tobias P. English, 1982 to 1999
- Frank Colborn, 1999 to 2007
- Paul Sustayta (2007 to 2019)
- Marcos Gonzalez (2019–Present)

== Mass schedule ==
As of 2025, the Mass schedule at St. Andrew Church, Pasadena, was:

- Weekdays (English): 8:15 a.m. (Monday - Friday)
- Weekdays (Spanish): 6:30 p.m. (Monday - Friday)
- Saturdays: 8:15 a.m. and 5:00 p.m. (vigil)
- Sundays: 6:30 a.m. (Spanish), 8:00 a.m. (English), 9:30 a.m. (English), 11:00 a.m. (Spanish), 12:30 p.m. (English), 2:00 p.m. (Spanish) and 5:00 p.m. (English)
- Tuesday Holy Hour (Adoration and Benediction of the Blessed Sacrament and Confessions) 7:00 p.m - 8:00 p.m
- Friday Confessions 9:00 a.m. and 7:00 p.m.
- Saturday Confession 4:00 p.m. and 7:00 p.m.

== See also ==
- San Gabriel Pastoral Region
