= Ross Montgomery (architect) =

American architect (1888–1969)

Ross G. Montgomery (September 26, 1888, at Toledo, Ohio – February 14, 1969, at Los Angeles, California) was a Los Angeles-based architect, illustrator, and historian.

== Biography ==
One of Montgomery's historical architecture drawings, "Conjectural Restoration of Church 3, Seen from Southeast".

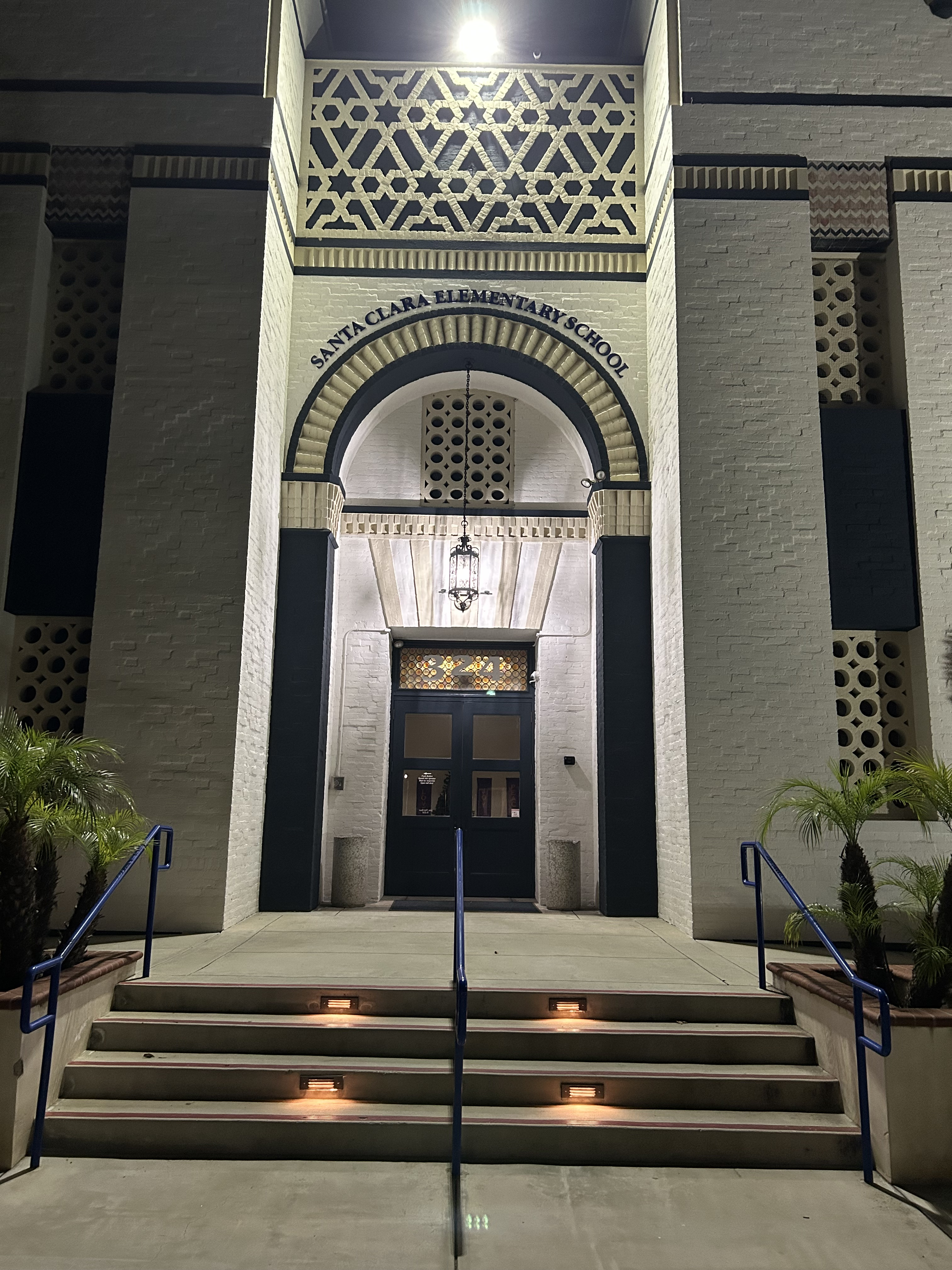
Santa Clara Elementary School Facade, Oxnard, CA (Moorish Revival Style, 1927)

Montgomery designed the original St. Ambrose Church in West Hollywood, California, the St. Andrew's Catholic Church in Pasadena, California, and the St. Cecilia Catholic Church in Los Angeles, California. Additionally, he helped redesign the Mission Santa Barbara after the 1925 Santa Barbara earthquake. He also designed the stucco mausoleum of the Calvary Cemetery in East Los Angeles. Together with William Mullay, he designed Our Lady of Mount Carmel Catholic Church in Montecito, California in the late 1930s. In 1927, Montgomery designed Santa Clara Elementary School, Oxnard, CA in a Moorish Revival style with outstanding articulated brickwork facade and watch towers.

As an architectural historian, he wrote about the Awatovi Ruins.

The original publication by Ross Montgomery related to the Awatovi Expedition of the late 1930s was included in Volume 36 of Harvard University Peabody Museum of Archaeology & Ethnology Papers.
