= Everyone's Gone to the Moon =

1965 debut single by Jonathan King

Single by Jonathan King

from the album Or Then Again...
- B-side: "Summer's Coming"
- Released: 1965
- Recorded: 1965
- Genre: Psychedelic pop
- Length: 2:23
- Label: Decca (UK); Parrot (US and Canada)
- Songwriter: Jonathan King
- Producer: Jonathan King

Jonathan King singles chronology
"Everyone's Gone to the Moon" (1965)	"Green Is the Grass" (1965)

"Everyone's Gone to the Moon" is the debut single by the English singer-songwriter and record producer Jonathan King. It was released in 1965 while King was still an undergraduate at Cambridge University. Early copies of this single, in all territories and on all labels, spell the artist's first name (a stage name) as Johnathan. For all later singles, the spelling was rendered as Jonathan, and most compilation appearances of this track use the more conventional Jonathan spelling as well.

== Chart performance ==
Released by Decca Records, it reached No. 4 in the UK, and No. 17 in the US Billboard Hot 100. It reached #2 on the New Zealand Lever Hit Parade charts.

== See also ==
- List of 1960s one-hit wonders in the United States
