= James Hourihan =

Irish-born Roman Catholic priest

Monsignor James Hourihan
- Born: January 4, 1907; Dunmanway, County Cork, Ireland
- Died: July 8, 1997 (aged 90); Los Angeles, California
- Education: St Finbarr's College, Farranferris in Cork
- Years active: 1931–1982

Ecclesiastical career
- Religion: Christianity
- Church: Roman Catholic Church
- Ordained: 1931
- Congregations served: St. Andrew's Catholic Church, Pasadena

Msgr James Hourihan (January 4, 1907 – July 8, 1997) was an Irish born Roman Catholic priest who long serving pastor to St. Andrew's Catholic Church (Pasadena, California).

== Early life, education, ordination ==
James Hourihan was born in Dunmanway, County Cork, Ireland in 1907, to Timothy and Julia (O'Neil) Hourihan. He has two brothers, John Emmanuel and Brendan Hourihan, both Carmelite priests. He was educated at St Finbarr's College in Cork and trained for the priesthood at the missionary college of All Hallows College, Dublin.

== Assignments ==
Following ordination in 1931 in All Hallows, he went to America where at St. Andrew's he served as assistant pastor from 1931–1936 and then as pastor for 27 years from 1955 to 1982. Following retirement he still served the Pasadena church, and in 1986, Msgr. Hourihan published a 224-page history of St. Andrew's parish.

== Honour and award ==
In 1962 Fr Hourihan was honoured with the church title of Monsignor by Pope John XXXIII, in recognition of his contribution to the church.

== Death ==
Msgr Hourihan died on 8 July 1997.

== Publications ==
- The History of St. Andrew's Parish, 1886–1986 by James Hourihan, Custombook Inc., New York, 1986.
