= Santa Cecilia Airport =

Airport serving Santa Cecilia, Ecuador

- IATA: WSE; ICAO: SECE

Summary
- Airport type: Public
- Serves: Santa Cecilia, Ecuador
- Elevation AMSL: 1,062 ft / 324 m
- Coordinates: 0°04′15″N 76°59′30″W

Map
- Location of the airport in Ecuador

Runways
Direction	Length		Surface
Direction	m	ft	Surface
06/24	730	2,395	Asphalt/gravel
- Sources: GCM Google Maps

Santa Cecilia Airport (IATA: WSE, ICAO: SECE) is an airport serving the village of Santa Cecilia in Sucumbíos Province, Ecuador.

Santa Cecilia is 29 km (15.4 nautical miles) west of the Nueva Loja-Lago Agrio VOR-DME (ident: LAV).

== See also ==
- List of airports in Ecuador
- Transport in Ecuador
