= Santa Cecília, Paraíba =

Coordinates: 7°44′20″S 35°52′44″W

- Municipality
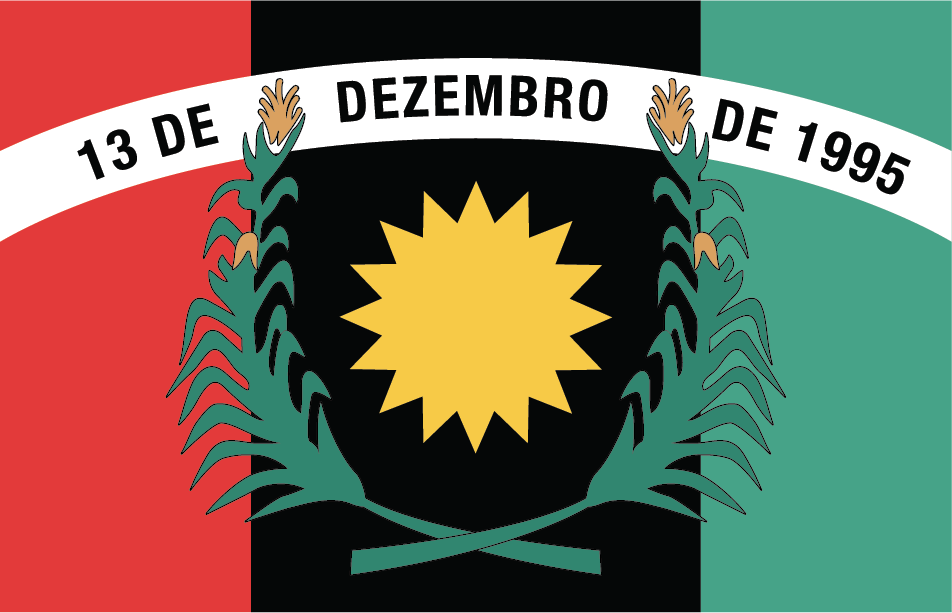
- Flag Coat of arms
- Interactive map of Santa Cecília, Paraíba
- Country: Brazil
- Region: South
- State: Paraíba
- Mesoregion: Agreste Paraibano

Population (2020)
  - Total: 6,541
- Time zone: UTC−3 (BRT)

Santa Cecília (Central northeastern portuguese pronunciation: [ˈsɐ̃tɐ siˈsijɐ]) is a municipality in the state of Paraíba in the Northeast Region of Brazil.

== See also ==
- List of municipalities in Paraíba
