= Santa Cecilia del Alcor =

Coordinates: 41°56′N 4°39′W

- municipality
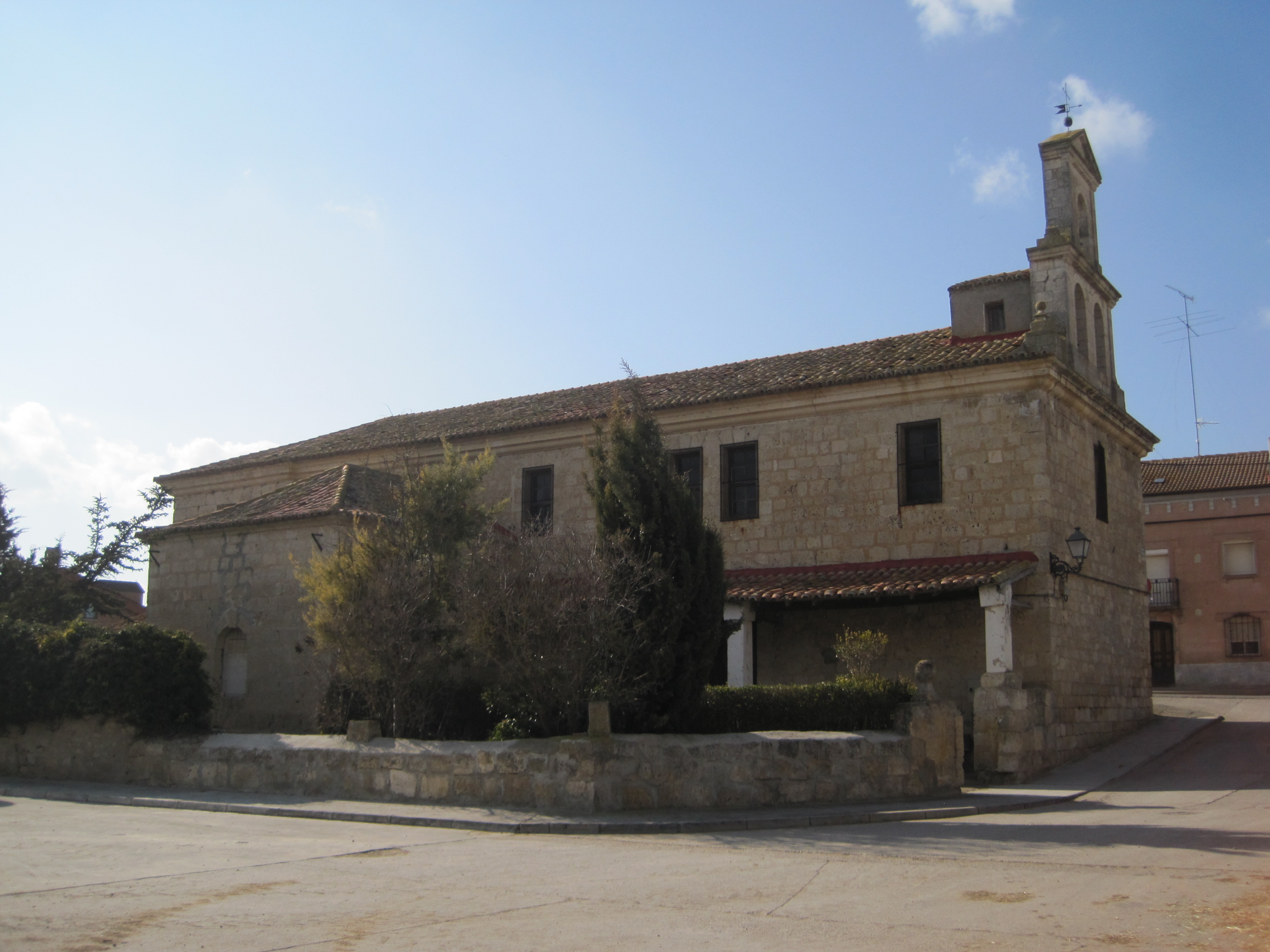
- Interactive map of Santa Cecilia del Alcor
- Country: Spain
- Autonomous community: Castile and León
- Province: Palencia
- Municipality: Santa Cecilia del Alcor

Area
  - Total: 20 km^{2} (7.7 sq mi)

Population (2025-01-01)
  - Total: 91
  - Density: 4.6/km^{2} (12/sq mi)
- Time zone: UTC+1 (CET)
  - Summer (DST): UTC+2 (CEST)
- Website: Official website

Santa Cecilia del Alcor is a municipality located in the province of Palencia, Castile and León, Spain. According to the 2004 census (INE), the municipality has a population of 152 Santa Cecilia del Alcorians.
