= It's Good News Week =

Single by Hedgehoppers Anonymous
- B-side: "Afraid of Love"
- Released: 1965
- Genre: Pop rock
- Length: 2:05
- Label: Decca (UK); Parrot (US)
- Songwriter: Jonathan King
- Producer: Jonathan King

Hedgehoppers Anonymous singles chronology
"Don't Push Me" (1965)	"It's Good News Week" (1965)	"Stop Press" (1966)

"It's Good News Week" is a song and single by the British band Hedgehoppers Anonymous. Written and produced by Jonathan King, it was first released in 1965.

== Background and chart success ==
The song is a protest song that comments on the media's obsession with bad news. It reached #5 in the UK Singles Chart and stayed on the chart for 12 weeks. The group released four other tracks before breaking up. Lack of further chart activity leaves them labelled as one-hit wonders. It was issued in the U.S. on Parrot, reaching #48 on the Billboard Hot 100.

This song was used as the theme music for Good News Week, a satirical news-based comedy quiz show on Australian television which ran from 1996 to 2000 and was revived in 2008. It was also used in the UK comedy series Dead Man Weds in 2005.

Two versions of the song were recorded. The original recording had the line "lots of blood in Asia now, they butchered off the sacred cow, they've got a lot to eat." At the insistence of the record company, that line was changed to "families shake the need for gold by stimulating birth control, we're wanting less to eat." The birth control version was released in the UK. The sacred cow version was released in the USA.

Finnish band Four Cats made a Finnish language cover version Suurten uutisten päivä (A Day of Great News) in 1965.
