= St. Cecilia Catholic Church (Los Angeles) =

Church in Los Angeles, California, US

Coordinates: 34°00′20″N 118°17′59″W

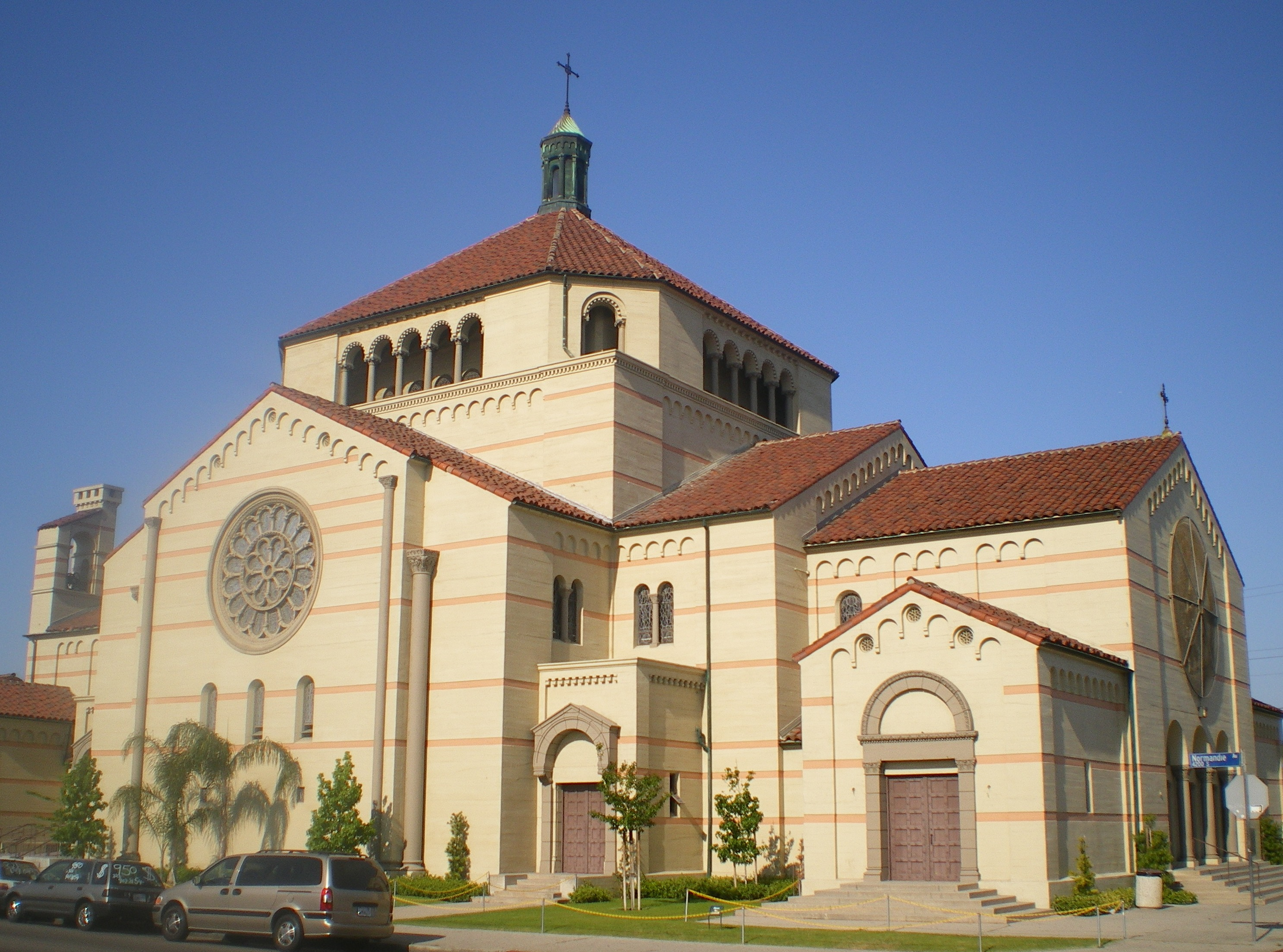
- St. Cecilia Catholic Church
- Location: 4230 South Normandie Ave., Los Angeles, California
- Country: US
- Denomination: Roman Catholic
- Website: www.stcecilia-la.org

History
- Founded: 1909
- Dedicated: Church building dedicated November 20, 1927
- Consecrated: May 1943

Architecture
- Architect: Ross Montgomery
- Style: Lombard Romanesque

Administration
- Diocese: Archdiocese of Los Angeles

St. Cecilia's Catholic Church is a Roman Catholic parish in the Our Lady of the Angels Pastoral Region of the Archdiocese of Los Angeles. The church is located at 4230 South Normandie Avenue in the South Los Angeles section of Los Angeles, California, US. The Lombard Romanesque church was built in 1927.

== Early history ==
St. Cecilia's was established as a new parish serving southern Los Angeles in 1909. The original parish church, located on Normandie Avenue between 42nd and 43rd Streets, was dedicated in August 1910. The first pastor of St. Cecilia's was the Rev. Paul Dillon.

In December 1919, Reverend Edward H. Brady took over as the pastor at St. Cecilia's. During the 1920s, Father Brady led the effort to construct a new church to house the parish. Plans for the new church were approved in March 1926, and the cost was estimated at approximately $225,000.

The new church was dedicated in November 1927 with Bishop John Joseph Cantwell celebrating the dedication Mass.

In May 1943, St. Cecilia's was consecrated by Bishop Joseph T. McGucken, making it only the third church in Los Angeles to be consecrated. (The Cathedral of Saint Vibiana and St. Vincent being the first two.) Relics from the tomb of Saint Cecilia in Rome were sealed in a niche of the altar during the ceremony.

In January 1953, Father Brady died of a heart attack at the St. Cecilia's rectory. At the time of his death, he had served as the pastor at St. Cecilia's for 34 years. In March 1953, Monsignor Patrick J. Dignan became the third pastor of St. Cecilia's.

In January 1954, St. Cecilia's dedicated a new convent at the parish.

== Architecture ==
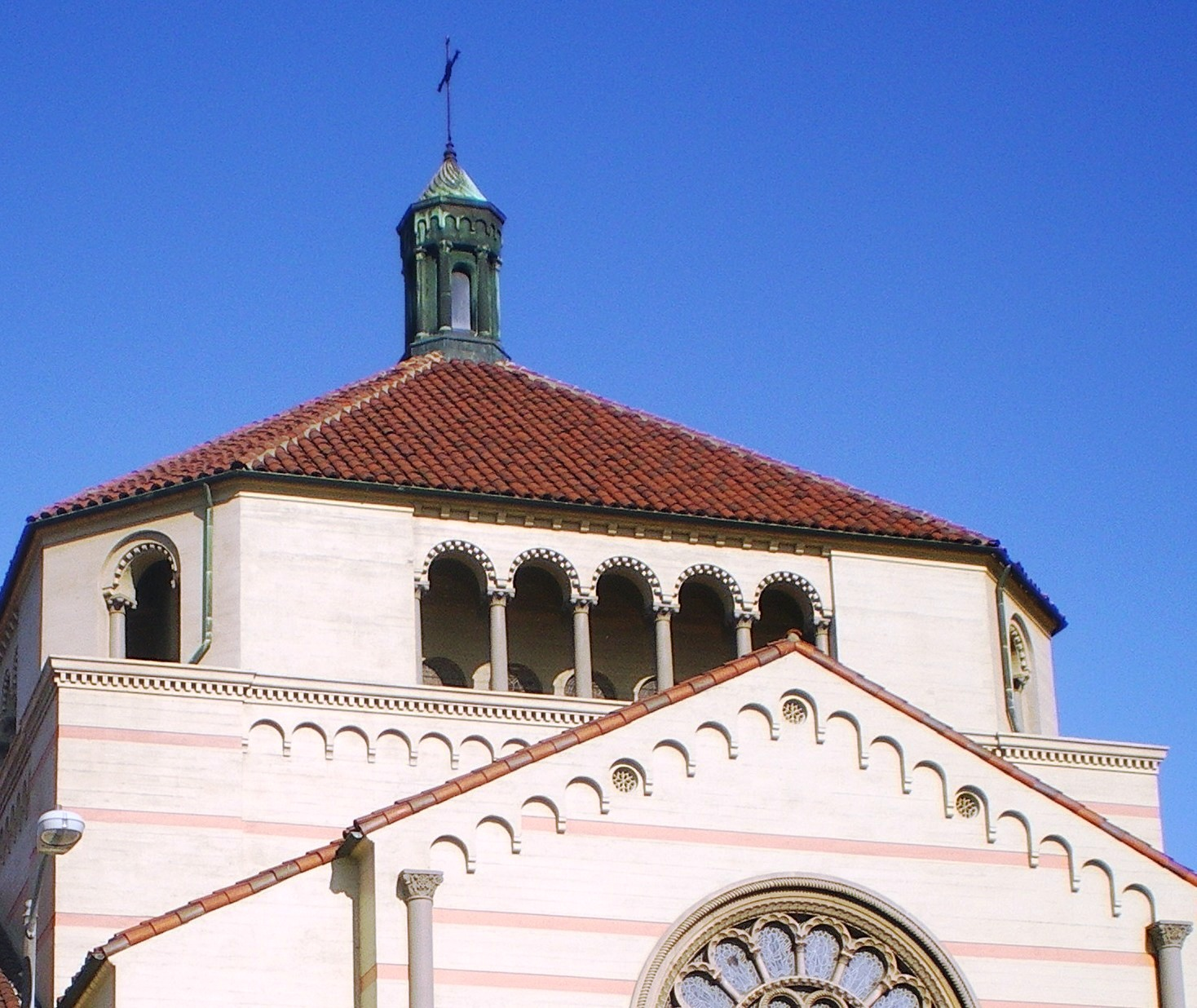
Tower at St. Cecilia

The current Lombard Romanesque church building was built in 1927. It was designed by architect Ross Montgomery. The church is constructed of reinforced concrete with a high altar made of carved French Caen stone. In July 1927, as the structure was being built, the Los Angeles Times reported:

The structure represents a new departure in church architecture, as the style employed by the architect has not been utilized to any extent in Los Angeles or local communities. The design is Lombard Romanesque, a style developed in Italy during the 11th century.

The church was built with a seating capacity of 1,000.

== Recent history and congregation ==
When St. Cecilia was established, the area surrounding the parish was predominantly white. In the 1960s, African-Americans began moving into the neighborhood. By the mid-1990s, the neighborhood was made up mostly of Latino immigrants.

St. Cecilia went through a period of declining membership. With a pastor who did not speak Spanish in a neighborhood dominated by Spanish speakers, Masses "rarely topped 200 people, a fraction of the church's capacity."

In 1997, Father Luigi Zanotto, a Comboni Missionary, arrived at St. Cecilia. Under Zanotto's leadership, Colombian nuns were brought to the parish, and parishioners from Oaxaca were invited to arrange special Masses. In 2001, the parish acquired a painting of the Virgin of Soledad, a symbol of importance to Oaxacans. With the installation of the Virgin of Soledad, St. Cecilia became a center for Oaxacans from throughout Southern California.

Zanotto encouraged other ethnic groups in the community. A group of Guatemalan parishioners commissioned a 9-foot black wooden statue of the "Black Christ of Esquipulas", a national and religious icon for Guatemalans. Parishioners from El Salvador commissioned a statue of Salvador del Mundo, the patron saint of El Salvador.

A group of ethnic Nigerian parishioners installed a shrine to the Blessed Cyprian Michael Iwene Tansi, a Nigerian priest who was beatified by Pope John Paul II in 1998. The shrine was dedicated at a July 2003 mass presided over by Cardinal Francis Arinze, a Nigerian who has been mentioned as an eventual candidate for the papacy. A Nigerian priest, Father Michael Ekwutosi Ume, was brought in to celebrate a biweekly Mass in Igbo, "complete with traditional dancing and singing."

By 2003, Zanotto had turned St. Cecilia into a thriving multi-ethnic parish. In 2003, Zanotto was transferred to New Jersey.

When the new pastor ended the practice of holding monthly Masses honoring each ethnic saint, the parishioners resisted. After eight months, another pastor was installed, and he resumed the monthly ethnic Masses.

As of 2008, the congregation of St. Cecilia Church was made up mostly of Latino immigrants. Four Spanish language Masses are held at the church each Sunday.

== St. Cecilia School ==
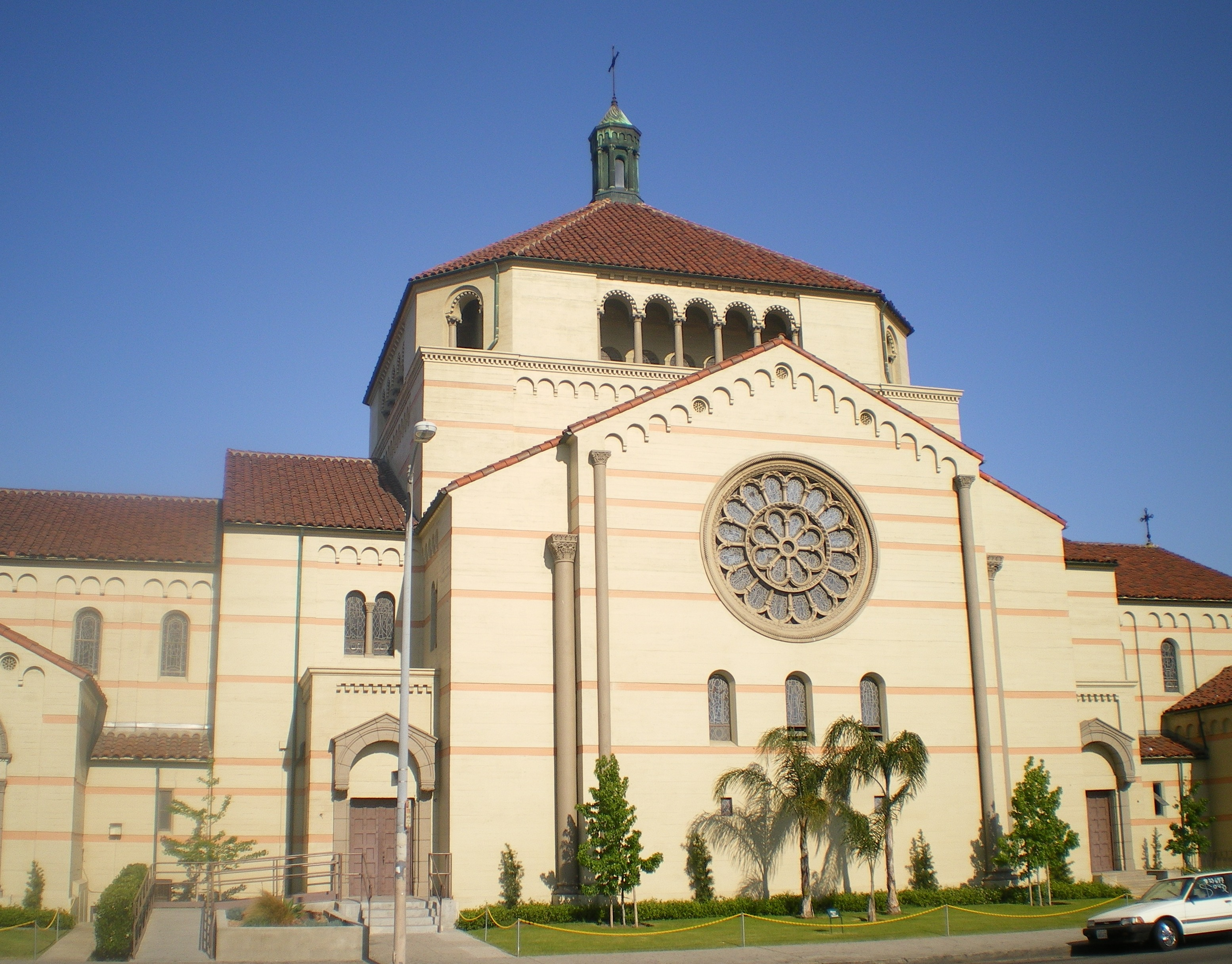
St. Cecilia from Normandie Avenue

In September 1916, the parish opened St. Cecilia's School serving grades 1–8. The school was operated by the Sisters of St. Joseph with Sister Mary Paul as the first principal.

As of 2009, the St. Cecilia school offered education for 272 students from kindergarten through the eighth grade.

== Mass schedule ==
As of 2021, the regular Mass schedule at St. Cecilia's included both English and Spanish services. English language Masses are offered at 9 a.m. on Sundays. Spanish language Masses are offered on Sundays at 7:00 a.m., 10:30 a.m., 12:30 p.m., 4:00 p.m., and 7:00 p.m.

== See also ==
- Our Lady of the Angels Pastoral Region
- Saint Cecilia
