= Hedgehoppers Anonymous =

1960s British band

- Origin: Peterborough, England
- Genres: Beat music, pop
- Years active: 1963–1966
- Label: Decca
- Past members: Mick Tinsley; John Stewart; Alan Laud; Ray Honeybull; Leslie Dash

Hedgehoppers Anonymous were a 1960s beat group from the United Kingdom. They formed in November 1963 as The Trendsetters, and became The Hedgehoppers the following year. Jonathan King took over their record production in 1965, and added Anonymous to their name. Their most successful single was "It's Good News Week".

== Singles ==
The major success of Hedgehoppers Anonymous was the King-produced and -written "It's Good News Week", issued on Decca in 1965. It reached No. 5 on the UK Singles Chart, and No. 48 on Billboard's Hot 100. This song has been used as the theme music for Good News Week, a satirical news-based comedy quiz show on Australian television which ran from 1996 to 2000 and was revived in 2008.

The group released four other tracks but did not achieve significant success. "Don't Push Me" only managed to reach the Bubbling Under Hot 100 chart in the US. while "Daytime" only appeared on Record Mirror's "Breakers List" (chart listing songs outside the Top 50). Without further success, the band soon broke up, and the lack of significant chart activity other than "It's Good News Week" leaves them labelled as one-hit wonders.

== Band members ==
Band members were Royal Air Force personnel. (Hedgehoppers was RAF slang for low flying aircraft).

== Singles ==
Year	Single	Chart Positions			Label
Year	Single	UK	AU	US	Label
1965	"It's Good News Week"	5	8	48	Decca F 12241
1965	"Don't Push Me"	—	28	123 (Note: Billboard Bubbling Under Hot 100 chart)	Decca F 12298
1966	"Baby (You're My Everything)"	—	—	—	Decca F 12400
1966	"Daytime"	58 (Note: Chart position from Record Mirror "Breakers List" (15 June 66))	—	—	Decca F 12479
1966	"Stop Press"	—	—	—	Decca F 12530

== See also ==
- List of performances on Top of the Pops
