= The Piglets =

British musical act

The Piglets were a British female outfit, and one of the pseudonyms Jonathan King used in the 1970s to release some of his songs. Their lead singer on Johnny Reggae was Barbara Kay. The Piglets are best remembered for "Johnny Reggae" (1971), released on Bell Records which reached No. 3 in the UK Singles Chart and was a global hit, charting in various other countries including Germany.

== Discography ==
=== Singles ===
(A and B sides of 7" singles)

- 1971: "Johnny Reggae" / "Backing Track" (UK No. 3) (Bell)
