= Leap Up and Down (Wave Your Knickers in the Air) =

Single by St. Cecelia
- B-side: "How You Gonna Tell Me"
- Released: 1971
- Genre: Novelty
- Label: Polydor
- Songwriter: Keith Hancock
- Producer: Jonathan King

Official audio
- "Leap Up and Down" on YouTube

"Leap Up and Down (Wave Your Knickers in the Air)" is a song and single by British band, St Cecelia. Written by Keith Hancock and produced by Jonathan King, it was first released in the UK in 1971.

== Background and chart success ==
The song was the only chart success by Corby band St Cecelia. It reached number 12 in the UK Singles Chart in 1971 and was in the chart for 17 weeks. On the New Zealand Listener chart it reached number 9. It is one of several novelty or Bubblegum songs from the 1970s with which producer King was involved.
