= Johnny Reggae =

Single by The Piglets
- Released: 1971
- Recorded: 1971
- Genre: Reggae
- Label: Bell Records
- Songwriter: Jonathan King
- Producer: Jonathan King

The Piglets singles chronology
"Johnny Reggae" (1971)	"This is Reggae" (1972)

Music video
- "Johnny Reggae" on YouTube

"Johnny Reggae" is a 1971 novelty song credited to The Piglets. The single cover states that it was "conceived, created, produced and directed by Jonathan King". It was released on Bell Records.

The song spent 12 weeks in the Top 100 of the UK singles chart, reaching a peak position of number 3 in the chart for 20 November 1971.

King himself has explained in comments on his YouTube channel and in his autobiography 65 My Life So Far that the vocalists were session singers "coached to sound like teenage scrubbers", and that the lead vocalist was session singer Barbara Kay, who also recorded as Kay Barry for Embassy Records.

The lead vocals have been at various times been incorrectly attributed to Adrienne Posta or Wendy Richard.

A follow-up single "This is Reggae" was released in 1972.

== Track list ==
- Side A: "Johnny Reggae"
- Side B: Backing track (of the song)

== Chart positions ==
Chart (1971)	Peak position
UK Singles Chart	3
