= Shadows of Love (Wax song) =

1986 song by Wax (British band)

Single by Wax

from the album Magnetic Heaven
- Released: 16 June 1986
- Length: 4:39
- Label: RCA
- Songwriter(s): Andrew Gold; Graham Gouldman
- Producer(s): Phil Thornalley

Wax singles chronology
"Right Between the Eyes" (1986)	"Shadows of Love" (1986)	"Systematic" (1986)

Music videos
- "Shadows of Love" (UK/European version) on YouTube
- "Shadows of Love" (North American version) on YouTube

"Shadows of Love" is a song by new wave duo Wax, released by RCA in 1986 as the third single from their debut studio album Magnetic Heaven. The song was written by band members Andrew Gold and Graham Gouldman, and produced by Phil Thornalley.

== Music videos ==
Two music videos were made for the single. The video for the UK and European market was directed by John Scarlett-Davis for the production company Aldabra. It features Wax performing the song in a "pop-up book" setting. The video for the North American market, which revolves around a young pair who meet in a bar, was directed by Storm Thorgerson and produced by Antony Taylor for PMI.

== Critical reception ==
Upon its release as a single, William Leith of NME described "Shadows of Love" as "not a bad start" for Wax. He noted that the "combination of swelling and pounding keyboard-patterns is workable, if a little childlike" and also added that the song is "a little chock with obvious rhymes". Adrian Bishop of The Western Gazette noted that the song is "built round the bass and synth, which make an effective combination, but it tails away into a poor MOR melody". He added that it "never reaches the heights of such solid Gold tracks as 'Lonely Boy' and 'Never Let Her Slip Away' or any of Gouldman's 10cc classics". Music & Media picked it as one of their "sure hits" in their issue of 5 July 1986 and added that it is a "remarkable" song from their "splendid [debut] album". In the US, Billboard described it as a "disco-pop tune elevated on one of the artier walls of sound".

== Track listing ==
7–inch single (UK, Europe, Australia and Japan)

1. "Shadows of Love" – 4:29
2. "Magnetic Heaven" – 3:30

7–inch promotional single (UK and Europe)

1. "Shadows of Love" (DJ version) – 4:14
2. "Magnetic Heaven" – 3:30

7–inch single (US and Canada)

1. "Shadows of Love" – 4:39
2. "Magnetic Heaven" – 3:30

7–inch promotional single (US and Canada)

1. "Shadows of Love" – 4:39
2. "Shadows of Love" – 4:39

12–inch single (UK and Europe)

1. "Shadows of Love" – 4:39
2. "Magnetic Heaven" – 3:30
3. "People All Over This World" – 3:40

== Personnel ==
Credits are adapted from the Magnetic Heaven vinyl LP liner notes and the 12-single vinyl single.

Wax

- Andrew Gold – vocals, backing vocals, keyboards, guitar, drums and programming
- Graham Gouldman – bass guitar, backing vocals

Production

- Phil Thornalley – producer and engineer ("Shadows of Love", "Magnetic Heaven")
- Andrew Gold, Graham Gouldman – producers ("People All Over This World")

Other

- Simon Fowler – photography
- Jason Bratby – front cover painting
- The Leisure Process – design, art direction

== Charts ==
Chart (1986)	Peak position
UK Singles Chart	151
