= American English (disambiguation) =

American English is a set of dialects of the English language native to the United States.

American English may also refer to:

== Linguistics ==
- General American English, a dialect of American English
- North American English, a set of dialects of the English language spoken in the United States and Canada

== Demographics ==
- American English people, English people whose ancestry originates wholly or partly in the United States
- English Americans, Americans whose ancestry originates wholly or partly in England

== Other uses ==
- American English (album) by Wax
  - "American English" (song), 1987
- "American English", a song by Idlewild from The Remote Part

== See also ==
- Standard American English (disambiguation)
- American (disambiguation)
- English (disambiguation)
- Americans, people born in the United States
