= In Some Other World =

Single by Wax

from the album American English
- Released: January 1988 (UK)
- Genre: Pop; Eurodisco
- Length: 4:45 (album version); 3:46 (single version)
- Label: RCA
- Songwriter(s): Andrew Gold; Graham Gouldman
- Producer(s): Christopher Neil

Wax singles chronology
"American English" (1987)	"In Some Other World" (1988)	"Wherever You Are" (1989)

"In Some Other World" is a song by British duo Wax, which was released in 1988 as the third and final single from their second studio album American English (1987). The song was written by band members Andrew Gold and Graham Gouldman, and produced by Christopher Neil.

"In Some Other World" failed to make an appearance on the UK Singles Chart, but was a top 40 success in Belgium, where it reached No. 37 on the Ultratop 50 Flanders chart in April 1988. The song's music video was directed by Storm Thorgerson.

== Critical reception ==
On its release, Music & Media described "In Some Other World" as "first-rate pure pop" and "full of bouncing excitement". Terry Staunton of New Musical Express considered the song to be a "sub-Level 42 workout, saved only by the weird sleeve which depicts a Jonathan Ross lookalike French-kissing a Tiny Tears doll". Tony Beard of Record Mirror wrote, "Horrific Euro-disco that is downright offensive. A polished dross full of bouncy, kiddie-keyboards, nauseating vocals and references to fire and brimstone, tax refunds, ivory towers and joke false teeth."

In a review of American English, Robin Denselow of The Guardian commented, "Wax write and perform utterly professional, well-crafted pop songs that may not be memorable but are certainly clever, and sometimes even brave. 'In Some Other World', an attack on American TV evangelists and politicians, is not what the MOR synth-pop audience will be expecting." Jim Bohen of the Daily Record wrote, "'In Some Other World' savages televangelists and media-minded politicians, but with a twist: It blames their constituents for patronizing them."

== Track listing ==
7" single

1. "In Some Other World" – 3:46
2. "People All Over This World" – 3:40

12" single

1. "In Some Other World" – 4:45
2. "People All Over This World" – 3:40
3. "Ball and Chain" (Chainsaw Mix) – 8:37

== Personnel ==
Wax

- Andrew Gold – lead vocals, backing vocals, keyboards, drums
- Graham Gouldman – guitar, bass, backing vocals

Production

- Christopher Neil – producer on "In Some Other World"
- Simon Hurrell – recording, engineer and mixing on "In Some Other World"
- Peter Jones – assistant recording and assistant mixing on "In Some Other World"
- Andrew Gold, Graham Gouldman – producers on "People All Over This World"
- Phil Thornalley – producer on "Ball and Chain"
- Ian Cooper – mastering on "In Some Other World"

Other

- Nexus – cover design
- Storm Thorgerson – art direction

== Charts ==
Chart (1988)	Peak position
Belgium (Ultratop 50 Flanders)	37
