= And Another Thing... (album) =

Studio album by Graham Gouldman
- Released: 2000
- Genre: Pop, Rock
- Length: 44:14
- Label: Four Your Love/Dome Records
- Producer: Graham Gouldman, Andrew Gold, Claudio Guidetti, Mike Stevens, Rick Fenn, Miles Benedict

Graham Gouldman chronology
Animalympics (1980)	And Another Thing... (2000)	Love and Work (2012)

Professional ratings
Review scores
Source	Rating
Allmusic	4/5 stars

And Another Thing... is the third studio album by 10cc bassist Graham Gouldman released in 2000. The album is a mix of newly written songs and new versions of tracks from earlier stages of Gouldman's musical career. The album's title is a reference to Gouldman's first solo album, released in 1968: The Graham Gouldman Thing, which utilized the same concept.

== Overview ==
The album includes new Gouldman's versions of: "Heart Full of Soul", a major hit for the Yardbirds in 1965; "You Stole My Love", first recorded by The Mockingbirds released circa 1966, the band that featured Gouldman, Bernard Basso, Stephen Jacobson and Kevin Godley (the new version of the song features chorus of another of Gouldman's songs, 'Schoolgirl'; "Ready To Go Home", a song from 10cc's album Mirror Mirror that reflects the passing of Graham's father; "Sometimes" and "Can Anybody See You?" from Wax releases The Wax Files and Common Knowledge.com respectively.

Among the new songs "Walking With Angels" was co-written with Nashville session guitarist and writer Gordon Kennedy, responsible for Eric Clapton's "Change the World", while "Dancing Days' was co-written with former Nashville Songwriter of the Year Gary Burr. Several songs were written with Gary Barlow, former Take That front man, but only one, "Walkin' Away", was included on the album.

The album features long-time Gouldman collaborator Andrew Gold on six tracks and former 10cc guitarist Rick Fenn on two tracks. Former Squeeze singer-songwriter Chris Difford also assisted, along with Madness singer Graham McPherson (a.k.a. Suggs).

On the unlisted bonus track, Gouldman plays a simple guitar accompaniment as he sings a light-hearted post-script to his 23-year career in 10cc, presumably repeating the questions most asked since the band's 1995 breakup:

What comes first,

The music or the words?
Do you still see Kev and Lol?
Did you split amicably,
You and the lads in 10cc?
Where did you get your name from?
Go and ask Jonathan King
Sing
"Art for Art’s Sake", "Wall Street Shuffle"
"Rubber Bullets" and "The Dean and I"
"I'm Not in Love" and "Dreadlock Holiday"
Will you tell me why oh why
Did 1983

See the end of 10cc?

== Track listing ==
No.	Title	Writer(s)	Producer(s)	Length
1.	"You Stole My Love"	Graham Gouldman, Barry Greenfield	Gouldman, Andrew Gold	3:12
2.	"Walking With Angels"	Gouldman, Gordon Kennedy	Gouldman, Gold	5:23
3.	"Dancing Days"	Gouldman, Gary Burr	Gouldman, Gold	3:56
4.	"Just Another Day"	Gouldman, Claudio Guidetti, Frank Musker	Gouldman, Claudio Guidetti	4:07
5.	"Sometimes"	Gouldman, Andrew Gold	Gouldman, Gold	3:53
6.	"There Was a Day"	Gouldman, Chris Difford, Graham McPherson	Gouldman, Mike Stevens, Simon Whitfield	3:47
7.	"Heart Full of Soul"	Gouldman	Gouldman, Rick Fenn	3:15
8.	"Ready to Go Home"	Gouldman, Gold	Gouldman, Miles Benedict	4:27
9.	"Single Tonight"	Gouldman, Guidetti, Musker	Gouldman, Guidetti	4:03
10.	"Walkin' Away"	Gouldman, Gary Barlow	Gouldman, Gold	3:23
11.	"Can Anybody See You?"	Gouldman, Gold	Gouldman, Gold	3:23
12.	"Untitled" (hidden track)			0:37

== Personnel ==
- Graham Gouldman – vocals, guitars, bass
- Andrew Gold – backing vocals, keyboards, drums, guitar, slide guitar, drum programming, piano, organ, harmonica (except "Just Another Day", "There Was a Day", "Heart Full of Soul", "Ready to Go Home", "Single Tonight")
- Gordon Kennedy – guitar solo on "Walking With Angels"
- Claudio Guidetti – backing vocals ("Just Another Day"), keyboards, guitars ("Just Another Day" and "Single Tonight"), drum programming and percussion ("Single Tonight")
- Rick Fenn – drum programming ("There Was a Day" and "Heart Full of Soul"), backing vocals, guitars ("Heart Full of Soul")
- Chris Difford – backing vocals on "There Was a Day"
- Graham McPherson – backing vocals on "There Was a Day"
- Elio Rivagli – drums on "Just Another Day"
- Mike Stevens – backing vocals, keyboards, flute on "There Was a Day"
- Jonny Dyke – organ on "There Was a Day"
- Miles Benedict – keyboards, drum programming on "Ready to Go Home"
- Lincoln Jean-Marie – lead vocals, backing vocals on "Ready to Go Home"
