= The Last to Know (Johnny Hates Jazz song) =

1991 song by Johnny Hates Jazz

Single by Johnny Hates Jazz

from the album Tall Stories
- B-side: "Shelter from the Storm"
- Released: 29 July 1991 (Europe); 6 January 1992 (UK)
- Length: 3:36
- Label: Virgin
- Songwriter: Phil Thornalley
- Producers: Calvin Hayes; Mike Nocito

Johnny Hates Jazz singles chronology
"Let Me Change Your Mind Tonight" (1991)	"The Last to Know" (1991)	"Magnetized" (2013)

"The Last to Know" is a song by English band Johnny Hates Jazz, released by Virgin in 1991 as the second and final single from their second studio album, Tall Stories. The song was written by Phil Thornalley and was produced by Calvin Hayes and Mike Nocito. It reached number 57 in the Official German Charts and number 78 in the UK Singles Chart.

== Background ==
In a 1992 interview, Mike Nocito said of the song, "I don't think that I sufficiently mixed up the horns of 'The Last to Know'. When someone else is brought in to mix, there are bound to be things that you would change yourself."

== Release ==
"The Last to Know" was issued as a single in Europe on 29 July 1991. It became a minor hit in Germany, peaking at number 57 in the Official German Charts on 4 November 1991. It was not issued as a single in the UK until 6 January 1992, where it preceded the UK release of Tall Stories by a month. The song failed to reach the top 75 of the UK Singles Chart, stalling at number 78 during its second week in the charts on 25 January 1992.

== Critical reception ==
Upon its release as a single in the UK, the Accrington Observer awarded it a three out of five star rating and commented, "Johnny Hates Jazz attempt a time warp trip back to those heady days of 'Turn Back the Clock' and 'Shattered Dreams'. Almost works too... but not quite. Bowls along rather than strikes a chord. Not so easy to turn back the clock, eh lads?" Jane Downing of the Sunday Sun described it as "by far the best track on the LP".

== Track listing ==
7–inch single (Europe)

1. "The Last to Know" – 3:36
2. "Shelter from the Storm" – 2:08

CD single (Germany)

1. "The Last to Know" – 3:36
2. "Shelter from the Storm" – 2:08

7–inch and cassette single (UK)

1. "The Last to Know" – 3:36
2. "Fools Gold" – 4:29

CD single (UK)

1. "The Last to Know" – 3:36
2. "Fools Gold" – 4:29
3. "Between You and Me" – 3:12

== Personnel ==
Credits are adapted from the Tall Stories vinyl LP liner notes and the German and UK CD singles.

Johnny Hates Jazz

- Phil Thornalley
- Calvin Hayes
- Mike Nocito

Additional musicians

- Frank Ricotti – percussion and vibes solo ("The Last to Know")
- Ole Paulsen – additional keyboards ("The Last to Know")
- Kick Horns (Simon C. Clarke, Roddy Lorimer, Tim Sanders, Paul Spong) – horns ("The Last to Know")

Production

- Calvin Hayes – producer and mixer ("The Last to Know", "Shelter from the Storm", "Fools Gold")
- Mike Nocito – producer and mixer ("The Last to Know", "Shelter from the Storm", "Fools Gold"), engineer (all tracks)
- Roy Spong – mixer ("The Last to Know", "Fools Gold")
- François Kevorkian – mixer ("Between You and Me")
- Goh Hotoda – mixer ("Between You and Me")

== Charts ==
Chart (1991–1992)	Peak position
Germany (GfK)	57
UK Singles Chart (OCC)	78
