= Crosley Radio =

Audio electronic manufacturing company (post-1993)

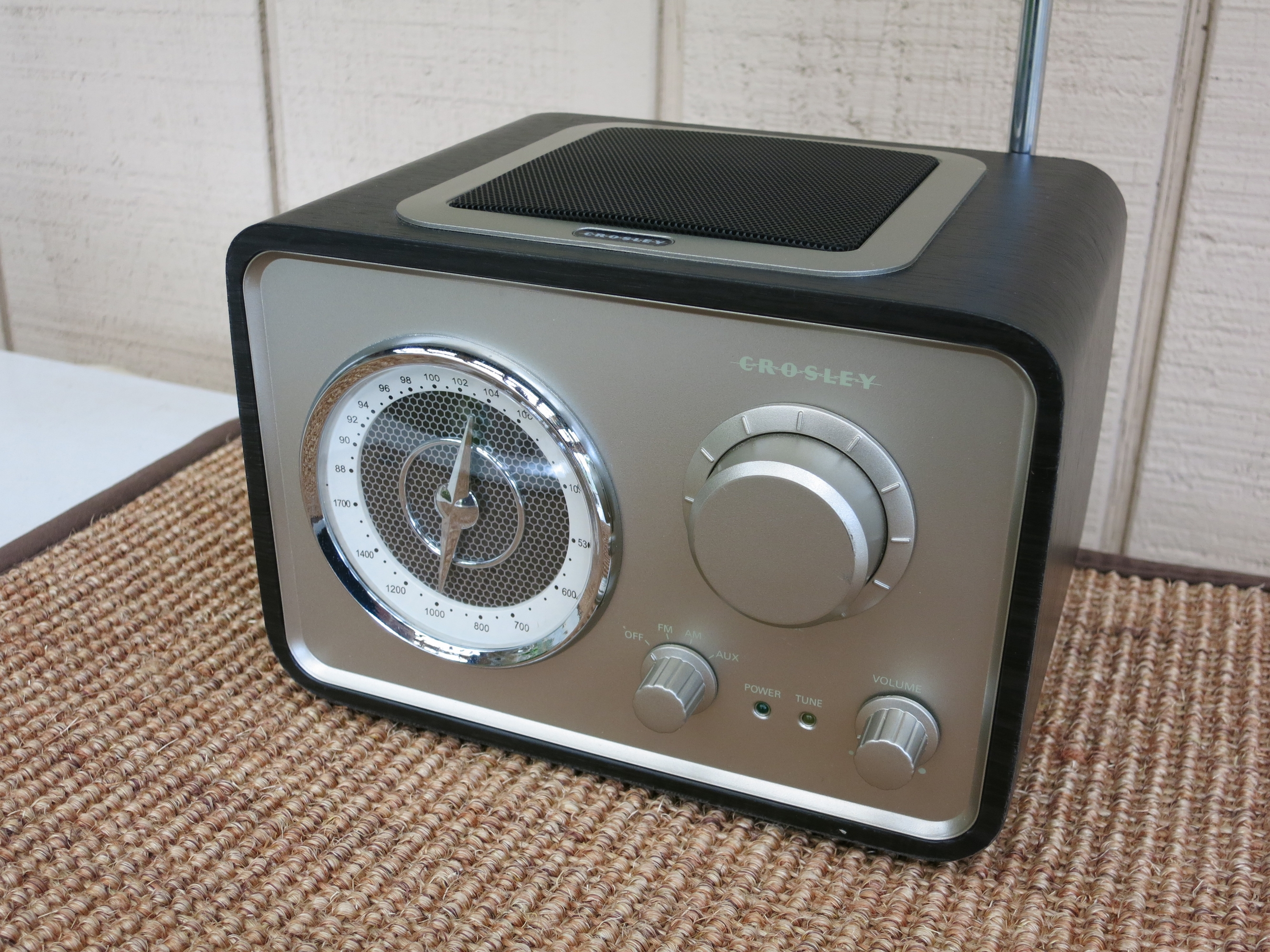
- Modern Crosley radio – the CR3003A
- Predecessor: Crosley Corporation
- Founded: 1984; 42 years ago
- Headquarters: Louisville, Kentucky, United States
- Parent: Modern Marketing Concepts, Inc.
- Website: crosleyradio.com

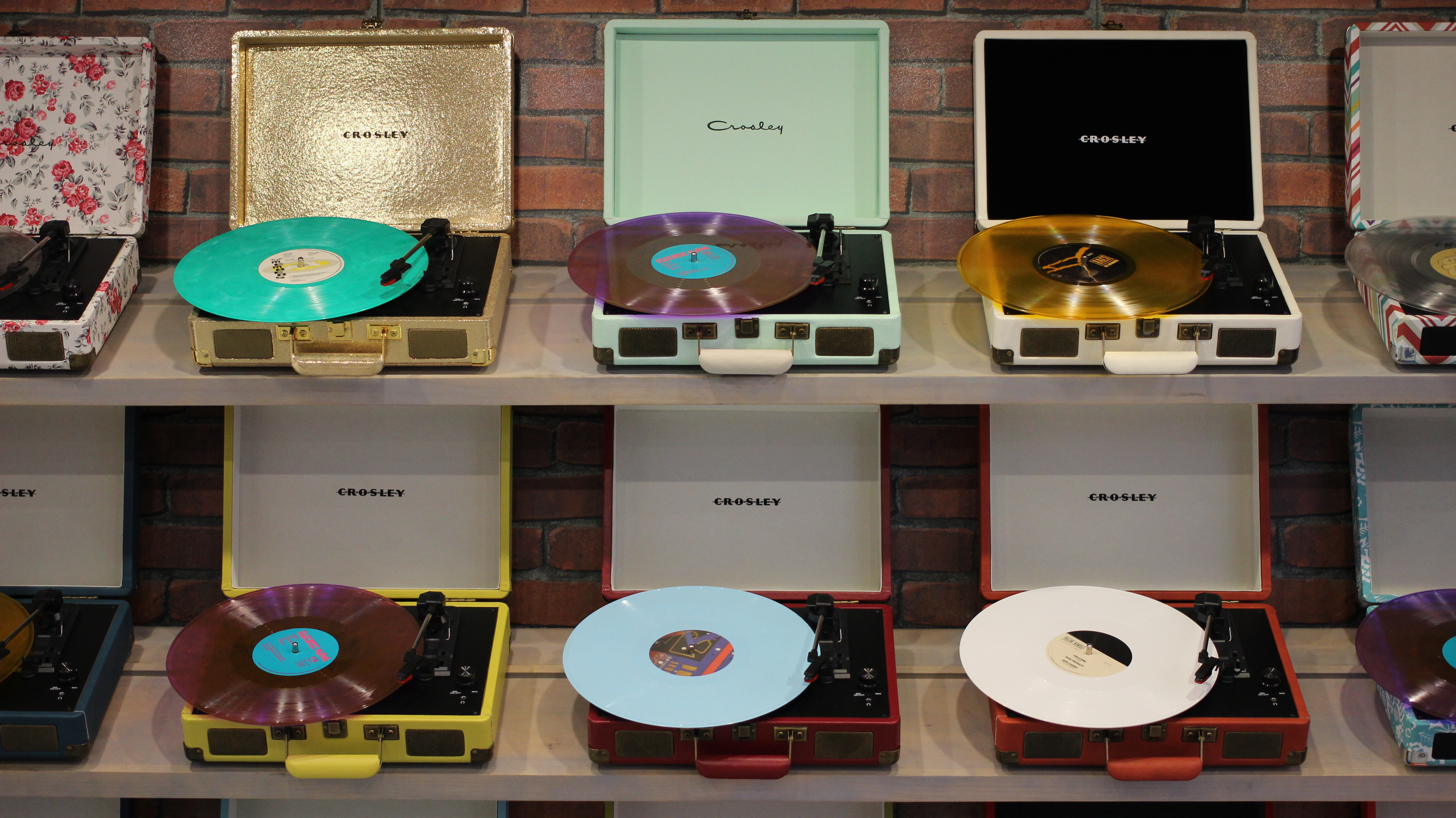
Crosley turntables

Crosley Radio is an audio electronic manufacturing company headquartered in Louisville, Kentucky. It takes its name from the original Crosley Radio Corporation which operated from 1921 to 1956. The business is incorporated as Modern Marketing Concepts, Inc. and is also known as Crosley Brands. Bo LeMastus was its chief executive as of 2018. It sells turntables, radios and jukeboxes styled after older consumer electronics, and it manufactures in Asia.

The Cruiser, a portable record player built into a suitcase-style case with its own speakers, sells for about $80 and is stocked by chains such as Target and Urban Outfitters. The company sold more than 1.5 million record players in 2017.

Reviewers have criticized the Cruiser and similar models for poor sound and build quality, and for a tracking force heavy enough to wear records. Since 2015 Crosley has also sold more expensive turntables, which it says were a response to those complaints.

== History ==
Bo LeMastus joined the business in 1983 as an intern while studying at Western Kentucky University. He worked as a traveling sales representative, selling Crosley-branded jukeboxes and wooden radios that looked like models from the 1930s to the 1950s to catalog retailers such as Spiegel, Fingerhut and Sharper Image, and he later became chief executive. Modern Marketing Concepts, Inc. was incorporated in Kentucky on February 21, 1984.

The Crosley name had gone unused after the original company was sold in the 1950s. According to The Guardian, it was bought in 1976 by a company called Brown-Rogers-Dixson, and LeMastus first licensed the name and then bought it outright early in the 21st century. The Crosley trademark had been registered in the United States in 1981. The registration covers radios and is now held by Modern Marketing Concepts.

In 1991-92 the American supplier from which the company bought its electronics went out of business. Electronics then made up about 90 percent of sales. LeMastus flew to southern China, where the products were made, and agreed to buy six months' worth of goods directly from the factory. By 2018 the company manufactured across Asia and had an office in Shenzhen.

Around 1990 a Crosley buyer saw a small turntable at a trade show and added it to the range the company sold to gift stores. The audio writer Michael Fremer wrote that it soon became the company's biggest-selling item. The company sold through Kmart and Sears in the 1990s, and its business improved after Restoration Hardware began stocking one of its turntables.

Since 2020 the company has produced licensed products related to The Beatles through partnerships with Sony Music Publishing, including themed record players and accessories.

== Products ==
The Cruiser Deluxe that PCWorld was a belt-driven player in a latching suitcase-style case, with two built-in speakers, three playback speeds, pitch control and Bluetooth. In 2015 Crosley announced the C10 and C100, which were among its first turntables not built into a case. The C10 was made in the factory of Pro-Ject and was, according to The Vinyl Factory, a rebadged Pro-Ject Debut III. The C65, a turntable sold with a pair of separate speakers for $300, went on sale in the United States in 2024.

In 2017 Crosley introduced the Vinyl Rocket, a vinyl jukebox capable of holding up to 70 seven-inch records and playing both sides for up to 140 selections. It was built by hand in the United Kingdom and priced at $13,000.

== Reception ==
Crosley has been criticized for both the sound and the build quality of its players. Alexis Petridis wrote in The Guardian in 2016 that the Crosley he bought for his nine-year-old daughter had "admittedly awful sound quality" and a tonearm so flimsy that he stuck a coin to the cartridge to stop it jumping, though he thought it suited a child's first record player. Another writer in the same article said that most new turntables bought in Britain were made by Crosley and that "all its players sound absolutely terrible".

What Hi-Fi? measured the Cruiser's tracking force at just over 7 grams in 2015, against about 2.5 grams on most turntables, and noted that the arm could not be adjusted.

Paul Rigby of The Vinyl Factory recommended the C10 in 2016 and dismissed the C100 as "a nice sounding toy". Rolling Stone wrote in 2025 that Crosley's suitcase players "may not have a reputation for high-fidelity audio" but had been many listeners' introduction to record collecting. Crosley's marketing director said in 2016 that the company followed criticism on audio forums and that the feedback had led to its higher-priced models.
