= Common Knowledge.com =

Studio album by Wax
- Released: 1998
- Recorded: 1984, 1996 - 1998
- Length: 62:18
- Label: For Your Love
- Producer: Andrew Gold, Graham Gouldman

Wax chronology
The Wax Files (1997)	Common Knowledge.com (1998)	Bikini (2000)

Singles from Common Knowledge.com
- 1. "Don't Break My Heart" Released: 1984; 2. "Victoria" Released: 1985

Professional ratings
Review scores
Source	Rating
AllMusic	3/5 stars

Common Knowledge.com (stylised as common knowledge.com) is the fourth and final studio album by the English New Wave Duo Wax. Released in 1998. It combines an unreleased album dating back to 1984 with several new tracks.

== Overview ==
The core of the album consist of the material recorded by Andrew Gold and Graham Gouldman around 1984. The sessions originally spawned two singles under the name Common Knowledge, "Don't Break My Heart" and "Victoria". While the singles failed to get any attention the album was shelved and Gold and Gouldman started anew under the name Wax, which resulted in their debut Magnetic Heaven.

The Common Knowledge tracks remained untouched until 1996 when Andrew Gold re-recorded a solo version of "The King of Showbiz" for his album ...Since 1951.

In 1997 additional original tracks were released: "Holiday" and "One More Heartache" were included on the compilation album The Wax Files, while "The King of Showbiz" was featured on Andrew Gold's Greetings From Planet Love (released under the name The Fraternal Order of the All).

The original album was finally released in full in 1998 along with three new tracks: "Shanghai Moon", written and recorded in collaboration with Stephen Bishop, "Sometimes" and "First Time In Love", the latter taken from Gold's ...Since 1951.

The digital edition of the album also features 5 of the 6 new Wax tracks released on The Wax Files (with the absence of “Same Boat Now”) and a live version of "Thank You for Being a Friend", originally the b-side to "Anchors Aweigh" single and also from The Wax Files.

== Track listing ==
All songs were written by Andrew Gold and Graham Gouldman, except where noted.

1. "Shanghai Moon" – 5:34 (Gold, Gouldman, Stephen Bishop)
2. "Sometimes" – 3:51
3. "First Time In Love" – 3:51
4. "Victoria" – 3:51
5. "Don't Break My Heart" – 3:27
6. "Let's Have Some Lunch Sometime" – 3:38
7. "The King of Showbiz" – 4:22
8. "Holiday" – 4:45
9. "Big Brother" – 2:57
10. "Separate Limos" – 4:54
11. "All Over You" – 4:25
12. "J.B. In Arabia" – 4:24
13. "One More Heartache" – 5:02 (Smokey Robinson, Warren Moore, Ronald White, Bobby Rogers, Marv Tarplin)
14. "Big Fat Baby" – 3:18
15. "Heartbeat to Heartbeat" – 3:59

Bonus tracks on the digital edition
No.	Title	Writer(s)	Length
16.	"Under Her Spell"		4:32
17.	"Baby's Got A Gun"		4:19
18.	"Claire And Johnny"		4:56
19.	"Can Anybody See You?"		4:12
20.	"Touch And Go"		3:51
21.	"Thank You for Being a Friend (Live Version)"	Gold	4:45
