= Alive (10cc album) =

Live album by 10cc
- Released: 25 July 1993
- Recorded: 23–24 March 1993
- Venue: Mielparque Hall, Japan; GotandaYu-Port Hall
- Genre: Progressive pop; pop rock; art rock
- Label: Polydor
- Producer: Eric Stewart

10cc chronology
...Meanwhile (1991)	Alive (1993)	Mirror Mirror (1995)

Highlights version cover

Professional ratings
Review scores
Source	Rating
Allmusic	2.5/5 stars

Alive is a live album by 10cc released in 1993. It was recorded in Japan during the opening nights of the band's comeback tour following the release of the album ...Meanwhile.

== Overview ==
The line-up of 10cc for the tour consisted of core members Eric Stewart and Graham Gouldman, longtime 10cc members Rick Fenn and Stuart Tosh and newcomers Stephen Pigott on keyboards and Gary Wallis on drums.

The album is notable to feature several cover versions, which is not typical for 10cc shows. They include two Beatles covers, "Paperback Writer" and “Across the Universe”, along with a version of "Slow Down" by Larry Williams, which was also recorded by The Beatles.

== Release and reception ==
The album was originally released in two variations: a 15 track 2-CD set and a 12 track single CD highlights version titled Alive: The Very Best Of, which omitted "Paperback Writer", "Shine a Light in the Dark" and "Slow Down".

The album was reissued several times with titles Alive: The Classic Hits Tour, Alive in Japan and Live in Japan. Separate releases of two discs were also available.

The video release was also made under the titles Alive: The Classic Hits Tour and Live in Japan.

In 2007 the album tracks were rearranged into the 11 track promo album The Best of 10cc Live given away for free with British newspaper The Mail on Sunday.

== Track listing ==
All tracks composed by Eric Stewart and Graham Gouldman, except where indicated

CD one

1. "The Wall Street Shuffle"
2. "I'm Mandy Fly Me" (Stewart, Gouldman, Kevin Godley)
3. "Good Morning Judge"
4. "Welcome to Paradise"
5. "The Things We Do for Love"
6. "Across the Universe" (John Lennon, Paul McCartney)
7. "The Stars Didn’t Show"
8. "Art for Art's Sake"
9. "Paperback Writer" (Lennon, McCartney)
10. "Shine a Light in the Dark"

CD two

1. "Feel the Benefit"
2. "Dreadlock Holiday"
3. "I'm Not in Love"
4. "Bullets Medley: Rubber Bullets / Silly Love / Life Is a Minestrone" (Godley, Lol Creme, Gouldman / Stewart, Creme / Stewart, Creme)
5. "Slow Down" (Larry Williams)

== Personnel ==
- Eric Stewart – vocals, guitars, keyboards
- Graham Gouldman – vocals, bass, guitars
- Rick Fenn – vocals, guitars, bass
- Stuart Tosh – vocals, percussion
- Stephen Pigott – keyboards
- Gary Wallis – drums

== Charts ==
Chart (1993)	Peak position
Netherlands MegaCharts	88
