= Right Between the Eyes (Wax song) =

Single by Wax

from the album Magnetic Heaven
- B-side: "Only a Visitor"
- Released: 26 February 1986
- Genre: New wave
- Label: RCA
- Songwriters: Andrew Gold, Graham Gouldman
- Producer: Phil Thornalley

Wax singles chronology
"Ball and Chain" (1985)	"Right Between the Eyes" (1986)	"Shadows of Love" (1986)

"Right Between the Eyes" is a song by English duo Wax. It appears on their 1986 debut album Magnetic Heaven, and was released as the duo's second single from the album on 26 February 1986.

== Reception ==
The song became a No. 1 hit in Spain and a moderate hit in Ireland, Belgium and the Netherlands. it reached No. 43 in the US on the Billboard Hot 100 and No. 42 on the Cash Box Top 100. On the UK, the song managed a peak charting of No. 60.

== Track listing ==
- U.S. / U.K. 7”
1. “Right Between the Eyes”- 4:08
2. “Only a Visitor”- 5:00
- U.S. / U.K. 12”
1. “Right Between the Eyes (Extended Mix)”- 6:57
2. “Only a Visitor”- 5:00

== Charts ==
Chart (1986)	Peak position
Belgium (Ultratop 50 Flanders)	18
Ireland (IRMA)	28
Netherlands (Single Top 100)	24
Spain (AFYVE)	1
UK Singles (Official Charts)	60
US Cash Box Top 100	42
US Billboard Hot 100	43

== Personnel ==
- Andrew Gold – lead vocals, electric guitar, synthesizer, drums
- Graham Gouldman – bass, backing vocals
