= American English (song) =

1987 song by Wax (British band)

Single by Wax

from the album American English
- Released: 1987
- Length: 4:25 (album version); 3:50 (single version)
- Label: RCA
- Songwriter(s): Andrew Gold; Graham Gouldman
- Producer(s): Christopher Neil

Wax singles chronology
"Bridge to Your Heart" (1987)	"American English" (1987)	"In Some Other World" (1988)

Music video
- "American English" on YouTube

"American English" is a song by new wave duo Wax, released by RCA in 1987 as the second single from their second studio album American English. The song was written by band members Andrew Gold and Graham Gouldman, and produced by Christopher Neil. The song's music video was directed by Storm Thorgerson.

== Critical reception ==
Upon its release as a single, Mike Dillon of The Paisley Daily Express commented, "[As] the follow-up to 'Bridge to Your Heart', this single should not have much trouble making it two in a row for Messrs Gold and Gouldman. With its big production and very excellent chorus, you'll be hooked on it in no time." Ben Thompson of NME was less enthusiastic, writing, "Wax's clash of the two mighty and unpredictable talents of Gouldman and Gold does not produce quite the fireworks that could have been expected."

== Track listing ==
7-inch single (UK, Europe, South Africa and Australia)

1. "American English" – 3:50
2. "Marie Claire " – 4:07

12-inch single (UK, Germany and Australia)

1. "American English" (The Concorde Mix) – 5:08
2. "Hear No Evil" (Full Length Mix) – 7:12
3. "Marie Claire" – 4:07

== Personnel ==
Credits are adapted from the American English vinyl LP liner notes and the 12-single vinyl single.

Wax

- Andrew Gold – vocals, backing vocals, keyboards, drums and programming
- Graham Gouldman – guitar, bass guitar, backing vocals

Additional musicians

- Adrian Lee – keyboards
- Wix Wickens – keyboards
- Peter Van Hooke – drums and programming
- Lorna Wright, Raissa Danilou, Kyoko Ono, Ruth Cuenca – speakers

Production

- Christopher Neil – producer ("American English")
- Simon Hurrell – engineer, recording ("American English")
- Peter Jones – assistant engineer, recording assistant ("American English")
- Andrew Gold – producer ("Marie Claire", "Hear No Evil"), mixing ("Hear No Evil")
- Graham Gouldman – producer ("Marie Claire", "Hear No Evil")
- Phil Thornalley – mixing ("Marie Claire")

Other

- Nexus – cover design
- Storm Thorgerson – art direction

== Charts ==
Chart (1987)	Peak position
Belgium (Ultratop 50 Flanders)	29
Netherlands (Single Top 100)	96
