= Wax (British band) =

British musical duo formed in Manchester

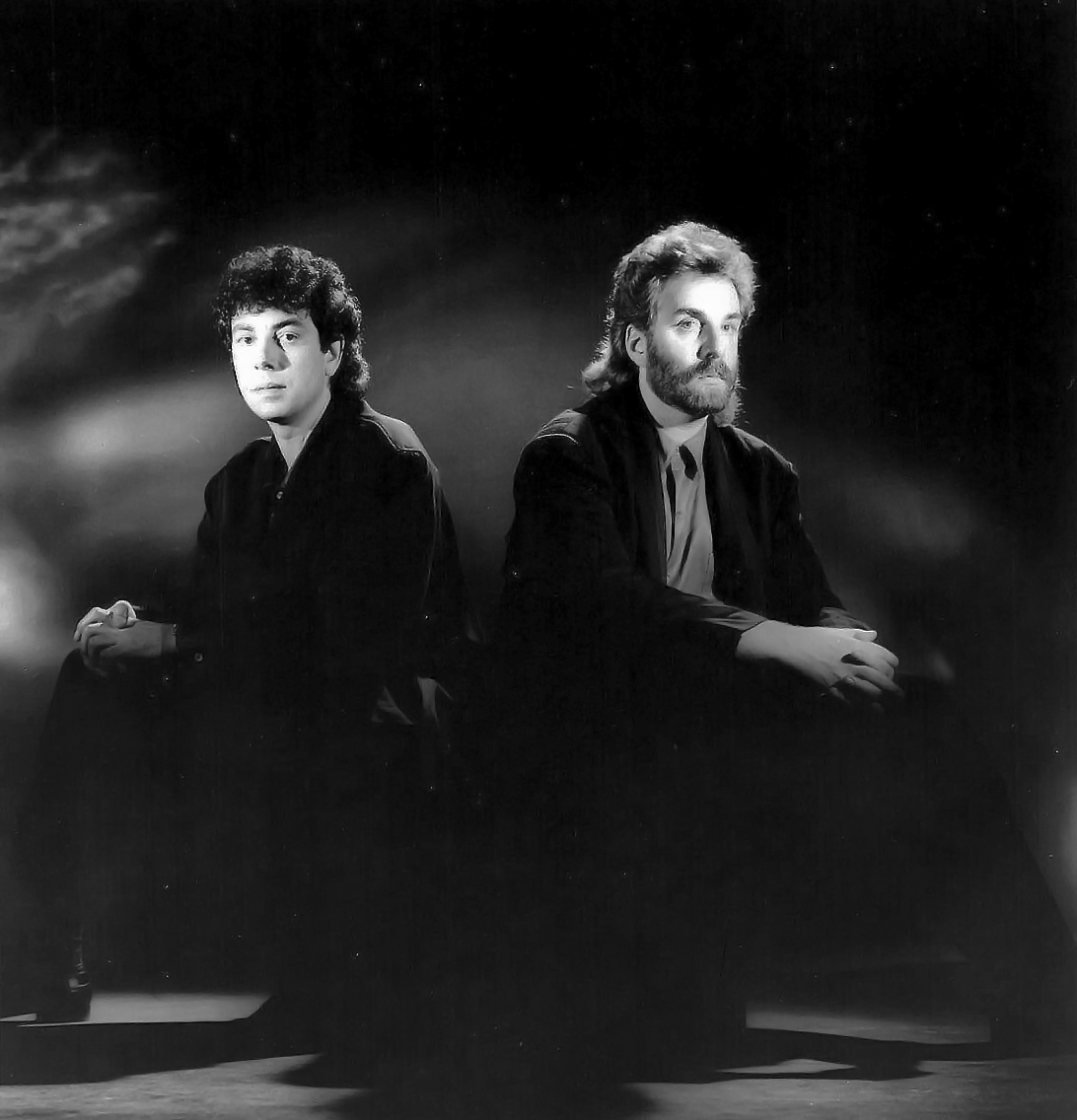
- Wax in 1986

Background information
- Also known as: Wax UK; World in Action; Common Knowledge
- Origin: Manchester, England
- Genres: New wave; Pop rock; Art rock
- Years active: 1983–1990; 1997–2000
- Labels: RCA; Cherry Red
- Past members: Andrew Gold; Graham Gouldman

Wax were an English-American new wave superduo based in Manchester, England, consisting of American singer-songwriter Andrew Gold and 10cc guitarist/bassist Graham Gouldman. They are best known for their European hit singles "Bridge to Your Heart" and "Right Between the Eyes". In the US, they were listed as Wax UK, while later releases were additionally credited as Andrew Gold & Graham Gouldman.

== History ==
=== Premise ===
In 1981, 10cc was working on what would become the album Ten Out of 10. Andrew Gold was invited to record with the band by Lenny Waronker, head of A&R at Warner Bros, and played bass, guitar, keyboards and percussion on the completed album, as well as adding background vocals. The U.S. release of Ten Out of 10 featured three songs co-written and co-produced by Gold: "Power of Love," "Runaway" and "We’ve Heard It All Before". It led to an offer to join the band – an offer Gold declined because of other commitments.

=== Initial work ===
After 10cc split in 1983, Graham Gouldman persuaded Gold to visit him at his home in Mottram St Andrew, England, to write and record some songs. While the intent was for Gold to only spend several weeks, Gold ended up staying for seven months. During this period, they wrote enough songs for an album. They chose World in Action as the band name and released a debut single, "Don't Break My Heart." However, to avoid confusion with a current affairs ITV programme also named World in Action, the group's name was changed to Common Knowledge. Subsequent pressings of the single were released under the new name. A second single, "Victoria", was released, but both singles failed to get any attention, and the album was shelved.

Under the supervision of Harvey Lisberg, Gouldman's long-time manager, the pair started working on songs for a new album, and took the name Wax. They signed with RCA Records, and released three studio albums between 1986 and 1989. The band's best known singles during that period were "Right Between the Eyes" and "Bridge to Your Heart". Bridge to Your Heart became a European hit: it was supported by European TV appearances including performances of the song on the Uk's Top of the Pops and the German series Peter's Pop Show.

The band's third album, A Hundred Thousand in Fresh Notes, failed to achieve the level of success of its predecessor and both Gold and Gouldman went on to continue with other ventures.

=== Break ===
In the beginning of 1990, Gouldman was offered the chance to reform 10cc with Eric Stewart. They got back together to record the group's comeback album ...Meanwhile, on which Andrew Gold also appeared, adding guitar to the track "Charity Begins at Home". Andrew Gold himself re-formed Bryndle with its original members to record their self-titled debut album.

Gouldman and Stewart continued as 10cc and their next album, Mirror Mirror, also featured Gold. His contributions were backing vocals on "Grow Old with Me" and lead vocals on "Ready to Go Home", the latter co-written by Gold and Gouldman. Despite Gold not being an official member of 10cc, the band still released "Ready to Go Home" with his lead vocals.

=== Later work ===
After 10cc's second split, Andrew Gold and Graham Gouldman continued to work together both as Wax and on each other's solo records. First new Wax material resulted in The Wax Files compilation album released in 1997, putting together six new songs, two previously unreleased Common Knowledge tracks, and already released material from the 1980s.

In 1998, their Common Knowledge album was finally released as Common Knowledge.com, with several new tracks, under the Wax name.

A collection of out-takes and rarities, Bikini, was released in 2000. A live album was released in 2019 featuring a 1987 concert.

== Discography ==
=== Studio albums ===
Title	Album details	Peak chart positions					
Title	Album details	UK	AUS	GER	NLD	SWE	US
Magnetic Heaven	Released: 1986; Label: RCA	—	—	65	—	47	101
American English	Released: 1987; Label: RCA	59	86	—	41	8	—
A Hundred Thousand in Fresh Notes	Released: 1989; Label: RCA	—	—	—	—	—	—
Common Knowledge.com	Released: 1998; Label: For Your Love	—	—	—	—	—	—
"—" denotes items that did not chart or were not released in that territory.

=== Live albums ===
Title	Album details
Live in Concert 1987	Released: 2019; Label: Cherry Red

=== Compilation albums ===
Title	Album details
Works: Best of Andrew Gold & Graham Gouldman	Released: 1996; Label: Camden
The Wax Files	Released: 1997; Label: For Your Love
Bikini	Released: 2000; Label: Quarkbrain

=== Box Sets ===
Title	Album details
Box of Wax	Released: 2022; Label: Renaissance

=== Singles ===
Year	Title	Chart positions										Album
Year	Title	UK	AUS	BEL	GER	IRE	NLD	SPA	SWE	US BB	US CB	Album
1984	"Don't Break My Heart" (as World in Action / Common Knowledge)	137	–	–	–	–	–	–	–	–	–	common knowledge.com
1985	"Victoria" (as Common Knowledge)	–	–	–	–	–	–	–	–	–	–	common knowledge.com
1985	"Ball and Chain"	–	89	–	–	–	–	–	–	–	–	Magnetic Heaven
1986	"Right Between the Eyes"	60	68	18	–	28	24	1	–	43	42	Magnetic Heaven
1986	"Shadows of Love"	151	–	–	–	–	–	–	–	–	–	Magnetic Heaven
1986	"Systematic"	155	–	–	–	–	–	–	–	–	–	Magnetic Heaven
1987	"Bridge to Your Heart"	12	17	3	19	11	6	8	9	–	–	American English
1987	"American English"	–	–	29	–	–	96	–	–	–	–	American English
1988	"In Some Other World"	–	–	37	–	–	–	–	–	–	–	American English
1989	"Wherever You Are"	–	–	–	–	–	–	–	–	–	–	A Hundred Thousand in Fresh Notes
1989	"Anchors Aweigh"	95	–	–	–	–	–	–	–	–	–	A Hundred Thousand in Fresh Notes
2022	"Ready to Go Home"	–	–	–	–	–	–	–	–	–	–	Non-album single
"—" denotes items that did not chart or were not released in that territory.

=== Music videos ===
Year	Song	Director(s)	Album
1984	"Don't Break My Heart"		Common Knowledge.com
1985	"Ball and Chain"		Magnetic Heaven
1986	"Shadows of Love"	John Scarlett-Davis	Magnetic Heaven
1986	"Shadows of Love (North American version)"	Storm Thorgerson	Magnetic Heaven
1986	"Right Between the Eyes"		Magnetic Heaven
1987	"Bridge to Your Heart"	Storm Thorgerson	American English
1987	"American English"	Storm Thorgerson	American English
1987	"In Some Other World"	Storm Thorgerson	American English
1989	"Wherever You Are"		A Hundred Thousand in Fresh Notes
1989	"Anchors Aweigh"		A Hundred Thousand in Fresh Notes

=== Other Gold-Gouldman collaborations ===
Year	Release	Artist	Notes
1981	Ten Out of 10	10cc	Andrew Gold co-wrote, co-produced and performed on "The Power of Love", "We've Heard It All Before" and "Run Away"
1992	...Meanwhile	10cc	Andrew Gold plays 12 string guitar on "Charity Begins at Home"
1995	Mirror Mirror	10cc	Andrew Gold performs lead vocal on "Ready To Go Home" and backing vocals on "Grow Old With Me"
1996	...Since 1951	Andrew Gold	Most of the tracks on the album co-written and performed with Graham Gouldman. "Ready To Go Home" is taken from 10cc album Mirror Mirror, "Can Anybody See You" and "Baby's Got A Gun" would later appear on The Wax Files, while "First Time In Love" would later appear on Common Knowledge.com. "The King of Showbiz" is Andrew Gold's solo recording of the Common Knowledge.com track
1997	Thank You for Being a Friend: The Best of Andrew Gold	Andrew Gold	The album includes "Can Anybody See You" and "The King of Showbiz" from ...Since 1951
1997	Greetings From Planet Love	The Fraternal Order of the All	The song "Love Tonight" is written by Andrew Gold, Graham Gouldman and Mike Botts. The album also includes "The King of Showbiz" that would later appear on Common Knowledge.com
1998	Leftovers	Andrew Gold	1989 song "Tail Lights" written by Andrew Gold and Graham Gouldman
2000	And Another Thing...	Graham Gouldman	Andrew Gold performed on and co-produced six songs with Gouldman
2011	The Essential Collection	Andrew Gold	Andrew Gold's best of compilation includes several Wax tracks
