= Let Me Change Your Mind Tonight =

1991 song by Johnny Hates Jazz

Single by Johnny Hates Jazz

from the album Tall Stories
- Released: 20 May 1991
- Length: 4:45 (album/single version); 6:41 (extended version)
- Label: Virgin
- Songwriter(s): Phil Thornalley
- Producer(s): Calvin Hayes; Mike Nocito

Johnny Hates Jazz singles chronology
"Turn the Tide" (1989)	"Let Me Change Your Mind Tonight" (1991)	"The Last to Know" (1991)

"Let Me Change Your Mind Tonight" is a song by British pop band Johnny Hates Jazz, released in 1991 as the lead single from their second studio album, Tall Stories (1991). The song was written by Phil Thornalley and was produced by Calvin Hayes and Mike Nocito. It reached number 101 in the UK Singles Chart.

== Background ==
"Let Me Change Your Mind Tonight" features strings by the New World Symphonia, with Del Newman as the arranger and conductor. Johnny Hates Jazz member and co-producer Calvin Hayes ensured the band held a couple of pre-production meetings with Newman before he began working on the arrangement. This was because of the band's previous experience with Anne Dudley, who did the string arrangement for the 1988 track "Turn Back the Clock", which the band felt suffered from the "huge mistake" of not holding such a meeting beforehand. Speaking of Newman's involvement in the song, Hayes recalled to Will Harris in 2021, "He turned to Phil [Thornalley] and said, 'I want to know exactly what the chords are', so Phil showed him every single note and chord. By the time we did the string arrangement, there were no notes or chords that clashed. We'd done our homework!"

== Release ==
The single was originally scheduled for release on 13 May, but this was pushed back to 20 May. The song failed to reach the top 100 of the UK Singles Chart and reached its peak of number 101 on 15 June 1991. It gained enough airplay to reach number 50 in the Music Week Playlist Chart on 8 June 1991.

== Critical reception ==
Upon its release as a single, Marcus Hodge of the Cambridge Evening News commented, "It opens with the word 'baby' but then develops into a far more interesting record than we had any right to expect. There's a bit of George Michael in here, and even a hint of Talk Talk. They lost their singer some time ago but don't appear to be suffering too much." Andrew Hirst of the Huddersfield Daily Examiner wrote, "The wonderful wailing guitar work makes the worn-out aura seem even more world-weary. Genteel and refined, compact and, yes, bijou." Barbara Ellen of New Musical Express was critical of the song, describing it as "nasty, cheap, coffee table pop". She added, "The video will doubtless feature some gormless model charging £1000 an hour to look 'tragic' and cross and uncross her legs in a dimly lit winebar. Idiots, I'd have done it myself for a tenner."

== Track listing ==
7-inch single (UK and Europe)

1. "Let Me Change Your Mind Tonight" – 4:45
2. "Breaking Point" – 3:04

12-inch and CD single (UK)

1. "Let Me Change Your Mind Tonight" – 4:45
2. "Let Me Change Your Mind Tonight" (Orchestral Version) – 4:57
3. "Let Me Change Your Mind Tonight" (Extended Mix) – 6:41
4. "Breaking Point" – 3:02

CD single (Japan)

1. "Let Me Change Your Mind Tonight" – 4:45
2. "Your Mistake" – 3:22

== Personnel ==
Credits are adapted from the UK CD single liner notes and the Tall Stories booklet.

Johnny Hates Jazz

- Phil Thornalley – vocals, instruments
- Calvin Hayes – instruments
- Mike Nocito – instruments

Additional musicians

- Del Newman – New World Symphonia arranger and conductor
- Dave Gregory – guitar solo
- Dan Duncan – big horn
- Frank Ricotti – percussion
- Tony Beard – additional drums
- Colin Campsie – backing vocals

Production

- Calvin Hayes – production
- Mike Nocito – production, engineer
- Tom Lord-Alge – mixing

Other

- Larry Vigon – art direction, design
- Brian Jackson – design
- Chris Callis – photography

== Charts ==
Chart (1991)	Peak position
UK Singles Chart (OCC)	101
UK Playlist Chart (Music Week)	50
