= Bridge to Your Heart =

Single by Wax

from the album American English
- B-side: "Ready or Not", "Heaven in Her Bed"
- Released: 6 July 1987
- Recorded: 1987, Westside Studios, London, England
- Length: 4:14 (Album version); 3:51 (Single version)
- Label: RCA
- Songwriters: Andrew Gold; Graham Gouldman
- Producer: Christopher Neil

Wax singles chronology
| "Systematic" (1986) | "Bridge to Your Heart" (1987) | "American English" (1987) |

"Bridge to Your Heart" is a song by Wax from their second studio album American English (1987). In many European countries the song was released under the title "Building a Bridge to Your Heart".

The song became the group's most popular single in their home country of the United Kingdom, reaching No. 12 on the UK Singles Chart and reaching the top ten in other European countries such as the Netherlands and Sweden.

== Background ==
In March 1987, band members Andrew Gold and Graham Gouldman started writing and recording songs for the follow-up to their debut album Magnetic Heaven, American English. One of these songs was "Bridge to Your Heart".

The song was later released as the album's second single on 6 July 1987, on RCA Records. The song then debuted at No. 98 on the UK Singles Chart, and slowly rose to its peak position of No. 12 on the chart, where it remained for three consecutive weeks. The song instantly became their breakout hit, and the American English album became the duo's first and only album to chart in the UK, peaking at No. 59 on the UK Albums Chart. The song became their only UK top 40 hit, making them a one-hit wonder there. Their only song after the release of "Bridge to Your Heart" to chart was "Anchors Aweigh", which barely scraped the top 100 of the UK Singles Chart, peaking at No. 95 on the chart.

In Europe, the song was also a hit reaching top 10 and top 20 in a number of countries.

== Music and lyrics ==
The song opens with Gold counting from one to two, backed by drums; he then restarts the count, counting to four – "hold it… NOW!". A majority of the song features Gold singing, backed by drums and pop-influenced music. The song also features a horn section, opened by Gold shouting "Horn!". The section starts after the song's final verse.

The song's lyrics talk about a failed relationship between a man and a woman, the man trying to rekindle the relationship by promising the woman a new beginning, and that he will treat her better ("I can't give you a written guarantee I won't make you sad / but I'll be on my best behavior"). He then states on the chorus that he is "building a bridge" to the woman's heart.

== Music video ==
The song's music video, directed by Storm Thorgerson, was released in 1987 and featured stop-motion animation by Klasky-Csupo, Inc., with shifting backgrounds and some scenes with more traditional animation. These scenes follow the context of the song's lyrics.

The video received some MTV airplay, including "Weird Al" Yankovic's AL-TV special.

== Formats and track listings ==
German 7" single

- A "Bridge to Your Heart" – 3:51
- B "Ready or Not" – 3:31

German maxi-12" single

- A "Bridge to Your Heart" (The Unabridged version) – 5:15
- B1 "Bridge to Your Heart" (7" version) – 3:51
- B2 "Ready or Not" – 3:31

UK/Australian 7" single

- A "Bridge to Your Heart" – 3:51
- B "Heaven in Her Bed" – 5:36

UK/U.S. 12" single

- A "Bridge to Your Heart" (The Unabridged version) – 5:15
- B1 "Bridge to Your Heart" (7" version) – 3:51
- B2 "Heaven in Her Bed" – 5:36

== Charts ==
=== Weekly charts ===
Weekly chart performance for "Bridge to Your Heart"
| Chart (1987) | Peak position |
|---|---|
| Australia (Kent Music Report) | 17 |
| Belgium (Ultratop 50 Flanders) | 3 |
| Ireland (IRMA) | 11 |
| Italy Airplay (Music & Media) | 15 |
| Netherlands (Dutch Top 40) | 8 |
| Netherlands (Single Top 100) | 6 |
| Spain (AFYVE) | 8 |
| Sweden (Sverigetopplistan) | 9 |
| UK Singles (OCC) | 12 |
| West Germany (GfK) | 19 |

=== Year-end charts ===
1987 year-end chart performance for "Bridge to Your Heart"
| Chart (1987) | Position |
|---|---|
| Belgium (Ultratop Flanders) | 50 |
| European Top 100 Singles (Music & Media) | 99 |
| Netherlands (Dutch Top 40) | 69 |
| Netherlands (Single Top 100) | 81 |
