= A Hundred Thousand in Fresh Notes =

Studio album by Wax
- Released: 22 September 1989
- Length: 43:44
- Label: RCA
- Producer: Peter Collins; Andrew Gold; Graham Gouldman

Wax chronology
American English (1987)	A Hundred Thousand in Fresh Notes (1989)	The Wax Files (1997)

Singles from A Hundred Thousand in Fresh Notes
- 1. "Wherever You Are" Released: 1989; 2. "Anchors Aweigh" Released: 1989

A Hundred Thousand in Fresh Notes is the third studio album by the English New Wave duo Wax, released by RCA Records on 22 September 1989. The majority of the album was produced by Peter Collins, with four tracks produced by members Andrew Gold and Graham Gouldman.

"Wherever You Are" was released as the album's lead single, however it failed to generate commercial success in the UK or Europe. The second and final single, "Anchors Aweigh", reached No. 95 in the UK and remained in the charts for two weeks. After the album failed to achieve major commercial success, Gold and Gouldman disbanded and moved on to separate projects.

== Critical reception ==
Upon its release, Paul Lewis of the South Wales Evening Post praised A Hundred Thousand in Fresh Notes as "excellent" and continued, "The songs are accessible with enough quirky touches to lift them out of the ordinary soft rock bracket. There's little chance of this being a monster seller and that is a pity." The Newcastle Evening Chronicle commented, "Gouldman and Gold team up again and get off to a fine start with the melodic yet rhythmic 'Anchors Aweigh'. Obviously a lot of thought and care has gone into this album, from composing to performing and producing." Paul Taylor of the Manchester Evening News noted the album "is not an unqualified success", but added "there is plenty of high quality songwriting and fresh instrumentation outweighing the less-inspired tracks".

== Track listing ==
All tracks are written by Andrew Gold and Graham Gouldman.

No.	Title	Length
1.	"Anchors Aweigh"	6:10
2.	"Wherever You Are"	3:25
3.	"Railroad to Heaven"	3:42
4.	"He Said She Said"	3:56
5.	"Spell on You"	4:07
6.	"Don't Play That Song"	4:23
7.	"Pictures of Paris"	3:22
8.	"Maybe"	4:23
9.	"Madeleine"	5:12
10.	"Credit Where Credit's Due"	5:14

== Personnel ==
Wax

- Andrew Gold – vocals, backing vocals, keyboards, guitars, drum programming, percussion
- Graham Gouldman – vocals, backing vocals, guitars, bass guitar, percussion

Additional personnel

- Gary Maughn – Fairlight synthesizer
- Dave Stewart – additional keyboards
- Stephen Ferrara – drums
- Scott Handy – saxophones
- Judd Lander – bagpipes
- John Cameron – string arrangements and conductor
- Miriam Stockley – backing vocals
- Chris Thompson – backing vocals
- Mr. Magic – rap

Production

- Peter Collins – producer (1–3, 5, 6, 9, 10)
- Andrew Gold – producer (4, 7, 8, 10), engineer (4, 7, 8, 10)
- Graham Gouldman – producer (4, 7, 8, 10)
- Ian Taylor – engineer (1–3, 5, 6, 9, 10), mixing

Album artwork

- Anthony May – photography
- Storm Thorgerson and Colin Chambers – cover
- Nexus – artwork, graphics
