= Steven Lisberger =

American film director (born 1951)

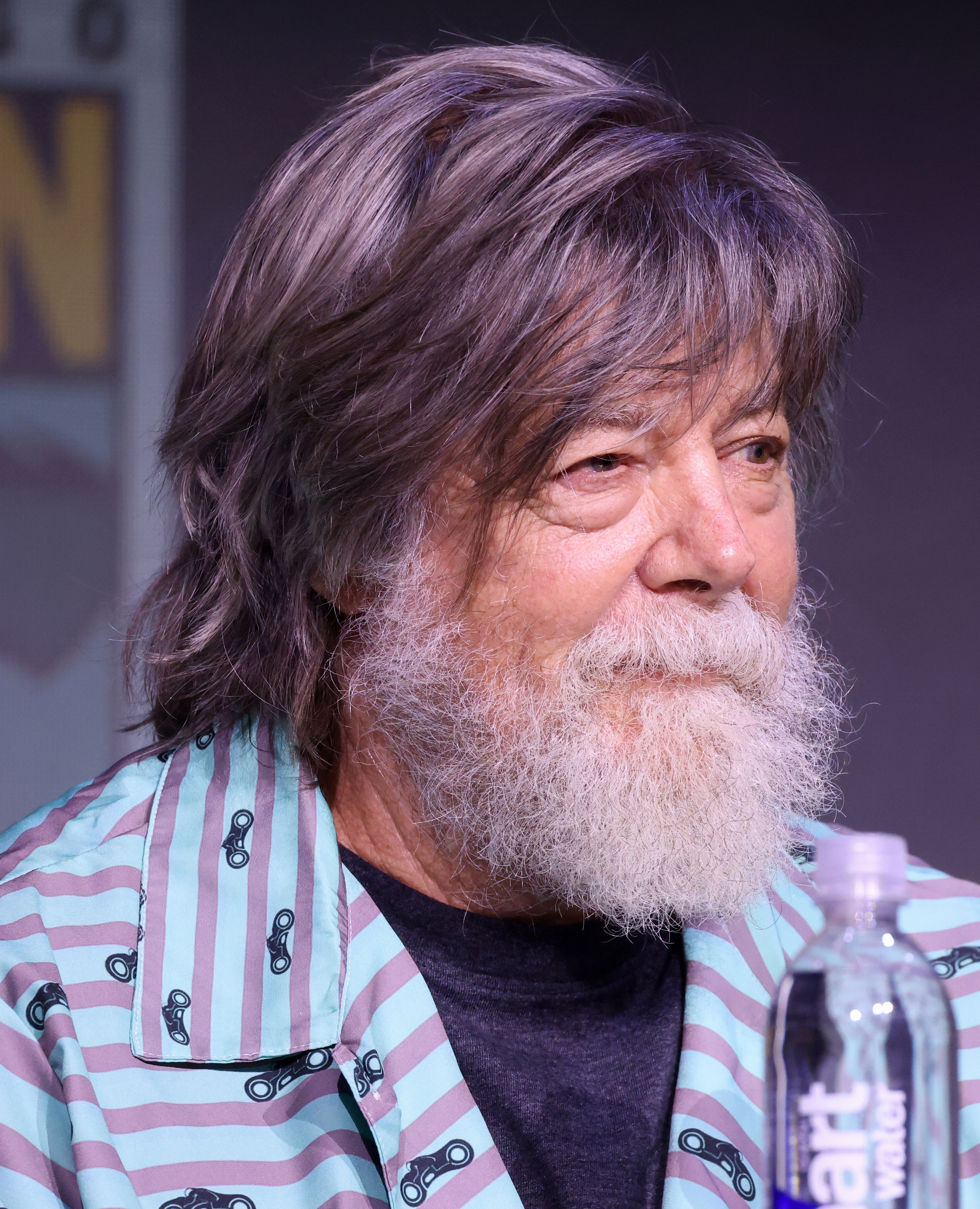
- Lisberger in 2025
- Born: Steven M. Lisberger; April 24, 1951 (age 75); New York City, U.S.
- Education: Tufts University
- Occupations: Film director; producer; screenwriter; animator
- Years active: 1973–present
- Known for: Tron
- Spouse: Peggy Flook Lisberger
- Children: 1

Steven M. Lisberger (born April 24, 1951) is an American film director, producer, and screenwriter. He is best known for writing and directing the 1982 film Tron.

== Early life and education ==
Lisberger was born in 1951 in New York City and grew up in Hazleton, Pennsylvania. Of his ethnic background, he said that his father was Jewish while his mother's side was half Jewish and half Christian, both native German. Lisberger attended The Hill School in Pottstown and Tufts University. In 1973, he graduated from the School of the Museum of Fine Arts in Boston, Massachusetts.

== Career ==
While attending Tufts University, Lisberger and five associates formed Lisberger Studios. Their first project of note was Cosmic Cartoon, which earned a Student Academy Award nomination in 1973. It was also featured in the nationally-released anthology film, Fantastic Animation Festival, in 1977. Through his company, Lisberger Studios, Lisberger directed the production of commercials, title sequences, and feature segments for programs, such as Make a Wish and Rebop.

In 1978, after moving to Venice, California, Lisberger and his business partner Donald Kushner conceived and produced a 90-minute animated film, Animalympics, for NBC's coverage of the 1980 Olympics. They then turned their creative efforts to the development of Tron at The Walt Disney Company. It was released in 1982 and has since become a cult classic.

His film Hot Pursuit (1987) features one of Ben Stiller's first speaking roles.

In 1989, Lisberger directed Slipstream, though the film was a critical and commercial failure.

Lisberger spent most of the 1990s and 2000s writing screenplays, with several being optioned by various studios.

In 2007, it was announced that he and Jessica Chobot were working together on a film project called Soul Code, though it was never produced.

Lisberger tried for years to convince Disney to develop a Tron sequel, though the project frequently languished in development hell. Eventually, Disney green-lit Tron: Legacy, and it was released in 2010 with Lisberger serving as producer. The film was a success at the box office and was followed by a television series, Tron: Uprising and another sequel Tron: Ares.

== Personal life ==
Lisberger and his wife, Peggy, live in Santa Monica, California and have a son named Carl.

== Filmography ==
Year	Film	Director	Writer	Producer	Notes
1973	Cosmic Cartoon	Yes	No	No	Short film; also animator & art director
1980	Animalympics	Yes	Yes	Yes	Television film
1982	Tron	Yes	Yes	No	Also visual effects concepts
1987	Hot Pursuit	Yes	Yes	No	
1989	Slipstream	Yes	No	No	
2010	Tron: Legacy	No	No	Yes	Cameo as "Shaddix"
2025	Tron: Ares	No	No	Yes	Creative consultant
