= American English (album) =

Studio album by Wax
- Released: 31 August 1987
- Recorded: March 2, 1987 – May 20, 1987
- Studios: Westside Studios, London
- Genre: New wave
- Length: 41:35
- Label: RCA
- Producers: Christopher Neil; Andrew Gold; Graham Gouldman

Wax chronology
Magnetic Heaven (1986)	American English (1987)	A Hundred Thousand in Fresh Notes (1989)

Singles from American English
- 1. "Bridge to Your Heart" Released: 6 July 1987; 2. "American English" Released: October 1987; 3. "In Some Other World" Released: January 1988

Professional ratings
Review scores
Source	Rating
AllMusic	3/5 stars

American English is the second studio album by the English new wave duo Wax released on August 31, 1987 on RCA records. It includes their biggest hit single "Bridge to Your Heart".

The album cover, designed by Storm Thorgerson, shows objects that all refer to wax.

The album was reissued in Japan in 2011 with bonus tracks including "People All Over The World", B-side to "In Some Other World" single, and singles' mixes of the songs "American English" and "Bridge to Your Heart".

== Track listing ==
All songs were written by Andrew Gold and Graham Gouldman, except where noted.

=== Side one ===
1. "American English" – 4:25
2. "In Some Other World" – 4:45
3. "Ready or Not" – 3:31
4. "Call It Destiny" – 4:03
5. "Bridge to Your Heart" – 4:14

=== Side two ===
6. "Share the Glory" (Paul Bliss, Phil Palmer) – 3:56
7. "Alright Tonight" – 4:14
8. "The Promise" – 3:14
9. "Heaven in Her Bed" – 4:36
10. "Bug in the Machine" – 4:21

Bonus tracks on the 2011 Japanese reissue
No.	Title	Length
11.	"People All Over The World"	3:39
12.	"American English" (The Concorde Mix)	5:12
13.	"Bridge to Your Heart" (The Unabridged Version)	5:16
14.	"Bridge to Your Heart" (7" Version)	3:51

== Personnel ==
Wax

- Andrew Gold – lead vocals, backing vocals, keyboards, funk guitar (10), drums, drum programming
- Graham Gouldman – guitars (1–5, 7–9), bass guitar, backing vocals, lead vocals (10)

Additional musicians and vocals

- Adrian Lee – keyboards
- Wix – keyboards
- Paul Bliss – keyboards (6), programming (6)
- Phil Palmer – guitars (6)
- Peter Van Hooke – drums, drum programming
- Paul Carrack – backing vocals
- Christopher Neil – backing vocals
- Tessa Niles – backing vocals
- Jackie Rawe – backing vocals
- Ruth Cuenca – voice (1)
- Raissa Danilou – voice (1)
- Kyoko Ono – voice (1)
- Lorna Wright – voice (1)

=== Production ===
- Christopher Neil – producer (1–3, 5–8)
- Andrew Gold – producer (4, 9, 10)
- Graham Gouldman – producer (4, 9, 10)
- Simon Hurrell – engineer, recording (1–9), mixing (1–3, 5–10)
- Peter Jones – assistant engineer (1–9), recording (10)
- Phil Bodger – mixing (4)
- Ian Cooper – mastering at The Town House (London, UK)
- Storm Thorgerson – design
- Christopher Bissell – photography

== Charts ==
Chart (1987)	Peak position
Australia (Kent Music Report)	86
United Kingdom (Official Charts Company)	59
