= Standard American English =

Standard American English is the standardized dialect of English in the United States, including the systems of spelling, pronunciation, grammar, vocabulary, and other linguistic features that are, within the US, the most prestigious and institutionally promoted for public and formal usage. Despite its powerful status, it is not officially regulated by any uniform authority or institution. Its features are the default ones already largely described under American English. Otherwise, narrower types of information are available at:

- General American English, a continuum of socially prestigious accents naturally spoken across the United States
- Standard English, the basic concept of any national norm for formal English, which differs between English-speaking countries
- Comparison of American and British English
  - Comparison of General American and Received Pronunciation, a comparison of General American English with Received Pronunciation, the British standard accent

== See also ==
- American English (disambiguation)
