= Animalympics =

1980 animated film by Steven Lisberger

- Promotional release poster
- Written by: Steven Lisberger; Michael Fremer
- Story by: Steven Lisberger; Roger Allers; John Norton
- Directed by: Steven Lisberger
- Starring: Billy Crystal; Michael Fremer; Gilda Radner; Harry Shearer
- Music by: Graham Gouldman
- Country of origin: United States
- Original language: English

Production
- Producers: Donald Kushner; Steven Lisberger
- Cinematography: Ted Bemiller; Paul Nevitt (animation camera)
- Editor: Matt Cope
- Running time: 78 minutes
- Production company: Lisberger Studios

Original release
- Network: NBC
- Release: February 1, 1980

Animalympics is a 1980 American animated sports comedy television film directed by Steven Lisberger and produced by Lisberger Studios for the NBC network. Originally commissioned as two separate specials, it spoofs the Summer and Winter Olympic Games and features the voices of Billy Crystal, Gilda Radner, Harry Shearer, and Michael Fremer. The film spoofs real-life sports personalities like Howard Cosell and Muhammad Ali.

== Plot ==
The film is a series of vignettes presented as the broadcast of the first animal Olympic Games through the fictional ZOO television network. The Games combine summer and winter Olympic events.

The event is covered mostly by Barbara Warblers, a songbird, and "anchorturtle" Henry Hummel. The 100-meter dash is covered in the style of a drag race by Jackie Fuelit.

Unlike the real Olympics, continents are represented rather than countries. The continents featured are North America, South America, Eurasia, Europe, Africa, Australia, and Asia. Eurasia represents the USSR, whereas Europe represents Western and Central Europe.

The only mention of areas other than continents includes the New York City Rats soccer team; Dean Wilson, who is from California; a Central American marathon runner named Pepé Repanosa; an Acapulco cliff diver named Primo Cabeza; marathon runner Terry Hornsby, who is from Boulder, Colorado; René Fromage, who is from France; and Kurt Wüfner, who appears at the downhill event just before a Scandinavian is awarded a gold medal.

Although many of the segments stand alone, there are some recurring events and important characters. The largest such story is the coverage of the marathon, where competitors René Fromage and Kit Mambo are the favorites to win. Both are determined to win—Fromage having devoted his entire life to the marathon, Mambo determined to make a name for herself—but they find themselves surprised when their minds wander to thoughts of mutual admiration and then to love, culminating in the pair holding hands for the rest of the race and crossing the finish line together. Another important story is that of Kurt Wüffner, a West German dachshund skier, and his disappearance to Dogra-la during a mountain climbing expedition shortly after the slalom event.

There are even cases of players attempting to cheat in the games, only to end up losing disgracefully while their honorable opponents take home the victory. At the start of the soccer game, the New York Ratpack, led by Rizzo the "Whiz", uses underhanded maneuvers to win, yet they are overpowered by the European All-Stars Hounds, led by Rolf Shmecker, whose experience brings home the win. During the ice hockey game, the Eurasian Longhorns have rigged the entire ice rink with explosives in order to take out their rivals, the North American Kodiaks, led by their coach Bear McLane. Yet in spite of the foul play, the Kodiaks still emerge victorious due to the efforts of their star player Guy Lafluke. In the swimming event for the 100-meter freestyle lap, the largest swimmer, Ono Nono, tries to eliminate the entire competition with a tidal wave to ensure no one else wins; yet he is defeated by the young surfer Dean Wilson, who uses his own tail as a surfboard to ride the wave to the finish line first. In the boxing match, vicious brawler Janos Brushteckel is known for overpowering his opponents with excessive force, yet aspiring boxer Joey Gongolong manages to outmaneuver him with clever strategy and an out-boxer style to wear him down and ultimately deliver the winning blow. In the fencing match, Count Maurice Boar-Deaux uses underhanded tactics to take out all other fencers, only to be outdone by The Contessa, whose graceful moves and style help her adapt to the Count's actions and ultimately overcome him, avenging all the players he wronged.

A minor story features an alligator named Bolt Jenkins. He was "born as a handbag" and told that he would never walk again. A song during his story reveals that he lives in the sewers. After seeing a frog named Boris Amphibiensky break the world record for the high jump, Jenkins has an epiphany and becomes determined to break the record. Jenkins goes on to set world records in the high jump, the pole vault, and later the 100-meter dash. Jenkins sacrifices his gold medal in the 100-meter dash to an African competitor named Kip Ngongo and favorite whom Jenkins considers to be his superior.

== Voice cast ==
- Gilda Radner as Barbra Warblers / Brenda Springer / Cora Lee Perrier / Tatyana Tushenko / Dorrie Turnell / The Contessa
- Billy Crystal as Rugs Turkell / Joey Gongolong / Art Antica / Bruce Kwakimoto
- Harry Shearer as Keen Hacksaw / Mayor of Animalympic Island / Burnt Woody / Mark Spritz
- Michael Fremer as Henry Hummel / René Fromage / Kit Mambo / Bolt Jenkins / Kurt Wuffner / Dean Wilson / Mele / Count Maurice Boar-Deaux / Jackie Fuelit / Bear McLane / Guy Lafluke / Bjorn Freeborg / Mamo Ululu

== Production ==
Animalympics was commissioned by NBC in 1978, as the network intended Lisberger Studios to create it as two hour-long specials to be paired alongside coverage of both the 1980 Winter Olympics and the Summer Olympics then held in Moscow. But after the Soviet Union had invaded and gained control of Afghanistan, then United States President Jimmy Carter decided to boycott the Moscow Summer Olympics. Because of this, NBC canceled its Olympic coverage and the Animalympics Summer special.

However, from its conception, producer Donald Kushner and director Steven Lisberger intended the project as a feature-length theatrical release (complete with Dolby surround sound via 35mm film), even though the Winter Olympics special was already considered for an Academy Award for Best Animated Short Film nomination.

Among those who worked on Animalympics were art director/animator Roger Allers, animation director Bill Kroyer, and animator Brad Bird. Allers, who animated Kit Mambo, the lion star of Animalympics, went on to direct The Lion King. Kroyer later wrote and directed the Oscar-nominated short Technological Threat and the animated feature FernGully: The Last Rainforest. Bird went on to work as story editor on the animated sitcom The Simpsons, and later achieved even greater success writing and directing the animated films The Iron Giant, The Incredibles, and Ratatouille. Director Lisberger went on to conceive, co-write, and direct the science fiction cult classic Tron, which some of the Animalympics crew were involved in. Its soundtrack supervisor was Michael Fremer, who was involved in Animalympics as a co-writer, voice artist, dialogue/music track editor, and sound mix supervisor.

== Soundtrack ==
Animalympics

Soundtrack album by Graham Gouldman
- Released: March 1980
- Recorded: 1979
- Studios: Strawberry Studios North and South; A&M Studio, Los Angeles
- Genre: Rock
- Length: 35:00
- Labels: UK version – Mercury; US version – A&M
- Producer: Graham Gouldman

Graham Gouldman chronology
The Graham Gouldman Thing (1968)	Animalympics (1980)	And Another Thing... (2000)

Singles from Animalympics
- 1. "Love's Not For Me (Rene's Song)" Released: 1980

Professional ratings
Review scores
Source	Rating
Allmusic	4/5 stars

A&M Records in the US and Mercury Records in Europe released an Animalympics soundtrack album, which has long been out of print. The music on this soundtrack was written and produced by Graham Gouldman, who performed the tracks himself along with other members of 10cc (Gouldman is the bassist and co-founder of the band). The soundtrack was recorded primarily in Strawberry Studios North and South, used extensively by 10cc, as well as in Los Angeles.

Pieces of classical music play in the film. "The Hut on Hen's Legs (Baba Yaga)" from Pictures at an Exhibition by Modest Mussorgsky plays during Tatyana Tushenko's floor exercises. "March to the Scaffold" from Symphonie fantastique by Hector Berlioz plays during the couple's figure skating. The third movement from Symphony No. 4 by Johannes Brahms plays during Dorie Turnell's skating performance.

=== Track listing ===
All tracks are written by Graham Gouldman.

Side 1

No.	Title	Length
1.	"Go for It"	3:38
2.	"Underwater Fantasy"	3:19
3.	"Away from It All"	2:36
4.	"Born to Lose"	4:08
5.	"Kit Mambo"	4:19

Side 2

No.	Title	Length
1.	"Z.O.O."	3:15
2.	"Love's Not for Me (Rene's Song)"	2:47
3.	"With You I Can Run Forever"	4:07
4.	"Bionic Boar"	3:07
5.	"We've Made It to the Top"	3:44

=== Personnel ===
Per vinyl liner notes

- Graham Gouldman – lead and backing vocals, bass, guitar, percussion, arrangements, production
- Rick Fenn – guitar, backing vocals
- Duncan Mackay – keyboards, clavinet, backing vocals
- Paul Burgess – drums, percussion
- Stuart Tosh – backing vocals
- Mike Timony – accordion on "Love's Not For Me (Rene's Song)"
- Jimmie Haskell – orchestral arrangements
- Sid Sharp – concertmaster
- Joel Sill – coordinator
- Alan Barson, Chris Nagle, Larry Forkner – engineering
- Tony Spath – engineering, mix-down engineer
- Melvyn Abrahams – mastering and half speed mastering at Strawberry Mastering and Sheffield Lab Matrix

== Release ==
Despite the 1980 NBC premiere being cancelled midway, Lisberger Studios prepared a theatrical version for overseas markets by editing together the Summer and Winter Olympic Games sections, alongside other additions and changes to increase its run-time for theatrical exhibition. Though Animalympics never found a theatrical distributor in the U.S., Telepictures did acquire US home video and pay-TV distribution rights to it shortly after the NBC cancellation. It eventually received a full US TV premiere on NBC affiliate WPTZ on July 4, 1982. Animalympics also aired in its theatrical form on HBO and Showtime nationwide in summer 1984, as well as intermittently during the early-to-mid-1990s on The Disney Channel.

=== Availability ===
The film was released on VHS by Warner Bros., Family Home Entertainment, and UAV Corporation.

On April 3, 2018, Hen's Tooth Video released the first-ever region 1 DVD. In 2019, Austrian label Winkler Film released a remastered DVD alongside the first-ever Blu-ray release worldwide.

== See also ==
- Animal Olympic Games
- Laff-A-Lympics
- Sports Cartoons
- Olympic Games
- Wide World of Sports
- Furry fandom
- 1980 in television
