= Floating in Heaven =

Single by Brian May and Graham Gouldman
- Genre: Rock, pop
- Length: 3:30
- Label: Duck Productions Ltd, Universal International Music B.V.
- Songwriter: Graham Gouldman
- Producers: Brian May; Graham Gouldman; Graeme Pleeth

Brian May singles chronology
"Panic Attack 2021 (It's Gonna Be Alright)" (2021)	"Floating in Heaven" (2022)

Graham Gouldman singles chronology
"Dancing Days" (2000)	"Floating in Heaven" (2022)

Music video
- "Floating in Heaven" on YouTube

"Floating in Heaven" is a song by astrophysicist and guitarist Brian May (of Queen), and singer and bassist Graham Gouldman (of 10cc). It was released on 12 July 2022 on digital streaming platforms including a music video on the official Queen YouTube channel, the full song and instrumental released under the Graham Gouldman - Topic channel.

== Background ==
The song was created in response to photos from the James Webb Space Telescope being released, showing the first photos of space that it sent to Earth. May, who is also an astrophysicist, said "There is nothing more exciting in a world of exploration than going to a place about which you know nothing,” and “The sky's the limit for what we could find out." The song's release coincided with the showing of the first images of space being sent to Earth.

A short video of May and Gouldman had been released in March 2022 on May's social media, teasing a collaboration.

The song was written by Gouldman, with May contributing guitars and vocals. The song features descriptive and astronomical lyrics, the first verse features It’s time for me to say goodbye and search for past is new / Our future lies above the clouds, above the sky so blue / I’ve never seen the moon so white / I’ve never seen the sun so bright / I’m floating in heaven / I’m so high.”

== Music video ==
The music video was directed by Jake McBride and features a sample of a NASA countdown while showing archival footage of various space rockets being launched before the music starts, the rest of the music video features videos of the James Webb Space Telescope with videos and pictures of May and Gouldman being overlaid on the video.

An alternative video was uploaded by the Space Telescope Science Institute channel. The video consists of pictures taken by the telescope.

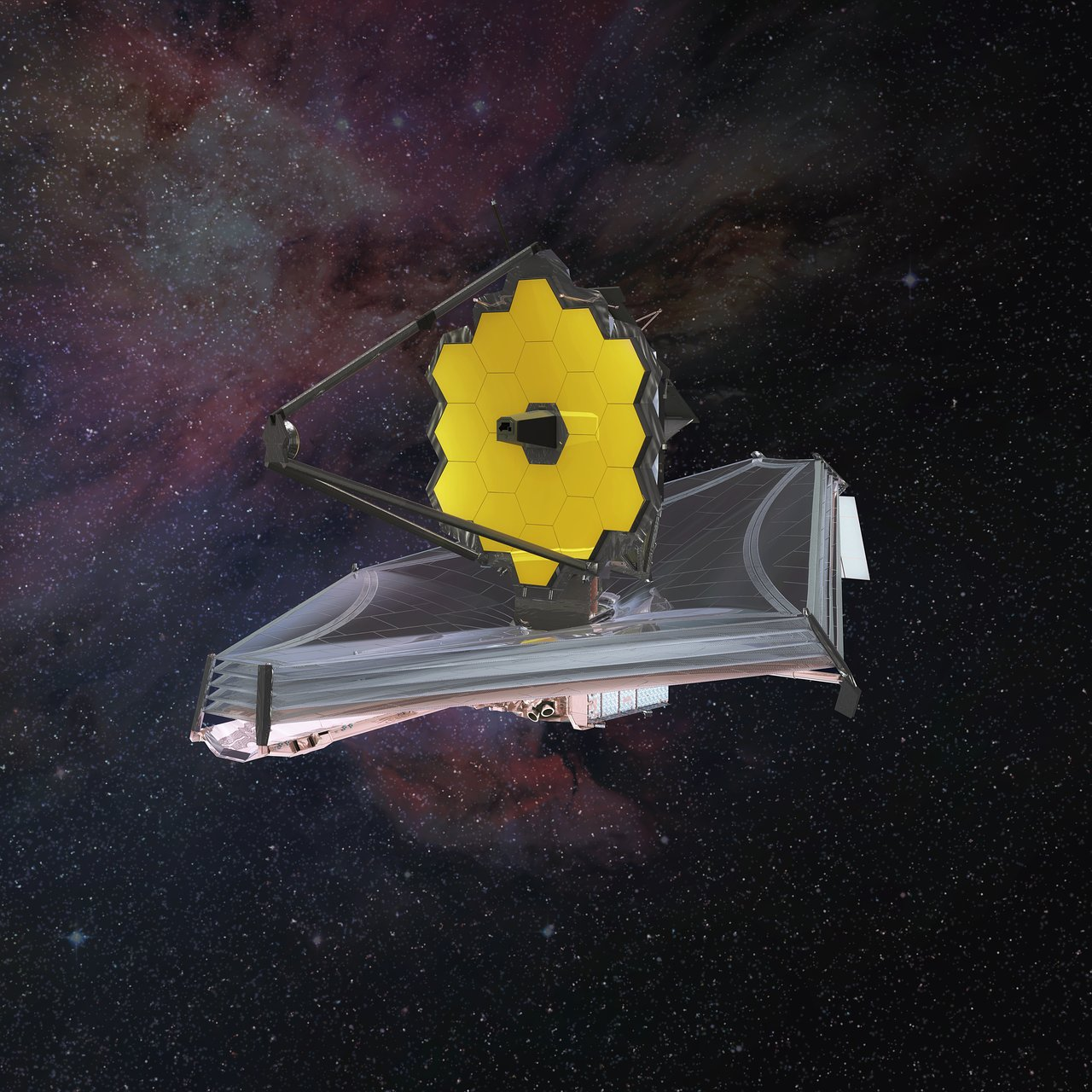
James Webb Space Telescope in operation

== Personnel ==
Per YouTube descriptions

=== Song credits ===
- Graham Gouldman – lead and backing vocals, bass guitar, acoustic guitar, slide guitar, drum programming, guitar, Gizmotron, production
- Brian May – guitar, backing vocals, production
- Graeme Pleeth – Hammond organ, piano, synthesizer, production, engineer
- Justin Shirley-Smith – mixer
- Kris Fredriksson – additional engineer
- Bob Ludwig – mastering engineer

=== Music video credits ===
- Jake McBride – director
- Simon Lupton – producer
- Duck Productions Ltd. – production company
