= Mirror Mirror (10cc album) =

Studio album by 10cc
- Released: June 1995
- Length: 58:01 (14-track version); 65:22 (15-track version)
- Label: Avex UK
- Producer: Eric Stewart, Graham Gouldman, Adrian Lee, Rod Gammons

10cc chronology
Alive (1992)	Mirror Mirror (1995)	The Very Best of 10cc (1997)

Singles from Mirror Mirror
- 1. "I'm Not in Love (Acoustic Session '95)" Released: 6 March 1995; 2. "Ready to Go Home" Released: 15 May 1995

Mirror Mirror is the eleventh and final studio album by British rock band 10cc, released in 1995 and re-titled I'm Not in Love for the 1996 re-release. The album was their first not to be released on a major UK label, this time working with Japanese label Avex following the poor performance of their previous album ...Meanwhile in the UK and its relative success in Japan.

== Background and recording ==
Mirror Mirror was again recorded with just two of 10cc's core band members, Graham Gouldman and Eric Stewart; however, the album was more a combination of two solo albums than a conventional 10cc production. Gouldman and Stewart played and produced together only one new track – an acoustic reworking of their 1975 hit "I'm Not in Love", one of only three songs on the album that bore a Stewart-Gouldman joint songwriting credit. The other two Stewart-Gouldman songs were both taken from the sessions of the previous 10cc album ...Meanwhile. Songs written by Stewart were recorded in France, while Gouldman's songs were recorded in London. Both Stewart and Gouldman co-produced their songs with Adrian Lee who also performed on most of the album's tracks.

Gouldman admitted the album was "almost like two-halves of an album", largely a result of the fact that he and Stewart began recording in separate countries:

Vaguely, we intended starting off these tracks and then bring them together, finish them together, which a lot of people do, but it never happened. We got so into what we were doing, we wanted to keep it pure. I don’t like to say we hoodwinked the people, but you could say it’s not quite what it appears to be, and anyone with any sense, who reads the credits, could see that.

— Graham Gouldman

Mirror Mirror included appearances by 10cc's longtime collaborators Rick Fenn on one track and Andrew Gold on two tracks, touring members Steve Pigott and Gary Wallis on one track, and notable guest performances by Paul McCartney on two tracks: "Yvonne's the One" co-written by McCartney and Stewart in February 1985 during the sessions for McCartney's Press to Play album, but remade and completed on this album, and "Code of Silence" which also started as a collaboration between McCartney and Stewart. The album also included the new reworked mix of the original recording of "I'm Not in Love" from 1975.

One of Gouldman's songs, "Ready to Go Home", was written after the death of his father, Hyme Gouldman, in 1991. Gouldman later re-recorded the song for his 2000 album, And Another Thing..., when he observed in the liner notes:

It reflects my feelings at the time. I suppose I was trying to put a positive slant on his passing, remembering all the things we had done together and his artistic legacy to me. The last verse of the song best reflects my feelings on this. This song has been recorded by many artists and remains one of my favourites. Very emotional.

— Graham Gouldman

Following the tour to support Mirror Mirror, Stewart announced his departure from 10cc. Gouldman, however, has continued with his own lineup for 10cc as a touring band.

== Release ==
The album was released in several different variations. The original UK (Avex) and European (ZYX, Germany) release featured 14 tracks. For the US edition, five tracks were excluded: "Yvonne's the One", "Margo Wants the Mustard", "Blue Bird", "Now You're Gone" and the 1995 acoustic rendition of "I'm Not in Love", but another song was added - "I'm Not in Love (Rework of Art Mix)". The Japanese version of the album features 15 tracks, bringing together all of the songs from European and US editions.

Eric Stewart later included his songs from Mirror Mirror on his 2017 best of compilation Anthology.

== Reception ==
Professional ratings
Review scores
Source	Rating
AllMusic	3/5 stars

Mirror Mirror charted only in Japan giving the band their highest chart position there, however the new acoustic version of "I'm Not in Love", released as a single charted at No. 29, giving the band their highest position since "Dreadlock Holiday" in 1978.

AllMusic panned the album, commenting that the claim of "I'm Not in Love" being reworked is dubious, since the track has no noticeable differences from the original recording. They summarized the rest of the album with "songs flashing the group's trademark lyrical wit generally tend toward musical vaporware, while those revealing an occasional glimmer of instrumental creativity go nowhere fast on the songwriting."

== Track listing ==
No.	Title	Writer(s)	Producer(s)	Length
1.	"Yvonne's the One"	Paul McCartney, Eric Stewart	Eric Stewart, Adrian Lee	4:26
2.	"Code of Silence"	McCartney, Stewart	Stewart, Lee	5:39
3.	"Blue Bird"	Graham Gouldman	Graham Gouldman, Lee	4:04
4.	"Age of Consent"	Stewart	Stewart, Lee	5:24
5.	"Take This Woman"	Stewart, Gouldman	Gouldman, Lee	3:51
6.	"The Monkey and the Onion"	Gouldman, Tim Rice	Gouldman, Lee	3:17
7.	"Everything Is Not Enough"	Stewart	Stewart, Lee	4:28
8.	"Ready to Go Home"	Andrew Gold, Gouldman	Gouldman, Lee	4:37
9.	"Grow Old with Me"	Gouldman	Gouldman, Lee	3:22
10.	"Margo Wants the Mustard"	Stewart	Stewart, Lee	3:54
11.	"Peace in Our Time"	Gouldman, Steve Pigott	Gouldman, Lee, Rod Gammons	4:03
12.	"Why Did I Break Your Heart?"	Stewart, Gouldman	Stewart, Lee	5:18
13.	"Now You're Gone"	Gouldman	Gouldman, Lee	3:01
14.	"I'm Not in Love (Acoustic Session '95)"	Stewart, Gouldman	10cc, Gammons	3:30

=== US edition ===
No.	Title	Writer(s)	Producer(s)	Length
1.	"I'm Not in Love (Rework of Art Mix)"	Eric Stewart, Graham Gouldman	10cc	5:51
2.	"Peace in Our Time"	Gouldman, Steve Pigott	Graham Gouldman, Adrian Lee, Rod Gammons	4:03
3.	"Ready to Go Home"	Andrew Gold, Gouldman	Gouldman, Lee	4:37
4.	"The Monkey and the Onion"	Gouldman, Tim Rice	Gouldman, Lee	3:17
5.	"Why Did I Break Your Heart?"	Stewart, Gouldman	Eric Stewart, Lee	5:18
6.	"Code of Silence"	Stewart	Stewart, Lee	5:39
7.	"Take This Woman"	Stewart, Gouldman	Gouldman, Lee	3:51
8.	"Grow Old with Me"	Gouldman	Gouldman, Lee	3:22
9.	"Age of Consent"	Stewart	Stewart, Lee	5:24
10.	"Everything Is Not Enough"	Stewart	Stewart, Lee	4:28

=== Japanese edition ===
No.	Title	Writer(s)	Producer(s)	Length
1.	"I'm Not in Love (Rework of Art Mix)"	Eric Stewart, Graham Gouldman	10cc	5:51
2.	"Peace in Our Time"	Gouldman, Steve Pigott	Graham Gouldman, Adrian Lee, Rod Gammons	4:03
3.	"Code of Silence"	Stewart	Eric Stewart, Lee	5:39
4.	"Take This Woman"	Stewart, Gouldman	Gouldman, Lee	3:51
5.	"Yvonne's the One"	Paul McCartney, Stewart	Stewart, Lee	4:26
6.	"The Monkey and the Onion"	Gouldman, Tim Rice	Gouldman, Lee	3:17
7.	"Margo Wants the Mustard"	Stewart	Stewart, Lee	3:54
8.	"Ready to Go Home"	Andrew Gold, Gouldman	Gouldman, Lee	4:37
9.	"Everything Is Not Enough"	Stewart	Stewart, Lee	4:28
10.	"Blue Bird"	Gouldman	Gouldman, Lee	4:04
11.	"Age of Consent"	Stewart	Stewart, Lee	5:24
12.	"Grow Old with Me"	Gouldman	Gouldman, Lee	3:22
13.	"Why Did I Break Your Heart?"	Stewart, Gouldman	Stewart, Lee	5:18
14.	"Now You're Gone"	Gouldman	Gouldman, Lee	3:01
15.	"I'm Not in Love (Acoustic Session '95)"	Stewart, Gouldman	10cc, Gammons	3:30

== Personnel ==
10cc

- Eric Stewart — lead and backing vocals, lead guitar, keyboards, percussion
- Graham Gouldman — lead and backing vocals, guitars, bass guitar, percussion, mandolin
- Rick Fenn — lead guitar on "Peace in Our Time"
- Steve Pigott — keyboard, drum programming on "Peace in Our Time"
- Gary Wallis — drums, percussion on "Peace in Our Time"
- Kevin Godley — bass drum, musical box, backing vocals on "I'm Not in Love (Rework of Art Mix)"
- Lol Creme — grand piano, backing vocals on "I'm Not in Love (Rework of Art Mix)"

with

- Adrian Lee — bass, programming, arrangements, keyboard, backing vocals, brass section, percussion, accordion, vibes, acoustic guitar (except "I'm Not in Love" and "Now You're Gone")
- Paul McCartney — rhythm guitar ("Yvonne's the One"), strings, electric piano, frogs, crickets, percussion ("Code of Silence")
- Andrew Gold — lead vocal ("Ready to Go Home"), backing vocals ("Grow Old with Me")
- Ian Thomas — drums on "Ready to Go Home"
- Gary Barnacle — saxophone on "Why Did I Break Your Heart?"
- Peter Thoms — trombone on "Take This Woman"
- Lise Aferiat and Nicola Burton – violin on "The Monkey and the Onion" and "Grow Old with Me"
- Chris Goldscheider – viola on "The Monkey and the Onion" and "Grow Old with Me"
- Patrick Jones – cello on "The Monkey and the Onion" and "Grow Old with Me"
- Andrew Hines – cello on "The Monkey and the Onion"

== Weekly charts ==
Chart (1995)	Peak position
Oricon Albums Chart	46
