= Tall Stories (album) =

Studio album by Johnny Hates Jazz
- Released: June 1991
- Recorded: 1990–1991
- Studios: RAK, London, UK
- Length: 36:32
- Label: Virgin
- Producers: Calvin Hayes, Mike Nocito

Johnny Hates Jazz chronology
Turn Back the Clock (1988)	Tall Stories (1991)	The Very Best of Johnny Hates Jazz (1993)

Tall Stories is the second studio album by Johnny Hates Jazz, released by Virgin in 1991. The follow-up to 1988's Turn Back the Clock, Tall Stories features producer and songwriter Phil Thornalley as lead singer, following the departure of the band's frontman Clark Datchler. On the eve of the album's release, Thornalley and keyboardist Calvin Hayes were involved in a serious car crash that depleted the band's momentum. The album failed to chart, and the band subsequently folded.

The album featured contributions from XTC's Dave Gregory (lead guitar) and Kasim Sulton of Utopia (backing vocals).

== Background ==
Following the commercial success of Turn Back the Clock, lead singer Clark Datchler left Johnny Hates Jazz at the end of 1988 to embark on a solo career. Despite the departure, which was described by Nocito in 1992 as "[not] a particularly amicable split", Nocito and Hayes decided to continue. In 1989, after a period of auditioning a number of singers, Nocito and Hayes invited Phil Thornalley to take the role. All three had known each other since childhood and originally recorded "Me and My Foolish Heart" together before Thornalley chose to leave and produce Robbie Nevil instead. Thornalley told the Newcastle Evening Chronicle in 1989: "I dumped them right in it the first time and I was not expecting to be invited back, but it's like coming full circle. I'm doing something I should have been doing five years ago." In addition to his vocal abilities, Thornalley was able to fulfill Datchler's role as the band's songwriter.

The new line-up's first release was the non-album single "Turn the Tide", which reached No. 84 in the UK in late 1989. While the Tall Stories album was completed and delivered to Virgin Records in October 1990, "internal politics" delayed the album's release until the following year. During mid-1991, Thornalley and Hayes were involved in a serious car crash which in turn delayed the album's release to 1992. Tall Stories was a commercial failure, including its two singles, "Let Me Change Your Mind Tonight" and "The Last to Know", although the latter did reach No. 57 in Germany during 1991.

In 2011, Thornalley recalled how both Tall Stories and his 1989 solo album Swamp made him realise "my passion was for writing songs [and] not performing them". Speaking to Paul Sinclair of Super Deluxe Edition in 2013, Nocito said of the album: "We were sort of obligated. Even to me now, it's not a Johnny Hates Jazz album. It didn't feel like one. I can't really listen to that record, some things happened from a personal point of view, my mother died right at that time, Calvin had that car crash. So I don't want to go there." He added to Magic Music Magazine in 2017: "There was a very bad car accident. Terrible timing but luckily nobody died. After the car accident no one wanted to continue."

== Critical reception ==
Upon its release, Music & Media commented, "This new album introduces new lead singer Phil Thornalley. Yet the sound hasn't changed much since the days of their European hit single, 'Shattered Dreams'. The first single, 'Let Me Change Your Mind Tonight', sets the tone for the rest of this melodic, soft pop album." Phil Bryant of The Crawley News wrote, "Tall Stories has a number of influences, bits of Paul McCartney here, George Michael there and Tears for Fears in abundance. The ten songs are all pleasant enough, but maybe there's the rub! Pleasant it may be, but it isn't original."

Jon Selzer of Melody Maker was critical of the album, believing it to have little "approaching a tune" and be full of "clichés and self-pity" instead, particularly the lyrics which he felt concentrated on the theme of "he's split up with his girlfriend and wants her back". He commented, "Tall Stories sounds like the kind of music they play to illustrate trysts in soap operas, where a lovelorn character wanders by a lake to get a free blow-dry, or the touching moment in those human-dramas-on-Bogdon-Pier the Beeb are so good at. Drama, as far as Johnny Hates Jazz are concerned, is a term to be used ironically." Andrew Collins of NME was also negative, noting that Thornalley's replacement of Datchler "[does] not make a sod of difference to the Johnnys' spiritless, dreary coffee table adultsoulpopdirge". He added, "Tall Stories skips like a Triceratops with flat-feet through Lennon rip-off balladry and tortured George Michael ache. It occasionally commits crimes against brass too."

In a review of the 1993 compilation The Very Best of Johnny Hates Jazz, Michael Sutton of AllMusic commented of the three tracks included from Tall Stories, "Sounding no different than anything on Turn Back the Clock, these tracks prove that Johnny Hates Jazz didn't lose their knack for soulful, danceable hooks after Datchler's departure."

== Track listing ==
All tracks are written by Phil Thornalley except where noted.

No.	Title	Writer(s)	Length
1.	"Let Me Change Your Mind Tonight"		4:45
2.	"Money Changes Hands"	Thornalley, Jim Williams	3:35
3.	"Your Mistake"	Thornalley, Mike Nocito	3:19
4.	"The Last to Know"		3:37
5.	"Closer"	Thornalley, Chris Murrell	3:49
6.	"Between You and Me"	Thornalley, Tommy Faragher, Lotti Golden	3:12
7.	"Shelter from the Storm"		2:10
8.	"Fools Gold"	Thornalley, Calvin Hayes, Nocito	4:49
9.	"Keep Me in Mind"		3:38
10.	"Now She's Gone"	Thornalley, Hayes, Nocito, Clyde Lieberman	3:53

== Personnel ==
Johnny Hates Jazz

- Phil Thornalley – vocals, instruments
- Calvin Hayes – instruments, backing vocals
- Mike Nocito – instruments, backing vocals

Additional musicians

- Chris Newman – Fairlight programming
- Ole Paulsen – additional keyboards (2, 4)
- Tommy Faragher – additional keyboards (3, 6, 8, 9), original track and programming (6), bass (6), backing vocals (6, 8, 9)
- Lotti Golden – original track and programming (6)
- Dave Gregory – guitar solo (1)
- Phil Palmer – acoustic guitar (2), guitar solo (8)
- Jim Williams – electric guitar (2, 3)
- Graham Brierton – bass guitar (2, 5)
- Tony Beard – additional drums (1), drums (6)
- Frank Ricotti – percussion (1, 3, 4, 5, 8, 9), vibraphone solo (4)
- Dan Duncan – big horn (1)
- The Kick Horns - horns (4)
  - Simon Clarke – saxophones
  - Tim Sanders – saxophones
  - Roddy Lorimer – trumpet
  - Paul Spong – trumpet
- Molly Duncan – tenor saxophone (10)
- New World Symphonia – strings (1, 3)
- Del Newman – string arrangements and conductor (1, 3)
- Colin Campsie – backing vocals (1)
- Kasim Sulton – backing vocals (2)
- Tom Bailey – Eastern interlude (2)
- Kim Wilde – backing vocals (3, 5)

== Production ==
- Calvin Hayes – producer, mixing (3–10)
- Mike Nocito – producer, engineer, mixing (3, 4, 5, 8, 9, 10)
- Tom Lord-Alge – mixing (1, 2)
- Roy Spong – mixing (3, 4, 5, 8, 9, 10)
- Phil Thornalley – mixing (6, 7)
- Michael Ade – additional engineer
- Henry Binns – additional engineer
- Eddie Briquet – additional engineer
- El Davinci – additional engineer
- Chris Dickie – additional engineer
- Dan Duncan – additional engineer
- Steve Gallagher – additional engineer
- Mike Jarret – additional engineer
- Richard Norris – additional engineer
- Ren Swan – additional engineer
- Mystery Tim – additional engineer
- Daren Walder – additional engineer
- Helen Woodward – additional engineer
- Larry Vigon – art direction, design
- Brian Jackson – design
- Chris Callis – photography
- Cyndy Warlow – stylist

Studios

- Recorded at RAK Studios (London, UK).
- Additional engineering at RAK Studios, Abbey Road Studios, Master Rock Studios, Olympic Studios and The Swamp Studios (London, UK); The Manor Studio (Oxford, UK); Madfly Studio (New York City, New York, USA); Encore Studios (Burbank, California, USA).
- Mixed at RAK Studios and Encore Studios.
