= Magnetic Heaven =

Studio album by Wax
- Released: 20 March 1986
- Recorded: 1985
- Studios: RAK Studios (London); Strawberry Studios (Stockport)
- Genres: New wave; pop rock
- Length: 45:38
- Label: RCA
- Producers: Phil Thornalley; Andrew Gold; Graham Gouldman

Wax chronology
Magnetic Heaven (1986)	American English (1987)

Singles from Magnetic Heaven
- 1. "Ball and Chain" Released: 1985; 2. "Right Between the Eyes" Released: 26 February 1986; 3. "Shadows of Love" Released: 1986; 4. "Systematic" Released: 1986

Professional ratings
Review scores
Source	Rating
AllMusic	4/5 stars

Magnetic Heaven is the debut studio album by the English new wave duo Wax, released on 20 March 1986 on RCA Records.

The album cover, painted by Jason Bradley, shows the band members.

The European and the American editions of the album featured different versions of the song "Ball and Chain" with the latter edition having the longer one.

The album was reissued in Japan in 2011 with bonus tracks including "The Lie", B-side to "Ball and Chain" single, and singles' mixes of the songs "Ball and Chain" and "Hear No Evil".

== Uses in media ==
In 1988, American pop singer Nicolette Larson covered the band's song "Shadows of Love", which served as the title of the album on which it appeared.

== Track listing ==
All tracks are written by Andrew Gold and Graham Gouldman.

Side one
No.	Title	Length
1.	"Right Between the Eyes"	4:08
2.	"Hear No Evil"	4:17
3.	"Shadows of Love"	4:39
4.	"Marie Claire"	4:09
5.	"Ball and Chain"	5:49

Side two
No.	Title	Length
6.	"Systematic"	4:18
7.	"Breakout"	4:19
8.	"Only a Visitor"	5:00
9.	"Rise Up"	5:29
10.	"Magnetic Heaven"	3:30
Total length:		45:38

Bonus tracks on the 2011 Japanese reissue
No.	Title	Length
11.	"The Lie"	3:46
12.	"Ball and Chain" (Chainsaw Mix)	8:37
13.	"Ball and Chain" (Ballroom Mix)	8:55
14.	"Hear No Evil" (Full Length Mix)	7:12
Total length:		74:08

== Personnel ==
=== Wax ===
- Andrew Gold – vocals, backing vocals, keyboards, guitars, drums, programming
- Graham Gouldman – vocals, backing vocals, guitars, bass guitar

=== Technical ===
- Produced and engineered by Phil Thornalley (1, 3, 5–7, 9, 10); Andrew Gold and Graham Gouldman (2, 4, 8)
- Mixed by Phil Thornalley (2, 4)
- Assistant engineers – Matt Barry and Chris Dickie
- Additional engineers – Richard Scott and Chris Nagle
- Painting – Jason Bradley
- Photography – Simon Fowler
- Design and art direction – The Leisure Process
