= Michael Fremer =

American journalist

Michael Alan Fremer
- Born: 1947 (age 78–79); New York City, New York, U.S.
- Education: Cornell University
- Occupation: journalist
- Writing career
- Period: 1970s–present

Michael Alan Fremer (born 22nd March 1947) is an American music journalist, YouTuber, and voice actor from New York City, known for writing about audiophile equipment and vinyl. He is the editor of The Tracking Angle and Senior Editor at The Absolute Sound. Due to his influence within the audiophile community, he has been called the "Pied Piper of vinyl" and the "dean of audiophile writing."

== Career ==
Fremer graduated from Cornell University with a degree in Industrial and Labor Relations in 1968 and worked as a radio DJ in Boston and New Jersey in the 1970s, when he began to write about music and audio equipment. In the early 1980s, he became a well known critic of the audio quality of compact discs and was a vocal proponent of analogue source material and vinyl records.

In 1986, Fremer was hired by The Absolute Sound as pop music editor. During the 1990s, he ran his own magazine called The Tracking Angle. For many years, he was the editor of Analog Planet and contributing editor at Stereophile and Sound&Vision. In 2017, he served as an expert witness in the Quincy Jones vs the Estate of Michael Jackson trial.

In 2022 he left Analog Planet and returned to The Absolute Sound and, along with Nick Despotopoulos and David L’Heureux, revived The Tracking Angle as a website. In 2022, he had a well-publicized spat with YouTuber and record store owner Michael Esposito regarding Mobile Fidelity's use of digital source material.

In addition to his audiophile journalism, Michael Alan Fremer has done voice acting on films such as Animalympics and Felix the Cat: The Movie and supervised the soundtrack to Disney's Tron.
