= The Graham Gouldman Thing =

Studio album by Graham Gouldman
- Released: 1968
- Recorded: Olympic Sound Studios, London
- Genre: Pop
- Length: 29:19
- Label: RCA Victor, BMG
- Producer: Graham Gouldman, Peter Noone, John Paul Jones

Graham Gouldman chronology
The Graham Gouldman Thing (1968)	Animalympics (1980)

Singles from Magnetic Heaven
- 1. "The Impossible Years" b/w "No Milk Today" Released: 1968; 2. "Upstairs, Downstairs" b/w "Chestnut" Released: 1968; 3. "Pamela, Pamela" b/w "For Your Love" Released: 1968

Professional ratings
Review scores
Source	Rating
Allmusic	4.5/5 stars

The Graham Gouldman Thing is the debut album by singer-songwriter Graham Gouldman, later a founding member of 10cc.

== Overview ==
Prior to the album's recording Graham Gouldman had established himself as a hit singles songwriter, with his most successful songs written for Herman's Hermits, The Yardbirds and The Hollies. On the album Gouldman delivered his own versions of several songs recorded by other musicians ("No Milk Today" by Herman's Hermits, "For Your Love" by The Yardbirds, "Bus Stop" by The Hollies, "Pamela, Pamela" and "The Impossible Years" by Wayne Fontana, "Behind the Door" by St. Louis Union and Cher) as well as his own new compositions.

Gouldman recorded the album at Olympic Studios in London, a studio that would later be extensively used by Led Zeppelin. It was recorded with the assistance of John Paul Jones and Eddie Kramer, and both of whom would also achieve considerable success with Led Zeppelin. The liner notes acknowledge the use of "some fabulous players on the sessions", but do not name them. In sleeve notes for the 2004 CD re-release, Gouldman said his manager Harvey Lisberg suggested he make the album, reworking his hits and recording new songs.

It was also a chance to work on a big project with John Paul Jones, with whom I had worked many times before ... he is a great bass and keyboard player who had an important influence on my playing. The album was supposed to have been co-produced by Peter Noone of Herman's Hermits. The idea being that the artist produces the writer. After the first session he didn't show up again, so John and I ended up producing the album with Eddie Kramer engineering.

— Graham Gouldman

The album was originally released only in the US and Canada with only one single released in the UK. It was made available in the UK for the first time on CD in 1992.

== Track listing ==
All songs composed by Graham Gouldman

Side 1

1. "The Impossible Years" – 2:38
2. "Bus Stop" – 2:24
3. "Behind the Door" – 3:38
4. "Pawnbroker" – 3:02
5. "Who are They" – 2:03
6. "My Father" – 2:47

Side 2

1. "No Milk Today" – 2:15
2. "Upstairs, Downstairs" – 2:17
3. "For Your Love" – 2:34
4. "Pamela, Pamela" – 2:11
5. "Chestnut" – 3:23

== Personnel ==
- Graham Gouldman - vocals, guitar
- John Paul Jones - arrangements
- Clem Cattini - drums

Technical

- Eddie Kramer - engineer
- Bill Inglot - sleeve design
