= ...Meanwhile =

Studio album by 10cc
- Released: 11 May 1992
- Recorded: 1990–1991
- Studios: Bearsville Studios (Woodstock, New York, US); The Hit Factory (New York City); River Sound Studios (New York)); Bill Schnee Studio (Los Angeles); Village Recorders (Los Angeles)
- Genre: Rock
- Length: 51:25
- Label: Polydor
- Producers: Gary Katz; 10cc

10cc chronology
Changing Faces – The Very Best of 10cc and Godley & Creme (1987)	...Meanwhile (1992)	Alive (1993)

Singles from ...Meanwhile
- 1. "Woman in Love" Released: 27 April 1992; 2. "Welcome to Paradise" Released: June 1992

Professional ratings
Review scores
Source	Rating
AllMusic	2.5/5 stars

...Meanwhile is the tenth studio album by the English rock band 10cc, released in 1992. It was the band's first in nine years and marked the brief comeback of the original 10cc members Kevin Godley and Lol Creme.

== Background to recording ==
The background to reuniting the original 10cc members was the success of the 1987 compilation album Changing Faces – The Very Best of 10cc and Godley & Creme:

[Changing Faces] did really well and we all met up again for a lunch. It was to be presented with these fabulous platinum discs. Also round that time our record company made us a very nice offer that we couldn't really refuse, and the fact that we'd all come together again ... we'd sort of resisted working together again and it seemed like a nice thing to do.

— Graham Gouldman

Initially, the project looked promising with Stewart and Gouldman entering the studio with a stockpile of 22 songs:

We had some good songs, so we felt confident that we could still do it. Polydor were pleased with the demos, and so we did the album.

— Graham Gouldman

At the request of the band's label, Polydor, 10cc became involved with the producer Gary Katz who was known for his strong association with Steely Dan, a band with which 10cc was often compared. Their relationship did not work out in terms of production and the use of session musicians for which both Gouldman and Stewart expressed their regrets:

Our record company wanted an American producer, they thought it would help break the American market, and once you start to follow things like that, it's the slippery slope.

We got to the studio, and we had problems with our producer. There wasn't always harmony and I think it created a very one dimensional album. It's also got this darkness to it that I don’t like. Some of the songs, particularly 'Welcome to Paradise', which were brilliant when you hear the demos, didn't translate into the studio.

That and other things combined to make an album which could have been a lot better. There were two things that were wrong for me, I didn't like his idea of bringing in session men; they weren't our players, they weren't our band. Jeff Porcaro was one of the finest drummers in the universe, Freddie Washington the finest bass player. But anyone could have them and I was against this. Gary wanted to use his people, though. He'd always used them, he was very secure with them.

— Graham Gouldman

I love the Meanwhile tracks, but wish we hadn't gone to Gary Katz for production. At the time it was thought by Polyglot that we needed 'new blood' to produce us in a different way. I really enjoyed working with other musicians though, especially Jeff Porcaro on the drums, but in retrospect the production mess we got into leaves a bad taste in my mouth."

— Eric Stewart

The album also did not capture the actual reunion of 10cc: Godley performed lead vocals on "The Stars Didn't Show" and backing vocals on two songs, while Lol Creme supplied backing vocals on six songs. Neither contributed to the recording process of the album.

I wasn't involved with the making of this album at all so I know very little about how it was put together. I was simply asked to sing lead vocal on one song and was flown to New York to record it. The three of us had a lovely reunion breakfast on day one. As I recall all the basic tracks had already been recorded so it was myself, Graham, Eric and producer Gary Katz for two vocal heavy days.

— Kevin Godley

In a 2006 interview, Godley recalled the tension in the studio as he participated in the recording of the album:

I do recall a strange atmosphere in the studio. An intangible awkwardness. Everything sounded 'great', everyone got on 'great', but there was an essential ingredient missing. I also sensed G and E growing apart. Gary Katz was acting as a political as well as creative buffer keeping personalities as well as music on course. I've never actually heard the complete album, although I did enjoy singing "The Stars Didn't Show".

— Kevin Godley

Both Gouldman and Stewart point to the experience of making ...Meanwhile as the beginning of the end of their partnership and 10cc.

The album was recorded across five studios: Bearsville Studios in Woodstock, New York, The Hit Factory, New York, River Sound Studios, New York, Bill Schnee Studio, Los Angeles and Village Recorders, Los Angeles.

Apart from Godley's vocals on "The Stars Didn't Show" and a B-side "Don't" with Gouldman singing lead, all of the album's lead vocals were sung by Stewart. Session musicians Jeff Porcaro and Freddie Washington, who were hired by Katz, were on all tracks on drums and bass guitar respectively. Notable appearances on the album include Andrew Gold, who had collaborated with 10cc and Gouldman in the past, and the blues pianist Dr. John. The album's closing song, "Don't Break the Promises", was co-written by Stewart and Paul McCartney during the sessions for McCartney's sixth solo studio album Press to Play (1986) and was later finished by 10cc for the album.

The album's liner notes included the line: "In memory of Hyme "The Rhyme" Gouldman (1908–1991)". Gouldman, an amateur playwright, was the father of Graham Gouldman.

The cover art was designed by Laurence Dunmore with photography supplied by the Prefecture de Police, Paris.

== Release and reception ==
By the time the album was completed and ready to release there had been changes at Polydor and the new regime did not believe it would be a hit, and spent very little to promote it. In a hospital radio interview in 1993, Gouldman said, "Polydor spent £750,000 to make it and £7,500 to promote it."

The album narrowly missed the Top 75 album chart in the UK (though it made No.66 in the Network chart – an alternative to the official chart). Two singles were released from the album. The first was "Woman in Love" backed with the non-album track "Man with a Mission". The single included the album version of the track rather than the single edit that was issued to radio. It reached No.110 in the UK singles chart selling less than 2,000 copies. The second single, "Welcome to Paradise", a favourite of both Stewart and Gouldman, followed and included the album version of the title track, with two further non-album tracks, "Don't" and "Lost in Love".

Stewart and Gouldman said that there were additional songs planned as singles from ...Meanwhile. Gouldman was interviewed by Mark Wardle on Tarka Radio – a hospital radio station – in 1993 and said that "Don't Break the Promises" would have been the third single, and then "The Stars Didn't Show" and "Wonderland" as fourth and fifth possible singles. Due to the lack of success of the first two singles, these were cancelled. The album was not released in the US.

Later that year, Polydor, which the band had signed a five-album deal with, did not take up its option and dropped the band.

The album was reissued in 2008 with single edits and B-sides as bonus tracks.

== Track listing ==
All tracks are written by Eric Stewart and Graham Gouldman, except where noted.

No.	Title	Length
1.	"Woman in Love"	6:11
2.	"Wonderland"	4:53
3.	"Fill Her Up"	4:08
4.	"Something Special"	3:23
5.	"Welcome to Paradise"	6:14
6.	"The Stars Didn't Show"	4:51
7.	"Green Eyed Monster"	4:44
8.	"Charity Begins at Home"	4:55
9.	"Shine a Light in the Dark"	5:42
10.	"Don't Break the Promises" (Stewart, Paul McCartney, Gouldman)	6:22

=== Bonus tracks on 2008 reissue ===
No.	Title	Length
11.	"Man with a Mission"	5:54
12.	"Don't"	3:49
13.	"Lost in Love"	4:58
14.	"Welcome to Paradise (7" Edit)"	4:05
15.	"Woman in Love (DJ Edit)"	4:21

=== Bonus tracks on 2008 Japanese reissue ===
No.	Title	Length
11.	"Woman in Love (Radio Edit)"	4:01
12.	"Man with a Mission"	5:54
13.	"Welcome to Paradise (7" Edit)"	4:05
14.	"Don't"	3:49
15.	"Lost in Love"	2:08
16.	"Woman in Love (DJ Edit)"	4:21

== Personnel ==
10cc

- Eric Stewart – lead vocals (tracks 1–5, 7–10), slide guitar & strings (track 1), Fender Rhodes electric piano (tracks 1, 2, 5), grand piano
- Graham Gouldman – guitars (tracks 1–10), backing vocals (tracks 1–4, 6–9)
- Lol Creme – backing vocals (tracks 2, 4, 5, 6, 8, 9)
- Kevin Godley – lead vocals (track 6), backing vocals (tracks 5, 8)

Additional personnel

- Jeff Porcaro – drums, percussion
- Freddie Washington – 5-string bass guitar
- Michael Landau – lead guitar (tracks 2, 5, 6, 9, 10), rhythm guitar (track 7)
- David Paich – Hammond B3 organ (tracks 2, 6), melody synth (track 5), string synth (track 10)
- Bashiri Johnson – percussion (tracks 5, 6, 9), tambourine (track 7)
- Andrew Gold – 12 string guitar (track 8)
- Dr. John – grand piano (tracks 3, 4, 8)
- Paul Griffin – synthesizers (track 5)
- Jerry Hey – horn arrangement & trumpet (tracks 5, 7)
- Gary Grant – trumpet (tracks 5, 7)
- Dan Higgins – saxophone (tracks 5, 7)
- Frank Floyd, Fonzi Thornton, Curtis King, Tawatha Agee, Vaneese Thomas – backing vocals (track 5)
- Kim Hutchcroften – saxophone (track 7)
- Bill Reichenbach Jr. – trombone (track 7)
- Gordon Gaines – lead guitar (track 8)
