= Phil Thornalley =

English musician

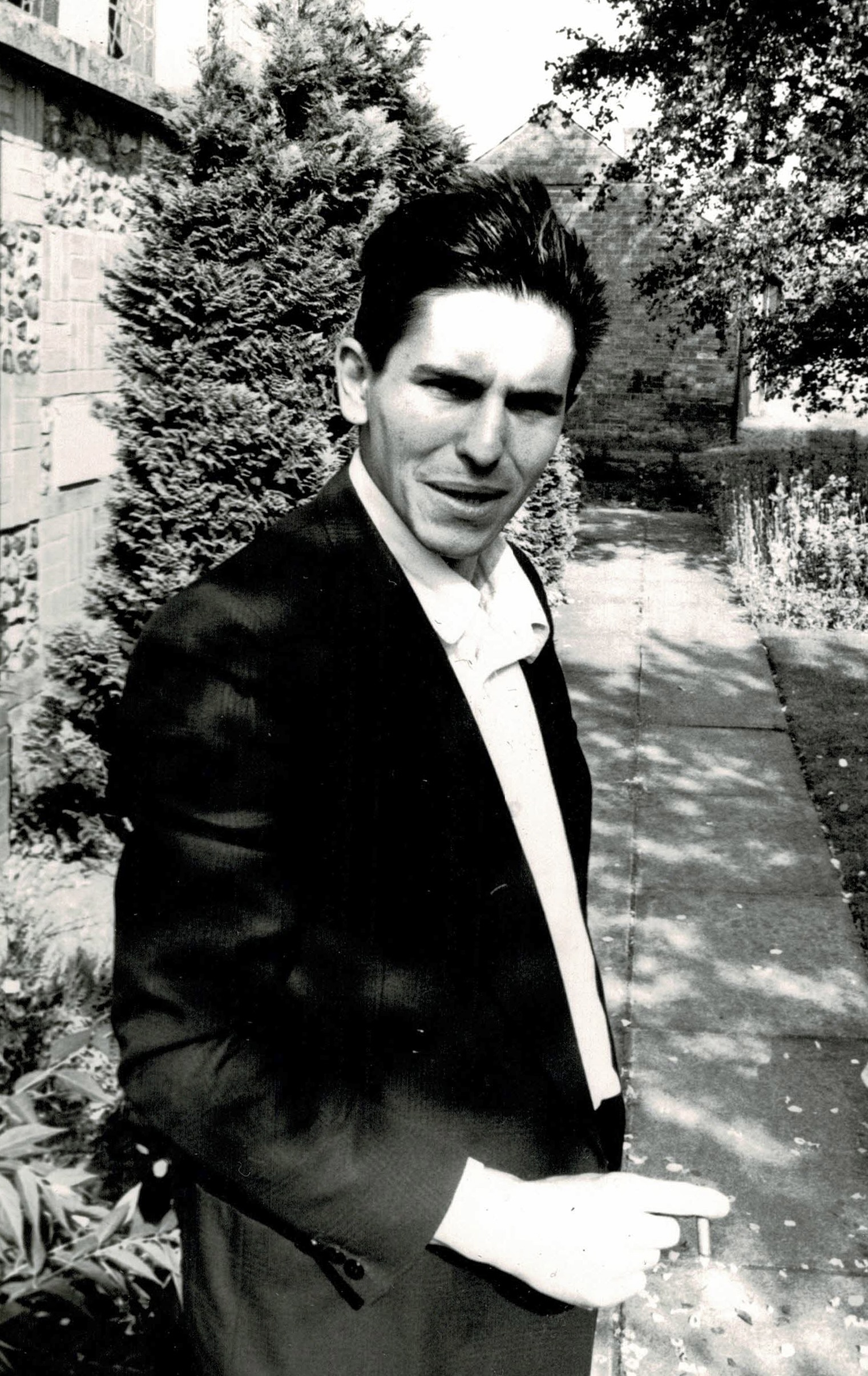
- Thornalley in 1988

Background information
- Born: Phillip Carden Thornalley; 5 January 1960 (age 66)
- Origin: Worlington, Suffolk, England
- Genres: Punk rock; post-punk; new wave; gothic rock; alternative rock; pop rock
- Occupations: Songwriter; producer
- Instruments: Bass guitar; guitar; vocals; drums; piano
- Years active: 1978–present
- Formerly of: The Cure; Johnny Hates Jazz; Bryan Adams

Phillip Carden Thornalley (born 5 January 1960) is an English songwriter, musician, and producer who has worked in the music industry since 1978. He produced the album Pornography (1982) by the Cure and was later the group's bass player. He began releasing his own music in 1988 and briefly joined the band Johnny Hates Jazz. Since then he has worked principally as a songwriter, known for co-writing the song "Torn" (made famous by Natalie Imbruglia) and two UK number one hits for Pixie Lott. Starting in the 2010s he released more solo music under his own name and as Astral Drive.

== Biography ==
Thornalley was born in Worlington, Suffolk. He began working as a recording engineer in 1978 at RAK Studios in London for producers Mickie Most, Steve Lillywhite and Alex Sadkin. His first major role as a producer was for the 1982 album Pornography by the Cure. The following year, he produced the non-album Cure single "The Love Cats" and contributed a distinctive double bass performance on the song. Since the Cure lacked an official bassist at the time, Thornalley joined the band for a short tour of the US and some television appearances, and in 1984 he appeared in videos for songs from the band's album The Top though he did not play on the studio recordings due to being involved with producing and mixing other artists. He also performed on the ensuing tour, and helped the Cure fill its vacant drummer position by recruiting two musicians with whom he had worked in previous studio sessions: temporary touring drummer Vince Ely, followed by Boris Williams who joined the band officially.

After about 18 months with the Cure, Thornalley left the band and resumed working as a songwriter and producer. He was nominated for a Grammy Award for Best Engineered Album, Non-Classical in 1984 for Into the Gap by the Thompson Twins and released his first solo album, Swamp, in 1988. Also in 1988, he joined the pop band Johnny Hates Jazz, which included his friend Mike Nocito, on lead vocals and various instruments, and appeared on their 1991 album Tall Stories. Just before the album was released, Thornalley and bandmate Calvin Hayes were involved in a serious car accident, and their inability to tour caused the album to stall. Thornalley left the band the following year.

Since leaving Johnny Hates Jazz, Thornalley has focused mostly on songwriting and producing for other artists. In 1991, Thornalley co-wrote, with Scott Cutler and Anne Preven, the song "Torn" which later appeared on the 1995 debut album by American alternative rock band Ednaswap. In 1997, Thornalley was hired to produce some songs for Natalie Imbruglia, and her cover of "Torn" became an international hit and is often listed as one of the best pop songs of its era. Thornalley has also written hit songs for BBMak, including "Back Here", and in the late 2000s he wrote two UK number one singles – "Mama Do" and "Boys and Girls" – for Pixie Lott. He has also served as an engineer or producer for a wide variety of artists, including Duran Duran, XTC, Sting, Edwyn Collins, Prefab Sprout, Junior Giscombe, John Martyn, Ash, Kiki Dee, Kim Wilde, Wax, and Cyndi Lauper.

In 2016, Thornalley joined the touring band for Bryan Adams as bassist and wrote songs for the albums Get Up and Shine a Light. In 2018 he launched a solo project called Astral Drive, and released three albums under that name. In 2022 he returned to recording under his own name and released the album Now That I Have Your Attention.

In 2022, Bass Player magazine listed Thornalley's performance on "The Love Cats" by the Cure as the 23rd-best bass line of all time, though it was the first time he had ever played an upright bass. The National Portrait Gallery includes his portrait by photographer Julian Anderson where he is listed as "songwriter".

== Influences ==
Thornalley's influences are Todd Rundgren, the Beatles, and Pink Floyd. Soul singer Reggie Sears has named Thornalley as his favourite singer and credits Thornalley's 1988 release Swamp as the main driving force for wanting to be a singer and musician.

== Personal life ==
Thornalley's son Joe is a producer who releases music under the name Vegyn.

== Selected work ==
=== As writer/producer ===
Singles

- Sean Maguire - "Today's the Day" (No. 27 UK)
- Natalie Imbruglia - "Torn" (No. 2 UK)
- Natalie Imbruglia - "Wishing I Was There" (No. 15 US)
- BBMak - "Back Here" (No. 11 USA / No. 5 UK) (writer only)
- Bryan Adams - "On a Day Like Today" (No. 13 UK)
- Ronan Keating - "The Way You Make Me Feel" (No. 6 UK)
- Pixie Lott - "Mama Do" (No. 1 UK)
- Pixie Lott - "Boys and Girls" (No. 1 UK)
- Pixie Lott - "Cry Me Out" (No. 12 UK)
- Pixie Lott - "Kiss the Stars" (No. 8 UK)
- Hepburn - "I Quit" (No. 8 UK)
- Shannon Noll - "Drive" (No. 1 Australia)
- Daisy Wood-Davies -"Dream Baby Dream" - from the West End musical Dreamboats and Petticoats
- Elkie Brooks - "Forgive and Forget"
- Astral Drive - "Summer Of '76"
- Bardot - "These Days" (No. 19 Australia)

Albums

- Phil Thornalley - Swamp
- Natalie Imbruglia - Left of the Middle (No. 5 UK)
- Bryan Adams - "Shine A Light" (co-writer "The Last Night On Earth" & "Talk To Me")
- Bryan Adams - On a Day Like Today (co-writer "On a Day Like Today" & "How Do You Feel Tonight")
- Bryan Adams - Room Service (co-writer "Not Romeo Not Juliet")
- Bryan Adams - Bare Bones (co-writer "The Way You Make Me Feel")
- Bryan Adams - Get Up (co-writer "That's Rock and Roll")
- Bryan Adams - "Shine A Light" (co-writer "Talk to Me" & co-writer and producer "The Last Night on Earth")
- Melanie C - Reason (writer "Do I","Positively Somewhere' and "Let's Love")
- Melanie C - Northern Star (writer "Ga Ga" and "Be the One")
- Astral Drive - Astral Drive (writer on all songs)
- Astral Drive - Green (writer on all songs)
- Astral Drive - Orange (writer on ten songs)
- Phil Thornalley - Now That I Have Your Attention (writer on all songs)
- Phil Thornalley - Holly Would (writer on all songs)

=== As producer only ===
Singles

- The Cure - "The Hanging Garden"
- Prefab Sprout - "When Love Breaks Down" (No. 25 UK)
- The Cure - "The Love Cats" (No. 5 UK)
- Strawberry Switchblade - "Let Her Go" (No. 59 UK)
- Strawberry Switchblade - "Who Knows What Love Is"
- Holly Vallance - "Naughty Girl" (No. 9 UK)
- Robbie Nevil - "C'est La Vie" (No. 2 US)
- Wax - "Right Between the Eyes" (No. 1 Spain)
- Seona Dancing - "Bitter Heart"

Albums

- The Cure - Pornography (No. 2 UK)
- Frances Ruffelle – Fragile
- Wax - Magnetic Heaven

=== As mixer ===
- Ash - "Girl from Mars"
- Psychedelic Furs - "Pretty in Pink" (original version)
- Sting - "Spread a Little Happiness"
- Duran Duran - "Is There Something I Should Know?" (No. 4 US/ No. 1 UK)
- Thompson Twins - "Hold Me Now"
- Thompson Twins - "Doctor! Doctor!"
- Thompson Twins - "In the Name of Love"
- Thompson Twins - "Lies"
- Cyndi Lauper - "What's Going On"
- The Waterboys - "Fisherman's Blues"
- Gary Breit - "Color Wheel"
- Keith Scott ( as 'The Fontanas' ) - "Surfin' Christmas"

=== Albums as recording engineer and mixer only ===
- The Psychedelic Furs - The Psychedelic Furs
- The Psychedelic Furs - Talk Talk Talk
- John Martyn - Well Kept Secret
- Duran Duran - Seven and the Ragged Tiger
- Thompson Twins - Quick Step & Side Kick
- Thompson Twins - Set
- Thompson Twins - Into the Gap
- Robbie Nevil - Robbie Nevil
- Graham Parker - The Real Macaw

=== Album as assistant engineer ===
- The Jam - All Mod Cons

== Awards and nominations ==
=== Awards ===
- ASCAP 'Song of the Year' 1998 for "Torn" (Natalie Imbruglia)
- ASCAP 'Song of the Year' 2000 for "Back Here" (BBMak)

=== Nominations ===
- Grammy Award 'Best Engineered Pop Album 1984' for Thompson Twins' Into the Gap
