= Graham Gouldman =

English musician (born 1946)

Graham Gouldman MBE
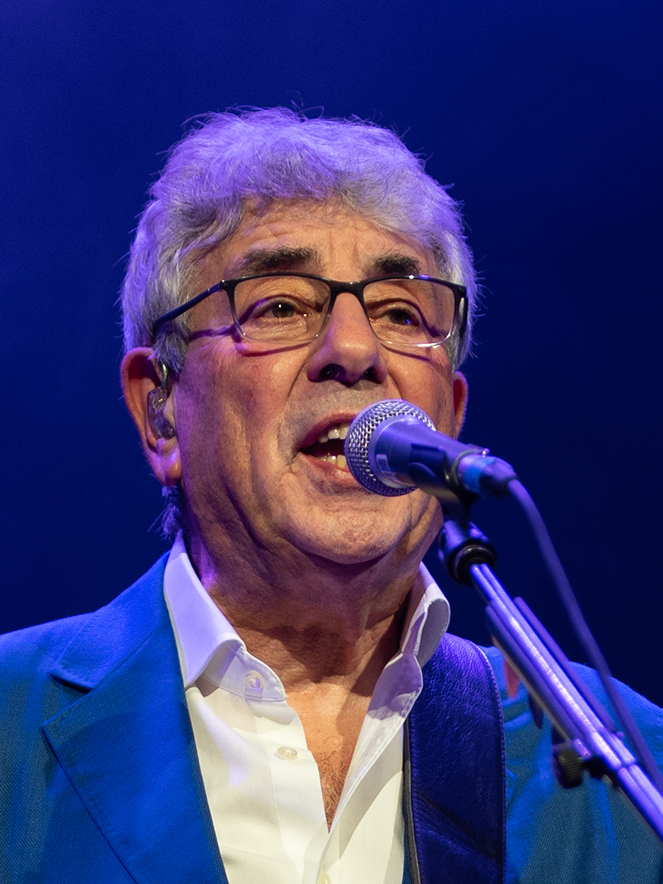
- Gouldman performing in November 2021

Background information
- Born: Graham Keith Gouldman; 10 May 1946 (age 80); Broughton, Salford, Lancashire, England
- Genres: Art rock; soft rock; pop; pop rock
- Occupations: Musician; singer; songwriter
- Instruments: Bass; vocals; guitar
- Years active: 1963–present
- Labels: Mercury; A&M; UK; Fontana; RCA; Decca; Rhino; Lojinx
- Graham Gouldman's voice Recorded February 2014

Graham Keith Gouldman (born 10 May 1946) is an English musician. He is best known as the co-lead singer and bassist of the art rock band 10cc. He has been the band's only constant member since its formation in 1972. Before 10cc, Gouldman worked as a freelance songwriter and penned many hits for major rock and pop groups, including the Yardbirds, the Hollies, Herman's Hermits and Ohio Express.

== Early life and 1960s pop career: 1946–1968 ==
Gouldman was born in Broughton, Salford, Lancashire, into a Jewish family. He received his first guitar at the age of 11. In a 2025 interview he stated that from that point "music was it for (him)", adding that he was not academically gifted, which was recognised by his parents who encouraged his musical activities as "they recognised that songwriting is a gift and I was lucky enough to have it". Although Gouldman's father worked in the clothing industry, he was a keen amateur poet and playwright and advised him whilst he developed his songwriting craft. Gouldman was "barmitzvahed", and attended the synagogue growing up, "and then that gradually faded out, as it does with all Jewish boys." Considering that three of the 10cc songwriters were Jewish, the band jokingly referred to themselves as "three yids and a yok."

Gouldman played in a number of Manchester bands from 1963, including the High Spots, the Crevattes, the Planets and the Whirlwinds, which became a house band at his local Jewish Lads' Brigade. The Whirlwinds – comprising Gouldman (vocals, guitar), Maurice Sperling (vocals/drums), Bernard Basso (bass), Stephen Jacobson (guitar, bongos), Malcolm Wagner and Phil Cohen – secured a recording contract with His Master's Voice, releasing a recording of the Buddy Holly song "Look at Me", backed with "Baby Not Like You", written by future 10cc bandmate Lol Creme, on 22 May 1964.

Gouldman dissolved the Whirlwinds in late 1964, and the following February formed the Mockingbirds with Jacobson, Basso, and a former member of fellow Manchester band the Sabres, Kevin Godley (drums). The Mockingbirds signed with the Columbia label, which rejected Gouldman's first offering as a single – "For Your Love" (later a major hit for the Yardbirds) – and issued two singles, "That's How (It's Gonna Stay)" (February 1965, also issued in the US on ABC-Paramount) and "I Can Feel We're Parting" (May 1965). The band switched to the Immediate label for "You Stole My Love" (October 1965) and Decca for "One By One" (July 1966) and "How to Find a Lover" (October 1966).

The Mockingbirds also began a regular warm-up spot for BBC Television's Top of the Pops, transmitted from Manchester. He recalled: "There was one strange moment when the Yardbirds appeared on the show doing 'For Your Love', which was a song that I'd written. Everyone clamoured around them – and there I was just part of an anonymous group. I felt strange that night, hearing them play my song."

At the same time Gouldman signed a management agreement with Harvey Lisberg, and while working by day in a men's outfitters shop and playing by night with his semi-professional band, he wrote a string of hit songs, many of them million sellers. Between 1965 and 1967 alone, he wrote "For Your Love", "Heart Full of Soul" and "Evil Hearted You" for the Yardbirds; "Look Through Any Window" (with Charles Silverman) and "Bus Stop" for the Hollies; "Listen People", "No Milk Today" and "East West" for Herman's Hermits; "Pamela, Pamela" and "The Impossible Years" for Wayne Fontana; "Behind the Door" for St. Louis Union (later covered by Cher), "Tallyman" for Jeff Beck; and "Going Home", which was a 1967 Australian hit for Normie Rowe.

In 1966–67, Gouldman recorded singles with two other bands, High Society and the Manchester Mob, both of which featured singer Peter Cowap.

In March 1968, he stepped in as a temporary replacement for bassist Bob Lang in the Mindbenders, writing two of the band's final singles, "Schoolgirl" and "Uncle Joe, the Ice Cream Man". The band dissolved eight months later. Gouldman said his time with the band was depressing: "They were sliding down, they were pretty well finished by the time I joined them."

He wrote briefly for publishing house Robbins Music and producer Mickie Most in 1967, and then shifted base to the Kennedy Street Enterprises show business management offices in Manchester. He remained there for four years, recalling: "It was like an office. I used to go in there every morning at 10 o'clock and stay there, working on my songs, until I finished every evening at six o'clock. It was self-discipline and I need that."

A year later he released three singles as a solo artist, before recording his debut solo album, The Graham Gouldman Thing.

== Writer for hire: 1969–1972 ==
Gouldman's reputation as a hit songwriter attracted the attention of bubblegum pop producers Jerry Kasenetz and Jeffry Katz of Super K Productions, who invited him to New York City to write formula bubblegum songs. In what he later called a "creative lowpoint", Gouldman accepted. He recalled: "They wanted me to write and produce for them, so I figured, why not? Nothing else was happening for me at the time. All told I worked for them for three or four periods over the course of a year, just writing and recording, and had no time for anything else. I was totally involved in the whole Kasenetz-Katz thing while I was with them."

He said he was left exhausted and depressed by his dealings with Kasenetz and Katz. "In the mornings I would go into the office and start writing and after I had finished one song in a day, which was very high output for me, they'd come up to me and say: 'Give us another song!' And I'd say 'OK' – because I'm like that. They'd keep up the pressure so that I kept on writing. I was there in their offices working like that for six or eight weeks and when I flew home to Manchester I went straight round to see my doctor. I was feeling sick and could not eat. The doctor told me: 'You are totally over-worked.' I don't think I've ever felt so depressed as I did when I came back from New York."

Gouldman said he was "grasping, sort of prostituting myself" in accepting the Kasenetz-Katz deal, which came with a cash advance. "That was a time when I had lost a little bit of confidence in my writing. I hadn't had any hits for some time. I felt awful. I just didn't seem to be keeping up with what other people were doing. It was very depressing."

One of his first tasks for Super K was writing and singing lead vocals on "Sausalito (Is the Place to Go)", which was released in July 1969 under the name of the Ohio Express.

In December 1969, Gouldman convinced Kasenetz and Katz that the series of throwaway two-minute songs he was writing could all be performed and produced by him and three friends, Godley, Creme and former Mindbender Eric Stewart, at a fraction of the price of hiring outside session musicians. He proposed the quartet work at Strawberry Studios, a Stockport (Cheshire) recording studio in which he and Stewart were financial partners. Kasenetz and Katz booked the studio for three months.

When the three-months production deal with Kasenetz-Katz ended, Gouldman returned to New York to work as a staff songwriter for Super K Productions while the remaining three continued to dabble in the studio.

In late 1970, Gouldman returned to the UK to join Stewart, Godley and Creme – who had in the interim scored an international hit single with "Neanderthal Man" under the name of Hotlegs – on an abbreviated British tour supporting the Moody Blues.

== 10cc: 1972–1983 ==
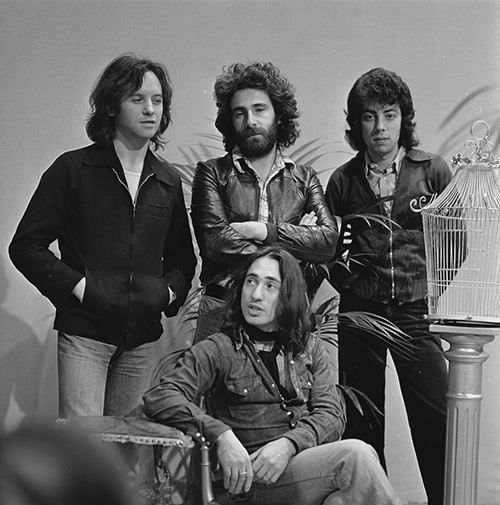
10cc in 1974

The four musicians continued work at Strawberry Studios, producing and backing artists including Cowap, Dave Berry, Wayne Fontana, Herman's Hermits and Neil Sedaka, as well as recording quite a number of one-off singles on many different labels (RCA, Pye, etc.) using many different performer names (including Festival, Tristar Airbus, The New Wave Band, and Grumble). During this period Gouldman also wrote and arranged for the recording of two football songs at Strawberry Studios - "Forever Everton" and "The Boys in Blue", recorded by Everton and Manchester City respectively - despite himself being a Manchester United fan, having attended matches at Old Trafford with his father during his childhood. In July 1972, they were signed by entrepreneur, producer and recording artist Jonathan King and given the name 10cc.

Over the course of the next 7 years, 10cc scored three UK No.1 singles and five Top 10 albums, with Gouldman co-writing some of their biggest hits, including "Rubber Bullets", "The Wall Street Shuffle" (1974), "I'm Not in Love" (1975), "I'm Mandy, Fly Me" (1976), "Art For Art's Sake" (1976), "The Things We Do for Love" (1977) and "Dreadlock Holiday" (1978).

When Kevin Godley and Lol Creme departed in 1976 to explore new musical territories, Gouldman remained with Stewart, continuing the band essentially as a two-piece, although with regular collaborators including Rick Fenn, Paul Burgess, Stuart Tosh and Tony O'Malley. 1980's Look Hear? album marked the end of the band's run of chart success, and 1983's Windows in the Jungle became the last 10cc album for almost a decade.

In 1979, Gouldman scored a minor hit with his single "Sunburn", written for the Farrah Fawcett–Charles Grodin film of the same name. Two years later he produced the Pleasant Dreams album for the Ramones.

Gouldman produced the score for the film Animalympics in 1980, writing most of the soundtrack himself.

== Wax tracks: 1984–1990 ==
Between 1984 and 1990, Gouldman teamed with American singer Andrew Gold, with whom he had co-written material in 1981, to form Wax. They produced four albums. Gold described how the partnership began:

I was called by the (then) head of A&R at Warner Brothers Lenny Waronker, who I had known for years. He asked if I was a fan of 10cc, and I told him that indeed I was, very much. He said the band had a new album they were releasing called Ten Out of 10, and he was of the opinion that, although the album was very strong, it might benefit the US audience to have a few additional cuts tailored more for the American ear. As he knew I was an Anglophile, we might hit it off well.

I said it would be an honour if the band said OK. I spoke to Graham and Eric by phone and soon I was in the UK, co-writing and co-producing three tracks for the album, which was a blast to do and turned out very well. Soon they asked me to join the band, which was an extremely exciting offer. For various reasons, which now seem dumb to me, and after great consideration, I demurred in favour of pursuing my own career and returned to America.

But before long Graham and I were talking again, and he asked if I wanted to return to England to write and just kind of hang for a few weeks. I went and ended up staying for seven months. Eric had decided to take some time off from 10cc, and Graham, ever happy to be working, hunkered down with me, writing and recording in his home studio in Cheshire. Soon, we realised that what we were doing was basically writing and recording a homemade band album.

== 10cc again: 1992–1995 ==
After a nine-year break, Gouldman and Stewart resurrected 10cc for 1992's …Meanwhile album, which also featured performances by Godley, Creme and Gold. Three years later came the final album by the band, Mirror Mirror.

By then, the decades-long partnership between Gouldman and Stewart was apparently over: the pair each wrote and recorded six songs separately, in different countries, playing together on just one song, an acoustic reworking of "I'm Not in Love". Two co-written songs were written during the ...Meanwhile sessions.

The final album featured a song, "Ready to Go Home", written by Gouldman in memory of his father, poet and playwright Hymie Gouldman, who had died in 1991. It was later covered by Morten Harket (singer of the Norwegian pop group A-ha) on his 1995 debut solo album Wild Seed.

In an interview with the Jewish Telegraph, Gouldman spoke of his father's influence on his life and career:

I'm always happy to talk about my father. He was the biggest influence on me. I always used to phone him during my 10cc days for help. Kevin called him "Hyme the Rhyme". He loved words. He always taught me to be original. He had high standards. He was a genius. What he did for a living was incidental, it was the writing that he lived for. And some of that has rubbed off on me.

During the late 1990s Gouldman wrote with a few different writers, including Paul Carrack on his minor 1997 hit "The Way I'm Feeling Tonight", and Kirsty MacColl on her final album Tropical Brainstorm in 2000.

Gouldman included a new version of "Ready to Go Home" on his 2000 solo album, And Another Thing.... On the liner notes of his solo album, he noted: "It reflects my feelings at the time. I suppose I was trying to put a positive slant on his passing, remembering all the things we had done together and his artistic legacy to me. The last verse of the song best reflects my feelings on this. This song has been recorded by many artists and remains one of my favourites. Very emotional." Gouldman regards the song as one of his favourites, explaining "It's quite emotional really. It was written a few years after my Dad passed away, and Andrew had lost his Dad, and we were talking about the legacies – what we're left with, what we're going to do and where we're going to go, and how we have to be accepting."

== 10cc featuring Graham Gouldman and Friends/Godley and Gouldman: 1999–present ==
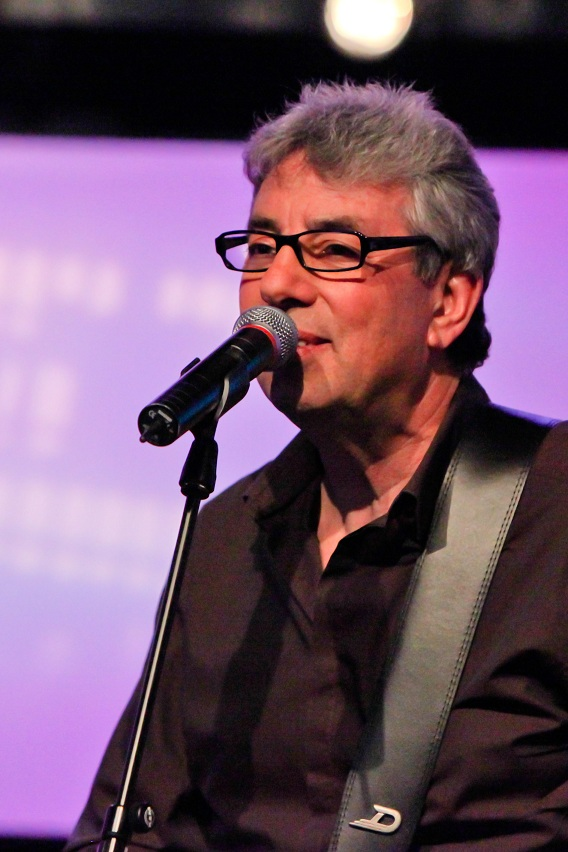
Gouldman performing with 10cc in 2010

Gouldman began touring as "10cc featuring Graham Gouldman and Friends", with his band comprising Rick Fenn, Paul Burgess, Mike Stevens and Mick Wilson. They first performed in 1999, at Ronnie Scott's Jazz Club in Birmingham. After the release of his solo album, he got the lads back together to celebrate 30 years of 10cc in 2002, billed as "Graham Gouldman celebrates 30 years of 10cc".

In January 2004, he reconvened with Kevin Godley to write more songs. Godley described how he and Gouldman had "unfinished business", having only written "three pure, Godley-Gouldman songs". Gouldman said that he and Godley had stayed in touch, and that it was Godley's suggestion to write together.

In July 2006, Godley and Gouldman's website offered four downloadable tracks: "The Same Road", "Johnny Hurts", "Beautifulloser.com" and "Hooligan Crane". The songs are the initial 'offering' of a group of songs they have been working on over the past two years. During this period, Gouldman wrote the main riff in the McFly song "I've Got You".

Gouldman and Friends toured the UK in 2009, simply billed as "10cc". In August 2010, 10cc featuring Graham Gouldman headlined the Sunday bill at the Rhythm Festival.

While touring with 10cc Graham Gouldman formed an acoustic band named Heart Full of Songs aimed to perform acoustic versions of the songs throughout his career. The band took its first solo tour in 2013 and performs regularly ever since.

In February 2014, it was announced that Gouldman would be inducted into the Songwriters Hall of Fame at the 45th annual induction ceremony which was held in New York on 12 June at the Marriott Marquis Hotel.

In 2017, a compilation album of music highlighting Gouldman as a songwriter was released under the name Listen People: The Graham Gouldman Songbook 1964–2005.

In 2018, Gouldman joined Ringo Starr & His All-Starr Band on tour. In November 2019, he announced a new album titled Modesty Forbids featuring Ringo Starr, which was released in March 2020 on the British indie label Lojinx.

== Discography ==
=== Albums ===
- The Graham Gouldman Thing (1968) (USA) RCA Victor LPM-3954 (mono), LSP-3954 (stereo)
- Animalympics (1980) (USA) A&M SP-4580 (soundtrack)
- And Another Thing... (2000) Dome FLYCD14
- Love and Work (2012) Wienerworld
- Modesty Forbids (2020) Lojinx Records
- I Have Notes (2024) Lojinx Records

=== EPs ===
- Play Nicely and Share (2017) Wienerworld, UK; WNRCD5102

with GG/06

- GG/06: EP - 1 (2008)

with Graham Gouldman's Heart Full of Songs

- Graham Gouldman's Heart Full of Songs Xploded Music Limited (2022)

=== Singles ===
Year	Title	Chart positions			Album
Year	Title	UK	AUS	NLD	Album
1966	"Stop Stop Stop (or Honey, I'll Be Gone)" b/w "Better to Have Loved and Lost"	–	–	–	Non-album single
1968	"The Impossible Years" b/w "No Milk Today"	–	–	–	The Graham Gouldman Thing
1968	"Upstairs, Downstairs" b/w "Chestnut"	–	–	–	The Graham Gouldman Thing
1968	"Pamela, Pamela" b/w "For Your Love"	–	–	–	The Graham Gouldman Thing
1969	"Windmills of Your Mind" b/w "Harvey's Tune" (as The Graham Gouldman Orchestra)	–	–	–	Non-album singles
1972	"Nowhere to Go" b/w "Growing Older"	–	–	–	Non-album singles
1979	"Sunburn"	52	26	34	The Original Soundtrack Album From... Sunburn
1980	"Love's Not for Me (Rene's Song)"	–	–	–	Animalympics
2000	"Dancing Days"	–	–	–	And Another Thing...
2022	"Floating in Heaven" (with Brian May)	–	–	–	Non-album single, later included on I Have Notes
