= Andrew Gold (disambiguation) =

Andrew Gold may refer to

- Andrew Gold (1951–2011) American musician
  - Andrew Gold (album)
- Andrew Gold (journalist) (born 1989) British journalist
