= Thank You for Being a Friend (disambiguation) =

Thank You for Being a Friend is a 1978 song by Andrew Gold

Thank You for Being a Friend may also refer to:

- Thank You for Being a Friend (album), 1997 album by Andrew Gold
- Thank You for Being a Friend, 2017 album by 88 Fingers Louie
- Thank You for Being a Friend, 2017 song from My Little Pony: The Movie
