= Thank You for Being a Friend (album) =

Thank You for Being a Friend: The Best of Andrew Gold

Compilation album by Andrew Gold
- Released: June 24, 1997
- Recorded: 1975–96
- Genre: Pop, pop rock
- Length: 77:27
- Label: Rhino
- Producer: Andrew Gold, Peter Asher, Chuck Plotkin, Brock Walsh, Don Was, Graham Gouldman

Professional ratings
Review scores
Source	Rating
AllMusic	4.5/5 stars
Encyclopedia of Popular Music	3/5 stars

Thank You for Being a Friend: The Best of Andrew Gold is a compilation album by singer-songwriter Andrew Gold released in 1997 by Rhino Records.

== Overview ==
The album consists of seventeen songs from Gold's first four Asylum Records studio albums, including hits "Lonely Boy" and "Thank You for Being a Friend", the previously unreleased track "The Final Frontier", the theme from the NBC series Mad About You, and two tracks, "Can Anybody See You" and "The King of Showbiz", taken from 1996 album ...Since 1951 (the liner notes incorrectly state that they are as well previously unreleased).

== Track listing ==
All songs written by Andrew Gold, except where noted.

No.	Title	Writer(s)	Length
1.	"The Final Frontier"	Paul Reiser, Don Was	1:35
2.	"Thank You for Being a Friend"		4:42
3.	"Lonely Boy"		4:23
4.	"Oh Urania (Take Me Away)"		4:21
5.	"Never Let Her Slip Away"		3:27
6.	"How Can This Be Love?"	Gold, Mark Goldenberg	3:57
7.	"You're Free"		4:08
8.	"Hope You Feel Good"	Gold, Steve Ferguson	4:46
9.	"One of Them Is Me"		3:58
10.	"Kiss This One Goodbye"		4:04
11.	"Go Back Home Again"		3:12
12.	"Looking for My Love"		3:37
13.	"Endless Flight"		4:58
14.	"That's Why I Love You"	Gold, Gene Garfin	3:10
15.	"Heartaches in Heartaches"		3:13
16.	"Firefly"		3:22
17.	"Passing Thing"		4:10
18.	"Still You Linger On"		3:20
19.	"Can Anybody See You"	Gold, Graham Gouldman	4:12
20.	"The King of Showbiz"	Gold, Gouldman	4:52
