= What's Wrong with This Picture? =

What's Wrong with This Picture? may refer to:

- What's Wrong with This Picture? (Lee Harding album) (2006)
- What's Wrong with This Picture? (Van Morrison album) (2003)
- What's Wrong with This Picture? (Andrew Gold album) (1976)
