= Lonely Boy (Andrew Gold song) =

1977 single by Andrew Gold

- US single picture sleeve

Single by Andrew Gold

from the album What's Wrong with This Picture?
- B-side: "Must Be Crazy"
- Released: February 11, 1977 (UK); March 1977 (US)
- Recorded: 1976
- Genre: Soft rock; pop
- Length: 4:24
- Label: Asylum
- Songwriter: Andrew Gold
- Producer: Peter Asher

Andrew Gold singles chronology
"That's Why I Love You" (1976)	"Lonely Boy" (1977)	"Go Back Home Again" (1978)

Music video
- "Lonely Boy" on YouTube

"Lonely Boy" is an international hit song from 1977, written and recorded by Andrew Gold in 1976 for his album What's Wrong with This Picture? It spent 5 months on the American charts, peaking at number 7 in both Canada and the United States, the latter for 3 consecutive weeks on June 11, 18 and 25, 1977, and number 11 in the United Kingdom. While "Lonely Boy" was Gold's biggest hit in the US, his "Never Let Her Slip Away" achieved greater success in the UK.

== Overview ==
The song follows the life of a child who feels neglected by his parents after the birth of a younger sister. Many assume this song to be autobiographical, yet Gold denied the implication, despite great similarities between the lyrics and his life. Regarding the verses' first lines: "He was born on a summer day in 1951" matches Gold's August 2, 1951 birthday, "In the summer of '53 his mother/Brought him a sister" matches his sister Martha's July 22, 1953 birthday, and "He left home on a winter day, 1969" may match the formation of Bryndle, of which Andrew was a member, in 1969.

The second verse of the song features backing vocals provided by Linda Ronstadt. Gold had previously worked with Ronstadt as a producer and backing musician.

The song is owned and managed by the estate of Andrew Gold and administered by Kobalt Music.

== Personnel ==
- Andrew Gold – vocals, piano, cowbell, handclaps
- Waddy Wachtel – lead guitar
- Dan Dugmore – rhythm guitar
- Kenny Edwards – bass guitar
- Brock Walsh – electric piano, ARP String Ensemble
- Mike Botts – drums, percussion, sleigh bells
- Linda Ronstadt – backing vocals
- Peter Asher – handclaps

== Chart performance ==
=== Weekly charts ===
Chart (1977)	Peak position
Australia KMR	32
Canada RPM Top Singles	7
Canada RPM Adult Contemporary	25
New Zealand	40
UK Singles Chart	11
U.S. Billboard Hot 100	7
U.S. Billboard Adult Contemporary	38
U.S. Cash Box Top 100	3

=== Year-end charts ===
Chart (1977)	Rank
Canada	78
U.S. Billboard Hot 100	50
U.S. Cash Box	34

== Uses in media and cover versions ==
The song was the final video to be played on the MTV cable channel's first day of broadcast in the United States, on August 1, 1981, and was featured in a number of films, including Boogie Nights (1997), The Waterboy (1998), and The Nice Guys (2016). The song's use in Boogie Nights was designated as one of "The 30 Greatest Rock & Roll Movie Moments" by Rolling Stone magazine.

In February 2000 Foo Fighters recorded a cover of the song to be used as a B-side for an upcoming single off their 1999 album There Is Nothing Left to Lose; however, it was not used as a B-side as planned. On Marc Maron's January 17, 2013, WTF podcast, Foo Fighters leader Dave Grohl said that the band's cover of "Lonely Boy" would eventually be released as the A-side of a special "Solid Gold" 45 rpm single with a Foo Fighters version of Gold's "Never Let Her Slip Away" as the B-side.

In TV series, the song appeared in "The Pool", from This Is Us, first broadcast on October 18, 2016, and "Into the Black," from Animal Kingdom, first broadcast on July 2, 2019.
