= The Skeleton Dance =

1929 film by Walt Disney

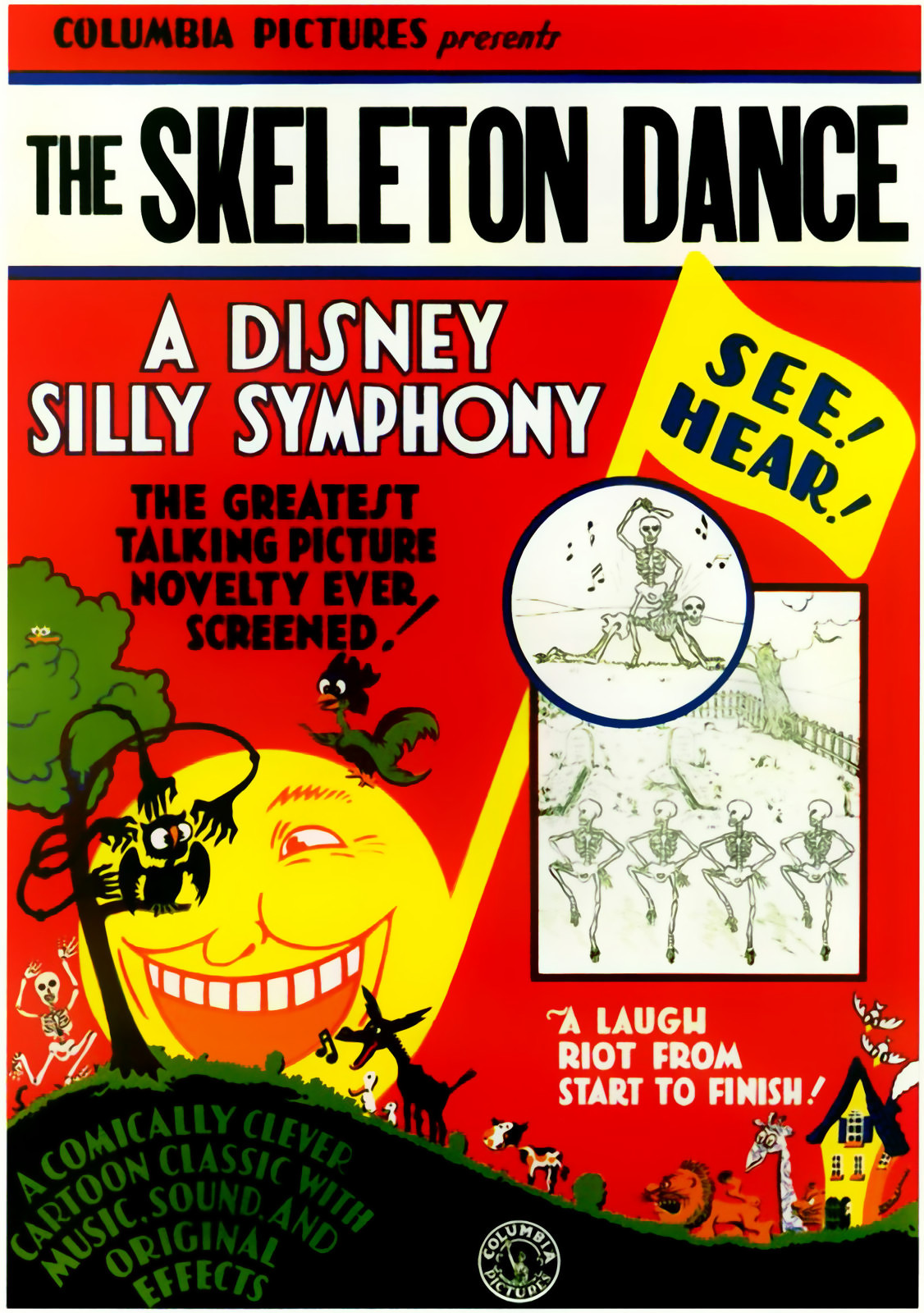
- The Skeleton Dance theatrical release poster
- Directed by: Walt Disney
- Story by: Walt Disney
- Produced by: Walt Disney
- Starring: Walt Disney; Carl W. Stalling
- Music by: Carl W. Stalling
- Animation by: Ub Iwerks; Les Clark; Wilfred Jackson
- Layouts by: Ub Iwerks
- Backgrounds by: Ub Iwerks
- Color process: Black-and-white
- Production company: Disney Cartoons
- Distributed by: Columbia Pictures
- Release date: August 22, 1929
- Running time: 5:31
- Country: United States
- Language: English

The Skeleton Dance is a 1929 American animated comedy horror short film directed and produced by Walt Disney. It is the first installment in the Silly Symphony series. In the film, reanimated human skeletons dance and make music around a spooky graveyard—a modern film example of medieval European "danse macabre" imagery. As a work published in 1929, it entered the public domain on January 1, 2025. (Note: While the notice in the renewal is listed as 1930, the notice on the physical short is 1929. The short entered the public domain based on the earlier notice.)

== Plot ==
The full short

The short film begins with an owl perched on a branch, in front of the full moon, then shows an empty graveyard with a church in the background. The minute hand on the church's clock strikes twelve, causing its bell to start tolling, which causes a group of bats to fly from the belfry. A dog howls at the moon, while two cats fight over a grave. A skeleton emerges from the grave and frolics, but at the sound of the owl, the skeleton hides behind a grave. Upset about overreacting to the owl's hooting, the skeleton detaches its head from its neck and chucks it at the owl, knocking the owl's feathers off. Then the head bounces back to the grave and returns to its body.

Next, four skeletons emerge from the grave and start dancing. One of them takes two bones and plays its partner's spine and head to produce music. Another skeleton dances alone and then plays a cat's tail as if it were a violin. The crowing of a rooster tells them it's close to dawn. The skeletons rush to hide, but their bodies collide and blend. The skeletons, now mingled, rush to the grave and jump in. A pair of skeleton feet get left outside. A skeletal arm emerges from the grave to yank them in.

== Production ==
The origins of The Skeleton Dance can be traced to mid-1928, when Walt Disney was on his way to New York to arrange a distribution deal for his new Mickey Mouse cartoons and to record the soundtrack for his first sound cartoon, Steamboat Willie. During a stopover in Kansas City, Disney paid a visit to his old acquaintance Carl Stalling, then an organist at the Isis Theatre, to compose scores for his first two Mickey shorts, Plane Crazy and The Gallopin' Gaucho. While there, Stalling proposed to Disney a series of "musical novelty" cartoons combining music and animation, which would become the genesis for the Silly Symphony series, and pitched an idea about skeletons dancing in a graveyard. Stalling would eventually join Disney's studio as a staff composer.

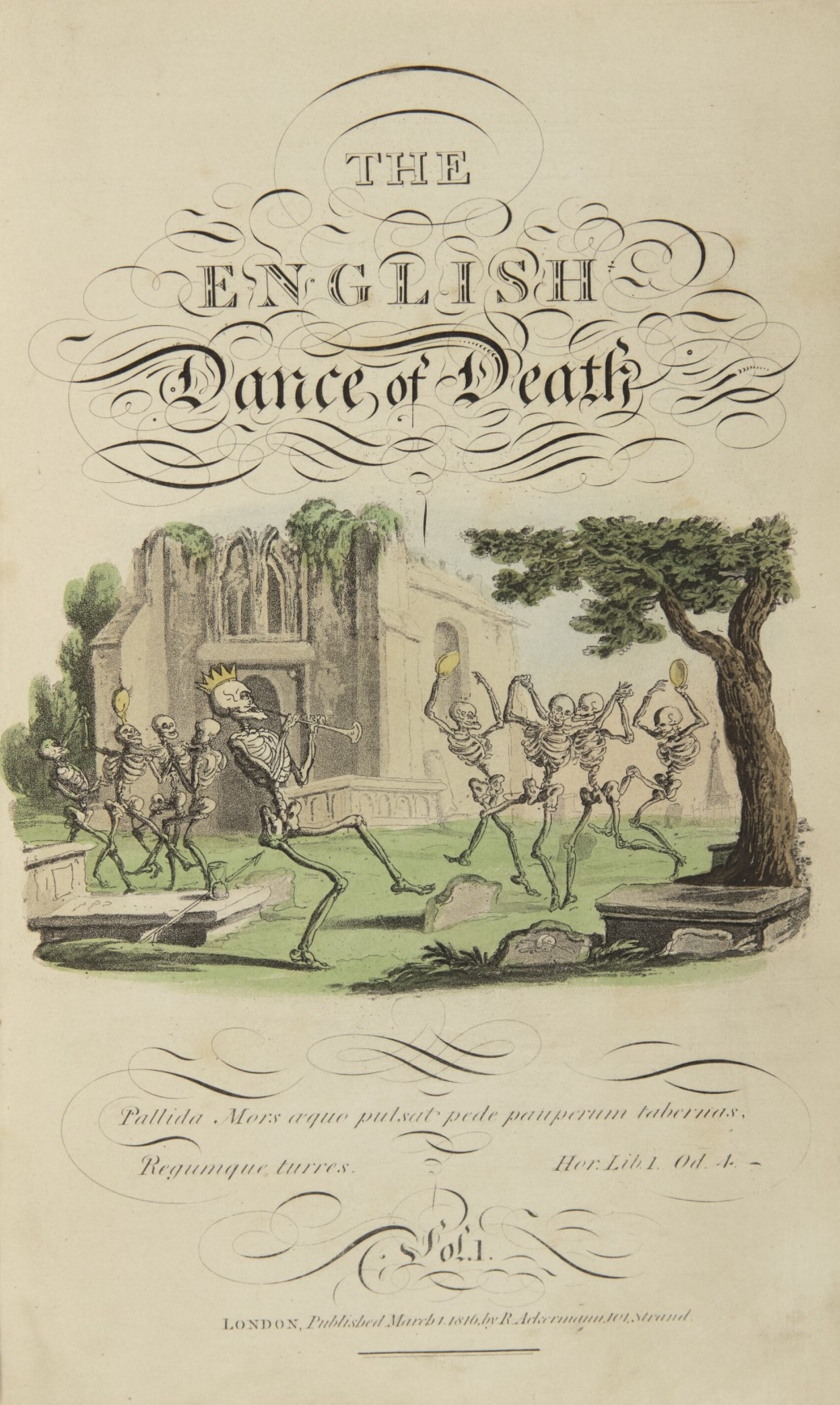
Iwerks was inspired by the frontispiece to Thomas Rowlandson's 1816 edition of satirical etchings, The English Dance of Death.

Animation on The Skeleton Dance began in January 1929, with Ub Iwerks animating the majority of the film in almost six weeks. Iwerks said he had been inspired by "pictures drawn by the English cartoonist Rowlandson".

The soundtrack was recorded at Pat Powers' Cinephone studio in New York in the following month, along with that of the Mickey Mouse short The Opry House. The final negative cost $5,485.40.

== Reception ==
Variety (July 17, 1929): "Title tells the story, but not the number of laughs included in this sounded cartoon short. The number is high. Peak is reached when one skeleton plays the spine of another in xylophone fashion, using a pair of thigh bones as hammers. Perfectly timed xylo accompaniment completes the effect. The skeletons hoof and frolic. One throws his skull at a hooting owl and knocks the latter's feathers off. Four Bones brothers do a unison routine that's a howl. To set the finish, a rooster crows at the dawn. The skeletons, through for the night, dive into a nearby grave, pulling the lid down after them. Along comes a pair of feet, somehow left behind. They kick on the slab and a bony arm reaches out to pull them in. All takes place in a graveyard. Don't bring your children."

The Film Daily (July 21, 1929): "Here is one of the most novel cartoon subjects ever shown on a screen. Here we have a bunch of skeletons knocking out the laughs on their bones, and how. They do a xylophone number with one playing the tune on the other spine. All takes place in a graveyard, and it is a howl from start to finish, with an owl and a rooster brought in for atmosphere."

In 1994, The Skeleton Dance was voted #18 of the 50 Greatest Cartoons of all time by members of the animation field.

== Release ==
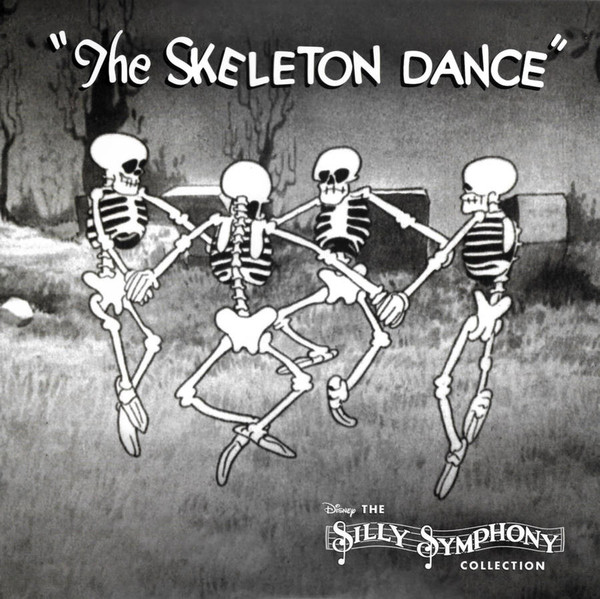
The soundtrack was released on vinyl in 2016.

To attract a national distributor for the Silly Symphony series, Walt and Roy Disney arranged for The Skeleton Dance to run at the Carthay Circle Theatre in Los Angeles and at the Fox Theatre in San Francisco in June 1929, while Pat Powers arranged for it to play at New York's Roxy Theatre from July. In early August, Columbia Pictures agreed to distribute the Silly Symphonies, and The Skeleton Dance played as a Columbia release in September at the Roxy, making it the first picture in the theater's history to have a return engagement.

In March 1931, The New York Times reported that the film had been banned in Denmark for being "too macabre". The short's copyright was renewed in 1957, which expired in 2025, leading to it entering the US public domain.

== Home media ==
The short was released on December 4, 2001, on Walt Disney Treasures: Silly Symphonies - The Historic Musical Animated Classics and on December 2, 2002, on Walt Disney Treasures: Mickey Mouse in Black and White. It was included as a bonus feature on the Diamond Edition Blu-ray of 2009 of Snow White and the Seven Dwarfs. It was released to Disney+ on July 7, 2023.

== Legacy ==
Ub Iwerks left Disney in 1929 to found his own studio with Pat Powers, whose cartoons were unsuccessful, leading to Iwerks subcontracting work to his former employer Screen Gems, Charles Mintz's studio which was owned by Columbia Pictures; he directed the Color Rhapsody cartoon Skeleton Frolic, a spiritual successor to The Skeleton Dance produced in Technicolor, which was released in 1937.

The Skeleton Dance appears in the 2012 video game Epic Mickey 2: The Power of Two as an unlockable short. The film was parodied in The Grim Adventures of Billy & Mandy episode "Hill Billy", where Grim recalls dancing with skeletons 300 years prior. The Skeleton Dance experienced a resurgence in popularity in the late 2000s and early 2010s, largely due to its pairing with the Andrew Gold song "Spooky, Scary Skeletons" as a recurring meme on platforms like, Reddit and YouTube.
