= Spooky, Scary Skeletons =

1996 song by Andrew Gold

"Spooky Scary Skeletons"
- The original album's cover art

Song by Andrew Gold

from the album Halloween Howls: Fun & Scary Music
- Released: August 20, 1996
- Genre: Halloween, novelty
- Length: 2:08
- Label: Craft
- Songwriter: Andrew Gold
- Producer: Andrew Gold

"Spooky, Scary Skeletons" is a Halloween song by American musician Andrew Gold, first released on his 1996 album Halloween Howls: Fun & Scary Music.

Since the 2010s, the song has received a resurgence in popularity online as an Internet meme. In 2013, The Living Tombstone created an electro house remix of the song. In 2019, Intelligencer's Brian Feldman called the song "the Internet's Halloween anthem", and that same year, Rolling Stone's E. J. Dickson referred to the song as the "Halloween meme" of Generation Z. In 2021, Alexandra Petri of The Washington Post ranked the song number two on her list of the 50 best Halloween songs of all time. “Spooky, Scary Skeletons” was adapted into a children's picture book by Random House Children's Books featuring the lyrics to the song on August 27, 2024.

== Background and recording ==
"Spooky, Scary Skeletons" was one of nine original songs on the album Halloween Howls, released, according to Gold on his 1996 liner notes, to "fill a void of availability for fun and scary Halloween original songs". Gold produced, mixed, sang and played all the instruments on the track. It prominently features a xylophone to represent the skeletons' rattling bones.

== Release and Internet popularity ==
The song is often paired with clips of the 1929 animated short film, The Skeleton Dance.

In 1998, Disney included the song on their VHS tape Disney's Sing-Along Songs: Happy Haunting: Party at Disneyland! (which was released on DVD as Disney's Sing-Along Songs: Happy Haunting in 2006). They paired the song with the 1929 animated short film The Skeleton Dance by Ub Iwerks. In 2010, YouTube user TJ Ski remade the video from the VHS tape, pairing the animated short with the song, after he was unable to find the original video online. TJ Ski's video has garnered over 31 million views since it was uploaded.

"Spooky, Scary Skeletons" has since become an Internet meme, with its origins in YouTube gaming culture. One example of an early viral video featuring the track is a video that features Minecraft characters dancing to the song. Since the 2010s, the song has become a standard in music playlists for Halloween parties, along with the 1962 song "Monster Mash".

On October 31, 2013, Israeli-American remix musician Yoav Landau, member of the YouTube band The Living Tombstone, created an electronic dance-like remix of the song with a faster tempo than the original. Their upload of the remix to YouTube has garnered over 109 million views. Intelligencer's Brian Feldman called the Living Tombstone's remix "probably the most well-known version of the song". This remix further propelled the song's status as an Internet meme; both the original song and the Living Tombstone remix are often paired with such visuals as The Skeleton Dance and a video of a man dancing while wearing a pumpkin head and a black unitard, the latter being from a mid-2000s broadcast on local news station KXVO in Omaha, Nebraska.

In 2019, "Spooky, Scary Skeletons" and its The Living Tombstone remix experienced a resurgence of popularity on the short-form video and social media platform TikTok, where over 2.5 million videos featuring the song—including videos by celebrities such as Will Smith dancing to the track—have been posted. By 2022, there were over 5 million TikTok videos featuring the song.

In 2021, Craft Recording issued a first-ever vinyl record release of Halloween Howls, adding one of the more popular remixes of "Spooky, Scary Skeletons" to the tracklist. New cover art was created by Jess Rotter. Craft dedicated a web page to the song. NPR's Elizabeth Blair recommended the vinyl release for children. Official merchandise relating to the song is available at the Andrew Gold store.

== Charts ==
Chart performance for "Spooky, Scary Skeletons"
Chart (2022–2026)	Peak position
Austria (Ö3 Austria Top 40)	69
Canada Hot 100 (Billboard)	22
Germany (GfK)	81
Global 200 (Billboard)	40
Ireland (IRMA)	22
Norway (IFPI Norge)	41
Sweden (Sverigetopplistan)	27
UK Singles (Official Charts)	23
US Billboard Hot 100	35

== Certifications ==
Certifications for "Spooky, Scary Skeletons"
Region	Certification	Certified units/sales
United Kingdom (BPI)	Silver	200,000^{‡}
United States (RIAA)	Platinum	1,000,000^{‡}
^{‡} Sales+streaming figures based on certification alone.

== Cover versions and use in media ==
In 2018, the American rock band Red Hot Chili Peppers performed a cover of the song at a live Halloween performance.

A cover of the song by LVCRFT was used by Freeform to promote their "31 Nights of Halloween" programming block in both 2020 and in 2021.

=== Album releases ===
- 1996: Halloween Howls
- 2019: Halloween Howls Deluxe Edition (Digital including remix bonus tracks)
- 2021: Halloween Howls (Vinyl with remix bonus track)
- 2023: Halloween Howls (Vinyl & CD)
- 2025: Halloween Howls (Vinyl Purple)
- 2026: Halloween Howls (Vinyl Orange)

=== Single releases ===
- 2019: "Undead Tombstone Remix and Extended Remix"
- 2020: "DMA ILLAN REMIX"
- 2021: "The Remixes" (including SharaZ remix)
- 2022: "The Undead Tombstone - Slowed & Reverb Remix"
- 2022: "Dave Wave Remix"
- 2024: "Wubbaduck Remix"
- 2026 "Zachary butler Remix"
