= All This and Heaven Too (album) =

Studio album by Andrew Gold
- Released: April 15, 1978
- Recorded: The Sound Factory, Los Angeles
- Genres: Pop, pop rock
- Length: 41:04
- Label: Asylum
- Producers: Andrew Gold, Brock Walsh

Andrew Gold chronology
| What's Wrong with This Picture? (1976) | All This and Heaven Too (1978) | Whirlwind (1980) |

Singles from All This and Heaven Too
- 1. "How Can This Be Love"; 2. "I'm on My Way"; 3. "Thank You for Being a Friend"; 4. "Never Let Her Slip Away"

Professional ratings
Review scores
| Source | Rating |
|---|---|
| AllMusic | 4.5/5 stars |
| Christgau's Record Guide | C− |
| The Encyclopedia of Popular Music | 3/5 stars |

All This and Heaven Too is the third studio album by singer-songwriter Andrew Gold, released in 1978 on Asylum Records. It includes the hit singles "Never Let Her Slip Away" (a No. 5 entry on the UK Singles Chart) and "Thank You for Being a Friend" (a No. 25 entry on the Billboard singles chart).

== Background ==
All This and Heaven Too reached the British Top Five in the albums chart in 1978. "Thank You for Being a Friend" later gained popularity as the theme song for The Golden Girls, though it was performed by Cynthia "Cindy" Fee, a singer who often recorded advertising jingles, for the show. Gold also became known for his biggest UK hit song, "Never Let Her Slip Away," which was a No. 5 chart hit in the UK; Freddie Mercury assisted Gold as an uncredited background singer on the track.

== Track listing ==
All songs written by Andrew Gold, except where noted.

| No. | Title | Writer(s) | Length |
|---|---|---|---|
| 1. | "How Can This Be Love" | Mark Safan, Mark Goldenberg | 4:01 |
| 2. | "Oh Urania (Take Me Away)" | | 4:22 |
| 3. | "Still You Linger On" | | 3:21 |
| 4. | "Never Let Her Slip Away" | | 3:29 |
| 5. | "Always for You" | | 4:37 |
| 6. | "Thank You for Being a Friend" | | 4:41 |
| 7. | "Looking for My Love" | | 3:39 |
| 8. | "Genevieve" | Gold, Brock Walsh | 5:05 |
| 9. | "I'm on My Way" | Mark Safan | 3:41 |
| 10. | "You're Free" | | 4:08 |

Bonus Tracks (Rhino/Edsel CD release)
| No. | Title | Writer(s) | Length |
|---|---|---|---|
| 1. | "Gambler" | Kenny Edwards | 3:55 |
| 2. | "Thank You for Being a Friend" (outtake) | | 1:33 |
| 3. | "Dr. Robert" (live at the Roxy, Los Angeles, CA, 1978) | John Lennon, Paul McCartney | 3:18 |
| 4. | "Genevieve" (instrumental) | Gold, Brock Walsh | 5:41 |
| 5. | "Still You Linger On" (instrumental) | | 4:50 |

== Charts ==
| Chart (1978) | Peak position |
|---|---|
| Australian (Kent Music Report) | 83 |

== Personnel ==
- Andrew Gold – lead vocals, backing vocals (1, 2, 4, 6, 9, 10), acoustic piano (1–3, 5, 6, 8–10), guitar solo (1), percussion (1, 4–6, 9, 10), clavinet (2), synthesizers (2, 4, 6), guitars (3, 5, 7, 8, 10), electric piano (7, 8, 10), harmonium (7), timpani (7), bass (8), drums (8), acoustic guitar (9), lead guitar (9)
- Waddy Wachtel – guitars (1, 6), electric rhythm guitar (9)
- Kenny Edwards – bass (1, 5, 6, 9), backing vocals (6)
- Leland Sklar – bass (2)
- Brad Palmer – bass (10)
- Rick Marotta – drums (1)
- Russ Kunkel – drums (2)
- Jeff Porcaro – drums (5, 6, 9)
- Beau Segal – drums (10)
- Stix Akimbo – percussion (8)
- Ernie Watts – saxophone (4)
- David Campbell – string and woodwind arrangements, conductor
- Brock Walsh – backing vocals (1, 4, 6, 9, 10), percussion (4)
- JD Souther – backing vocals (4)
- Timothy B. Schmit – backing vocals (4)
- Freddie Mercury – backing vocals (4)
- Mark Safan – backing vocals (9)
- Jennifer Warnes – backing vocals (9)

Production

- Andrew Gold – producer
- Brock Walsh – co-producer
- Dennis Kirk – engineer
- Greg Ladanyi – engineer
- Peter Granet – recording (8)
- George Ybarra – assistant engineer
- Bernie Grundman – mastering at A&M Studios (Hollywood, California)
- Melanie McDowell – production assistant
- John Kosh – art direction, design
- David Alexander – cover photography
- Charles William Bush – sleeve photography
