= Waddy Wachtel =

American musician (born 1947)

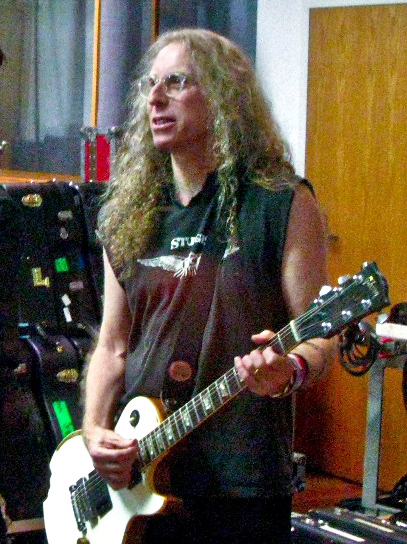
- Wachtel in 2009

Background information
- Born: Robert T. Wachtel; May 24, 1947 (age 79); New York City, U.S.
- Genres: Rock; folk rock; pop; jazz
- Occupations: Musician; composer; record producer; bandleader
- Instruments: Guitar; vocals
- Years active: 1970–present
- Labels: Arista; Elektra; CBS; WEA; Columbia; EMI; Virgin; Asylum; Warner Bros.; Giant
- Website: waddywachtelinfo.com

Robert "Waddy" Wachtel (born May 24, 1947) is an American musician, composer and record producer, most notable for his guitar work. Wachtel has worked as session musician for other artists such as Linda Ronstadt, Beth Hart, Stevie Nicks, Miranda Lambert, Kim Carnes, Randy Newman, Keith Richards, The Rolling Stones (lead guitar on "Saint of Me"), Jon Bon Jovi, James Taylor, Iggy Pop, Warren Zevon, Bryan Ferry, Michael Sweet, Jackson Browne, Karla Bonoff, The Motels and Andrew Gold, both in the studio and live.

== Early years ==
Wachtel was born May 24, 1947, in Jackson Heights, in the New York City borough of Queens, to a Jewish family. At about age 9–10, Wachtel began to learn to play the guitar, taking lessons with teacher Gene Dell (who insisted that he learn to play right-handed despite being naturally left-handed) until about age 14. At that age, he says, he began writing songs.

Wachtel also studied with Rudolph Schramm, who was the head of the NBC staff orchestra and went on to teach music at Carnegie Hall. Schramm tried to get Wachtel to take piano lessons, but Wachtel was intent on playing guitar so Schramm agreed to give him guitar lessons three times a week on rhythm, melody and harmony.

After performing with local bands in the New York area, Wachtel formed his own band, The Orphans, who played in Connecticut and New Hampshire. Eventually the band settled into a regular bar band routine, playing in Newport, Rhode Island, where Wachtel took lessons from Sal Salvador. When the Orphans disbanded, he formed another band, Twice Nicely. At the suggestion of Bud Cowsill (of The Cowsills), he brought Twice Nicely to Los Angeles in 1968 where they recorded a few demos, but after two years, Wachtel decided to work as a session player.

== Films ==
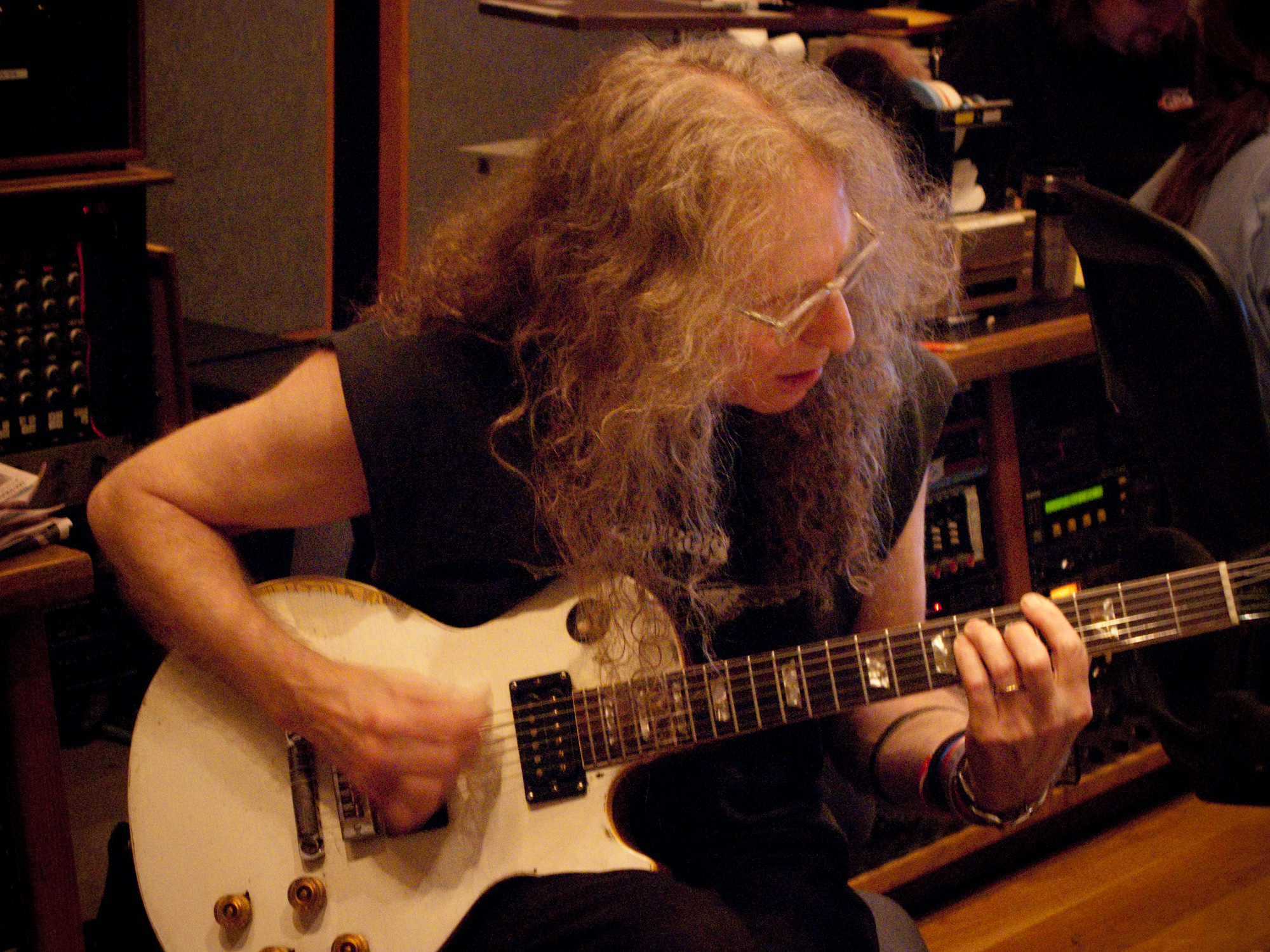
Wachtel with his Les Paul guitar, in 2009

In 1972, he made an appearance in the film The Poseidon Adventure as the acoustic guitar player in a fictitious band on stage in the dining room when the ship capsizes. Waddy appeared alongside Linda Ronstadt in the 1978 film, FM. He also played in the Oscar-winning short film, "Session Man" in 1991.

Wachtel has composed and played instruments for film scores including Joe Dirt, Up in Smoke, Nice Guys Sleep Alone, The Longest Yard, The Benchwarmers, Grandma's Boy, Dickie Roberts: Former Child Star, Strange Wilderness, The House Bunny, and Paul Blart: Mall Cop. He has also composed, produced, or performed in songs with Warren Zevon, Joe Walsh, Jackson Browne, Linda Ronstadt and others.

== Session and touring work ==
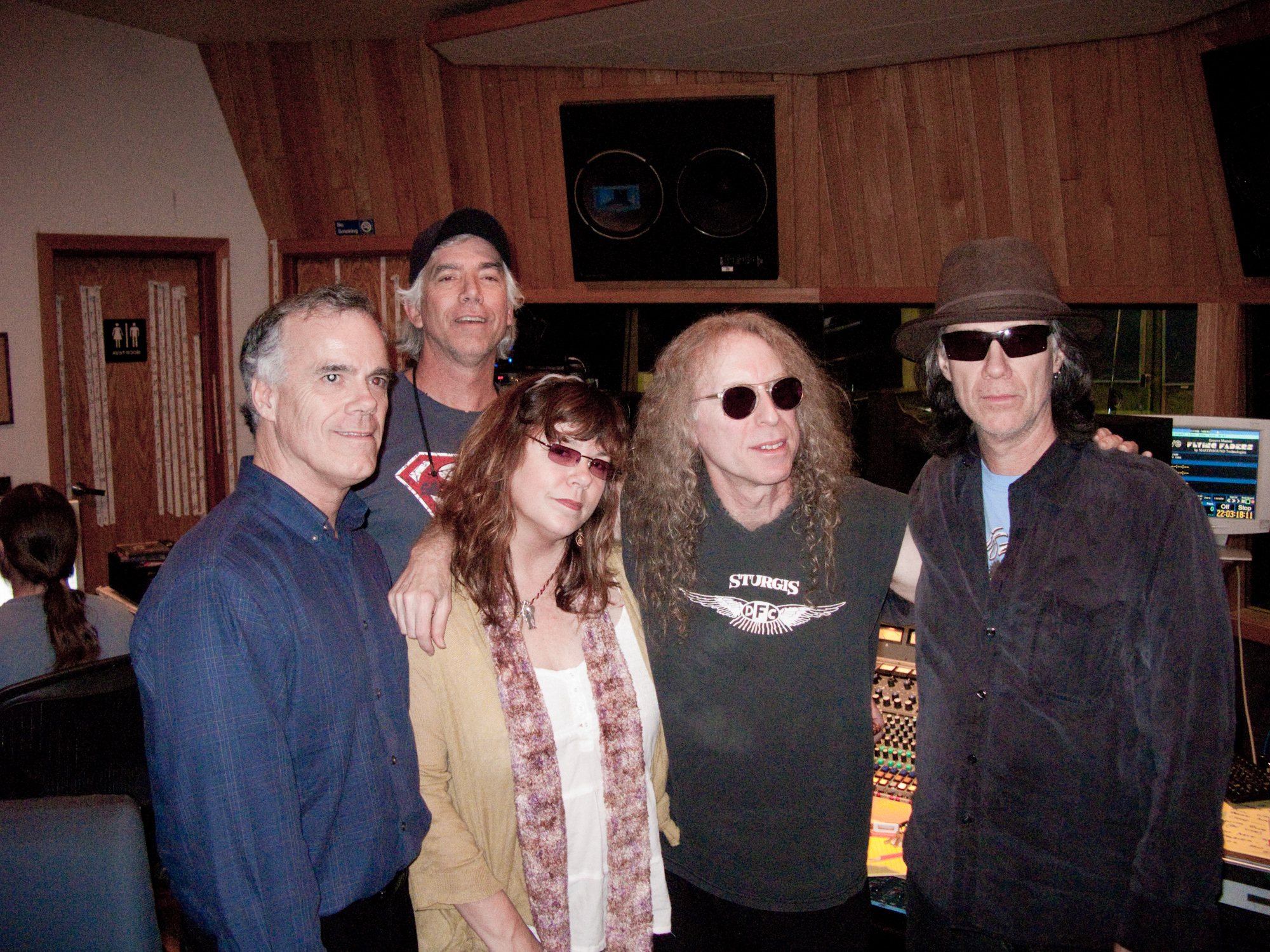
Wachtel with The Cowsills in 2009

In 1972, he was hired by Warren Zevon to play guitar on The Everly Brothers' Stories We Could Tell album and join them in a subsequent tour.

By 1973, he played with Lindsey Buckingham and Stevie Nicks on their first album Buckingham Nicks (credited as 'Waddy', no surname), and on tour. Later, when Nicks and Buckingham joined Fleetwood Mac, he played rhythm guitar on their 1975 album Fleetwood Mac on the track "Sugar Daddy".

In 1980, he wrote, recorded and sang lead vocals on an album for producer Peter Asher with members of Linda Ronstadt's band, including musicians Don Grolnick, Dan Dugmore, Stanley Sheldon and Rick Marotta. Both the group and the album were titled Ronin. Released on the Mercury label, the record never charted.

In 1984, he played on Steve Perry's (Journey) solo album Street Talk.

He has appeared on hundreds of albums with many different artists and bands.

Production credits include albums by Stevie Nicks, Keith Richards, Jackson Browne, Bryan Ferry, The Church, Sand Rubies, George Thorogood and the Destroyers and Warren Zevon. Wachtel co-wrote several songs with Zevon including "Werewolves of London". He also co-wrote the Warren Zevon song "Things to Do in Denver When You're Dead" from the album Mr. Bad Example. He performed on all seven Warren Zevon albums from 1976 through 1992, producing or co-producing three.

Wachtel also shares co-writing credits with Stevie Nicks on a few tracks such as "Annabel Lee", and "I Don't Care".

Wachtel has been credited on some albums as Bob Wachtel, but some online sources have incorrectly credited him as Richard Wachtel on albums on which he was credited as having played guitar.

== Legal problems ==
Wachtel was arrested in 1998 on suspicion of possession of child pornography after images were found on a computer he had at home. Wachtel pleaded no contest and was placed on probation for three years.

Musician Brett Tuggle defended Wachtel saying "there is no way that Stevie would have him in her band if she thought he was guilty of any wrongdoing." A detective of the Los Angeles juvenile sex crimes division reported that Wachtel produced copies of the computer-stored images which he kept in his bedroom.

== Equipment ==
Wachtel plays a 1960 Gibson Les Paul and 1957 Fender Stratocaster. He said in a 1980 interview that the newest made guitar he owned was a 1964 Fender Stratocaster. Wachtel purchased the Les Paul guitar from Stephen Stills for $350. In September 2014 the Gibson Custom Shop chose the 1960 Les Paul Waddy Wachtel guitar for their new Collector's Choice series.

== 2000 to present ==
Wachtel performs regularly with the Waddy Wachtel Band in the Los Angeles area, notably at The Joint from 2000 through 2013. The band at that time included Phil Jones, Rick Rosas, Bernard Fowler and Blondie Chaplin, among others. He continues to gig with his band, with some personnel changes, while retaining Fowler and Chaplin. Many famous artists have performed with the band as special guests.

Wachtel appeared on the 2010 Grammy Award television show backing Taylor Swift's live presentation. In Swift's duet with Nicks on the song "Rhiannon", Wachtel was featured on lead guitar.

As of 2020, Wachtel is performing with a group of other Southern California classic rock veterans in a group called "The Immediate Family" along with Danny Kortchmar, Leland Sklar, Russ Kunkel, and Steve Postell.

On October 12, 2024, Wachtel appeared as lead guitarist with Stevie Nicks as the musical guest on Saturday Night Live.

== Collaborations ==
With Bill Cowsill

- Nervous Breakthrough (MGM Records, 1970)

With The Everly Brothers

- Stories We Could Tell (RCA Victor, 1972)

With Lindsey Buckingham and Stevie Nicks

- Buckingham Nicks (Polydor, 1973)

With Sarah Kernochan

- Best Around the Bush (RCA Records, 1974)

With Jackie DeShannon

- New Arrangement (Columbia Records, 1975)

With Fleetwood Mac

- Fleetwood Mac (Reprise Records, 1975)

With John Stewart

- Wingless Angels (RCA Records, 1975)

With Splinter

- Harder to Live (Dark Horse Records, 1975)

With Dianne Brooks

- Back Stairs in My Life (Reprise Records, 1976)

With Barbi Benton

- Something New (Polydor Records, 1976)

With Jackson Browne

- The Pretender (Asylum Records, 1976)
- Lives in the Balance (Asylum Records, 1986)
- I'm Alive (Elektra Records, 1993)
- Looking East (Elektra Records, 1996)
- Downhill from Everywhere (Inside Recordings, 2021)

With Andrew Gold

- What's Wrong with This Picture? (Asylum Records, 1976)
- All This and Heaven Too (Asylum Records, 1977)
- Whirlwind (Asylum Records, 1980)

With Arlo Guthrie

- Amigo (Reprise Records, 1976)

With Carole King

- Thoroughbred (A&M Records, 1976)

With Tom Pacheco

- The Outsider (RCA Records, 1976)

With Tom Snow

- Tom Snow (Capitol Records, 1976)

With Maria Muldaur

- Sweet Harmony (Reprise Records, 1976)

With Linda Ronstadt

- Hasten Down the Wind (Asylum Records, 1976)
- Simple Dreams (Asylum Records, 1977)
- Living in the USA (Asylum Records, 1978)
- Get Closer (Asylum Records, 1982)
- We Ran (Elektra Records, 1998)

With JD Souther

- Black Rose (Asylum Records, 1976)
- You're Only Lonely (Columbia Records, 1979)
- Home by Dawn (Warner Bros. Records, 1984)

With James Taylor

- In the Pocket (Warner Bros. Records, 1976)
- Flag (Columbia Records, 1979)
- Dad Loves His Work (Columbia Records, 1981)

With Wendy Waldman

- The Main Refrain (Warner Bros. Records, 1976)

With Sammy Walker

- Sammy Walker (Warner Bros. Records, 1976)

With Nickey Barclay

- Diamond in a Junkyard (Ariola America, 1976)

With Rusty Wier

- Black Hat Saloon (Columbia Records, 1976)
- Stacked Deck (Columbia Records, 1977)

With Warren Zevon

- Warren Zevon (Asylum Records, 1976)
- Excitable Boy (Asylum Records, 1978)
- Bad Luck Streak in Dancing School (Elektra Records, 1980)
- The Envoy (Asylum Records, 1982)
- Sentimental Hygiene (Virgin Records, 1987)
- Transverse City (Virgin Records, 1989)
- Mr. Bad Example (Giant, 1991)

With Karla Bonoff

- Karla Bonoff (Columbia Records, 1977)
- Restless Nights (Columbia Records, 1979)
- Wild Heart of the Young (Columbia Records, 1982)

With Nancy Shanks

- Nancy Shanx (United Artists Records, 1977)

With Attitudes

- Good News (Dark Horse Records, 1977)

With Randy Newman

- Little Criminals (Reprise Records, 1977)
- Born Again (Reprise Records, 1979)
- Trouble in Paradise (Reprise Records, 1983)
- Randy Newman's Faust (Reprise Records, 1995)

With Bryan Ferry

- The Bride Stripped Bare (EG Records, 1978)

With The Pointer Sisters

- Energy (Planet Records, 1978)
- Priority (Planet Records, 1979)
- So Excited! (Planet Records, 1982)

With Bob Weir

- Heaven Help the Fool (Arista Records, 1978)

With Leo Sayer

- Leo Sayer (Chrysalis Records, 1978)

With Debby Boone

- Debby Boone (Capitol Records, 1979)

With Richie Furay

- I Still Have Dreams (Asylum Records, 1979)
- In The Country (BMG, 2022)

With Adam Mitchell

- Redhead in Trouble (Warner Bros. Records, 1979)

With Ronnie Hawkins

- The Hawk (United Artists Records, 1979)

With Louise Goffin

- Kid Blue (Asylum Records, 1979)
- Louise Goffin (Asylum Records, 1981)

With Bonnie Raitt

- The Glow (Warner Bros. Records, 1979)

With America

- Alibi (Capitol Records, 1980)

With Kim Carnes

- Mistaken Identity (EMI, 1981)
- Voyeur (EMI, 1982)
- Café Racers (EMI, 1983)
- Barking at Airplanes (EMI, 1985)
- Light House (EMI, 1986)

With Rita Coolidge

- Heartbreak Radio (A&M Records, 1981)

With Stevie Nicks

- Bella Donna (Atco Records, 1981)
- The Wild Heart (Modern Records, 1983)
- Rock a Little (Modern Records, 1985)
- The Other Side of the Mirror (Modern Records, 1989)
- Street Angel (Modern Records, 1994)
- Trouble in Shangri-La (Reprise Records, 2001)
- In Your Dreams (Reprise Records, 2011)
- 24 Karat Gold: Songs from the Vault (Reprise Records, 2014)

With Helen Reddy

- Play Me Out (MCA Records, 1981)

With Phoebe Snow

- Rock Away (Mirage, 1981)

With Ronnie Wood

- 1234 (Columbia Records, 1981)
- I Feel Like Playing (Eagle Rock Entertainment, 2010)

With Don Henley

- I Can't Stand Still (Asylum Records, 1982)
- The End of the Innocence (Geffen, 1989)

With Kenny Rogers

- Love Will Turn You Around (Liberty Records, 1982)

With Bill Medley

- Right Here and Now (Planet Records, 1982)

With Bob Seger

- The Distance (Capitol Records, 1982)
- The Fire Inside (Capitol Records, 1991)

With Bette Midler

- No Frills (Atlantic Records, 1983)

With Marty Balin

- Lucky (EMI, 1983)

With Ringo Starr

- Old Wave (RCA Records, 1983)
- Time Takes Time (Private Music, 1992)

With Joe Walsh

- You Bought It – You Name It (Warner Bros. Records, 1983)
- The Confessor (Warner Bros. Records, 1985)
- Ordinary Average Guy (Epic Records, 1991)

With Dolly Parton

- The Great Pretender (RCA Records, 1984)
- Rainbow (Columbia Records, 1987)
- Rockstar (Big Machine Records, 2023)

With Steve Perry

- Street Talk (Columbia Records, 1984)

With Eric Martin

- Eric Martin (Capitol Records, 1985)

With Jimmy Barnes

- For the Working Class Man (Mushroom Records, 1985)

With Rosanne Cash

- Rhythm & Romance (Columbia Records, 1985)

With Graham Nash

- Innocent Eyes (Atlantic Records, 1986)

With Karla DeVito

- Wake 'Em Up In Tokyo (A&M Records, 1986)

With Van Stephenson

- Suspicious Heart (MCA Records, 1986)

With Dwight Twilley

- Wild Dogs (CBS Records, 1986)

With Cher

- Cher (Geffen, 1987)
- Heart of Stone (Geffen, 1989)

With Lisa Hartman Black

- 'Til My Heart Stops (Atlantic Records, 1987)

With Melissa Etheridge

- Melissa Etheridge (Island Records, 1988)
- Brave and Crazy (Island Records, 1989)
- Yes I Am (Island Records, 1993)

With Ivan Neville

- If My Ancestors Could See Me Now (Polydor Records, 1988)
- Saturday Morning Music (UpTop Entertainment, 2002)
- Scrape (Evangeline Recorded Works, 2004)

With Keith Richards

- Talk Is Cheap (Virgin Records, 1988)
- Main Offender (Virgin Records, 1992)
- Crosseyed Heart (Republic Records, 2015)

With Feargal Sharkey

- Wish (Virgin Records, 1988)

With The Graces

- Perfect View (A&M Records, 1989)

With Jon Bon Jovi

- Blaze of Glory (Columbia Records, 1990)

With Steve Louw

- Waiting For the Down (Epic Records, 1990)

With Bob Dylan

- Under the Red Sky (Columbia Records, 1990)

With Iggy Pop

- Brick by Brick (Virgin Records, 1990)

With Hall & Oates

- Change of Season (Arista Records, 1990)

With Diana Ross

- The Force Behind the Power (Motown Records, 1991)

With Rod Stewart

- Vagabond Heart (Warner Bros. Records, 1991)

With Troy Newman

- Gypsy Moon (Warner Bros. Records, 1991)
- It's Like This (Mega Pop Records, 1995)

With Bonnie Tyler

- Bitterblue (Hansa Records, 1991)

With Tracy Chapman

- Matters of the Heart (Elektra Records, 1992)

With Neil Diamond

- The Christmas Album (Columbia Records, 1992)
- The Christmas Album, Volume II (Columbia Records, 1994)

With Hanne Boel

- My Kindred Spirit (Medley Records, 1992)

With Delbert McClinton

- Never Been Rocked Enough (Curb, 1992)

With Tom Waits

- Bone Machine (Island Records, 1992)

With Andrew Strong

- Strong (MCA Records, 1993)

With Gilby Clarke

- Pawnshop Guitars (Virgin Records, 1994)
- The Hangover (Paradigm Records, 1997)

With Big Mountain

- Unity (Giant, 1994)

With A. J. Croce

- That's Me in the Bar (Private Music, 1995)

With Colin James

- Bad Habits (Warner Music Canada, 1995)

With Brian Wilson

- I Just Wasn't Made for These Times (MCA Records, 1995)

With Aaron Neville

- The Tattooed Heart (A&M Records, 1995)

With John Prine

- Lost Dogs and Mixed Blessings (Oh Boy Records, 1995)

With Michael Sweet

- Real (Benson, 1995)

With Bee Gees

- Still Waters (Polydor Records, 1997)

With The Wilsons

- The Wilsons (Polygram Records, 1997)

With The Rolling Stones

- Bridges to Babylon (Virgin Records, 1997)

With Johnny Rivers

- Last Train to Memphis (Soul City, 1998)
- Reinvention Highway (Collectors' Choice Music, 2004)

With Amanda Marshall

- Tuesday's Child (Epic Records, 1999)

With Janice Robinson

- The Color Within Me (Columbia Records, 1999)

With Kim Richey

- Glimmer (Mercury Records, 1999)

With Shannon McNally

- Jukebox Sparrows (Capitol Records, 2002)

With Robbie Williams

- Escapology (EMI, 2002)
- Intensive Care (Chrysalis Records, 2005)

With Keith Gattis

- Big City Blues (Smith Music Group, 2005)

With Bernard Fowler

- Friends With Privileges (Sony, 2006)
- The Bura (MRI, 2016)

With Radney Foster

- This World We Live In (Dualtone Records, 2006)

With Miranda Lambert

- Crazy Ex-Girlfriend (Columbia Nashville, 2007)

With John Mayer

- Battle Studies (Columbia Records, 2009)

With David Nail

- I'm About to Come Alive (MCA Records, 2009)

With Michael Grimm

- Michael Grimm (Epic Records, 2011)

With Jessie Baylin

- Little Spark (Blonde Rat, 2012)

With LeAnn Rimes

- Spitfire (Curb Records, 2013)
- One Christmas: Chapter 1 (Iconic, 2014)
- God's Work (EverLe, 2022)

With Edie Brickell and Steve Martin

- Love Has Come for You (Rounder Records, 2013)

With Judith Owen

- Ebb & Flow (Twanky Records, 2014)
- Somebody's Child (Twanky Records, 2016)

With Neil Young

- Storytone (Reprise Records, 2014)

With Mindi Abair

- Wild Heart (Heads Up, 2014)

With Pat McGee

- Pat McGee (Pat McGee, 2015)

With Beth Hart

- Fire on the Floor (Provologue Records, 2016)

With Sheryl Crow

- Threads (Big Machine Records, 2019)

With Anders Osborne

- Buddha & The Blues (Back on Dumaine Records, 2019)
- Picasso's Villa (5Th Ward Records, 2024)

With Kate Taylor

- Why Wait! (Red House Records, 2021)

With Edgar Winter

- Brother Johnny (Quarto Valley Records, 2022)

With Ian Hunter

- Defiance Part 1 (Sun, 2023)
- Defiance Part 2: Fiction (Sun, 2024)

With Barbra Streisand

- The Secret of Life: Partners, Volume Two (Columbia Records, 2025)

With Willie Nile

- The Great Yellow Right (River House Records, 2025)

== Selected filmography ==
Year	Title	Director(s)	Notes
1972	The Poseidon Adventure	Ronald Neame	Uncredited guitarist
1978	Up in Smoke	Lou Adler	with Danny Kortchmar and Lee Oskar (member of Yesca)
1978	FM	John A. Alonzo	with Linda Ronstadt
2001	Joe Dirt	Dennie Gordon	—N/a
2003	Dickie Roberts: Former Child Star	Sam Weisman	with Christophe Beck
2006	Grandma's Boy	Nicholaus Goossen	—N/a
2006	The Benchwarmers	Dennis Dugan	—N/a
2006	Last Request	John DeBellis	—N/a
2008	Strange Wilderness	Fred Wolf	—N/a
2008	The House Bunny	Fred Wolf	—N/a
2009	Paul Blart: Mall Cop	Steve Carr	—N/a
2011	Bucky Larson: Born to Be a Star	Tom Brady	—N/a
2011	Jack and Jill	Dennis Dugan	with Rupert Gregson-Williams
2013	Jimi: All Is by My Side	John Ridley	with Danny Bramson
2015	Joe Dirt 2: Beautiful Loser	Fred Wolf	Digital film

== Personal life ==
Wachtel is married. He has an estranged son named Waddy who lives in Hilton Head Island, SC.
