= Cindy Fee =

American singer (born 1954)

Cynthia "Cindy" Fee
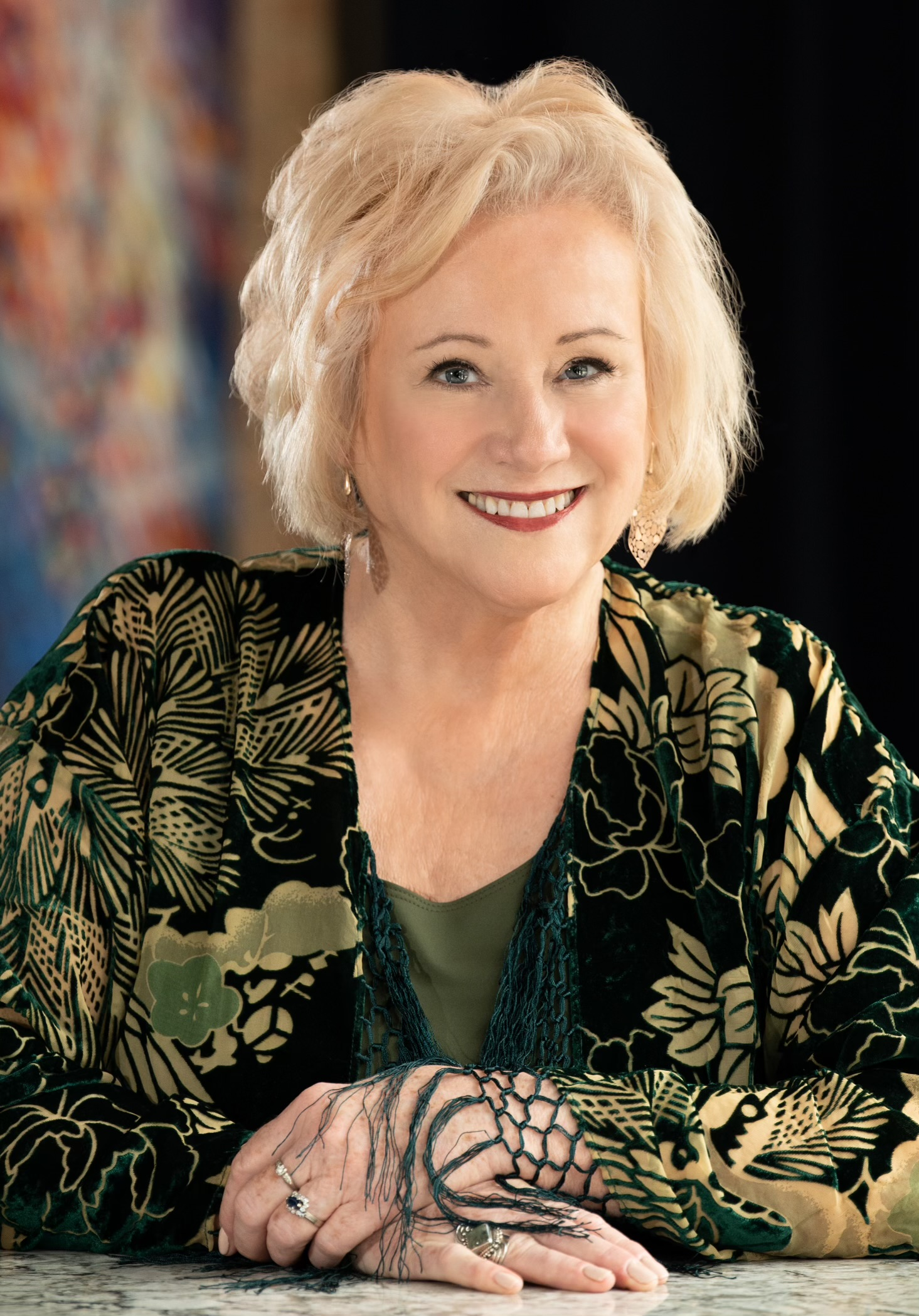
- Fee in 2023
- Born: December 6, 1954 (age 71) Detroit, Michigan
- Occupation: Singer; recording artist
- Period: 1970–present
- Genre: R&B; country soul
- Notable works: "Thank You for Being a Friend" (Andrew Gold cover), from the NBC sitcom The Golden Girls

Cynthia L. "Cindy" Fee (born December 6, 1954) is an American singer and recording artist. She is best known for performing "Thank You for Being a Friend" (a cover of the 1978 Andrew Gold hit), the opening theme song for the Emmy- and Golden Globe-winning sitcom The Golden Girls.

== Early life ==
Cynthia L. "Cindy" Fee was born in Detroit, Michigan, and grew up in Raytown, Missouri, where she was active in music and theater at Raytown High School.

== Career ==
Fee started performing professionally at sixteen, working Kansas City-area restaurants, clubs, local theaters, and amusement parks. In 1973, Fee became a founding member, along with Eric Bikales, of the Kansas City band Hotfoot and also sang with the jazz group the Means/Devan Trio.

=== Golden Girls theme song — "Thank You For Being a Friend" ===
Fee recorded a cover of Andrew Gold's song "Thank You for Being a Friend" for the credits of The Golden Girls. During the show's first run and in syndication, the song became well known. In honor of Betty White's 90th birthday, President Barack Obama released a video of him listening to the theme song. After White's death in 2021, the sitcom and theme song were streamed 384 million times in one week alone. After going viral in 2022, the Golden Con convention, a fan convention, returned to Chicago in 2023 featuring Fee as a headline performer.

=== Other recordings ===
Fee also recorded chart-topping records with some of the best-selling music artists of all time. Her discography includes a duet with Kenny Rogers, "I Don't Want to Know Why", from the platinum-selling album, What About Me? Fee is also a credited background singer on the Kenny Rogers album Christmas, which peaked at #34 in the US, and Rogers's Share Your Love, which peaked at #6 in the US. She has also performed as a background singer for Garth Brooks, Dolly Parton, Whitney Houston, and Lionel Richie. Fee also released her own albums Dancin in My Sleep and Young at Heart, the latter with noted rockabilly guitarist Eddie Angel, a founding member of Los Straitjackets.

=== Jingles and television commercials ===
Fee is also a prolific jingle and TV commercial singer. Fee's commercial jingle credits include: "Get on Your Pontiac and Ride", for Hoover, "Nobody Does It Like You" and "What the Big Boys Eat", from a Wheaties cereal campaign. Fee's voice was also featured in commercials for Chevy Trucks, McDonald's, Miller Beer, Chick-fil-A, Home Depot, Goodyear, Hot Pockets, Barbie, John Deere, NASCAR, Ford, Toyota, Purina, Avon, and American Airlines. Fee's Wheaties and Hoover commercials were awarded Clio awards.

== Personal life ==
She is married to Robert Landis and has two adult children, Ethan and Rory Landis. Fee frequently performs a genre she calls "country soul", a combination of Motown and country, and has appeared live at venues including in Nashville, Chicago, Los Angeles, as well as in Europe. She is frequently recognized at events and conventions and interviewed about her career.
