= Whirlwind (Andrew Gold album) =

Studio album by Andrew Gold
- Released: April 1980
- Recorded: The Sound Factory (Los Angeles, California); Record One (Sherman Oaks, California)
- Genres: Pop, pop rock
- Length: 37:42
- Label: Asylum
- Producer: Andrew Gold

Andrew Gold chronology
All This and Heaven Too (1978)	Whirlwind (1980)	…Since 1951 (1996)

Whirlwind is the fourth album by singer-songwriter Andrew Gold, released in 1980 on Asylum Records. It is Gold's final major label album and last solo album of any kind for over a decade.

== Reception ==
Professional ratings
Review scores
Source	Rating
AllMusic	2/5 stars
The Encyclopedia of Popular Music	2/5 stars

Rolling Stone's Stephen Holden called Whirlwind "a well-crafted album of imitation rock by a pop sentimentalist unconvincingly crying tough." Concluding that "the record merely reaffirms Andrew Gold's skill as a meticulous pop interior designer recycling Sixties guitar hooks into blandly tasteful studio settings." Reviewers of Billboard noticed that this album was more rocking than two previous works.

AllMusic's James Chrispell retrospectively noted "[t]he hits were not forthcoming" and the "album came and went in nearly the blink of an eye, and not much else was heard from Andrew Gold's once-promising solo career."

== Track listing ==
All songs written by Andrew Gold, except where noted.

No.	Title	Writer(s)	Length
1.	"Kiss This One Goodbye"		4:03
2.	"Whirlwind"		4:16
3.	"Sooner or Later"		3:32
4.	"Leave Her Alone"		3:31
5.	"Little Company"		4:17
6.	"Brand New Face"		4:45
7.	"Nine to Five"		4:04
8.	"Stranded on the Edge"	Gold, Mark Goldenberg	4:06
9.	"Make Up Your Mind"		5:08

Bonus Tracks (Rhino/Edsel CD release)
No.	Title	Writer(s)	Length
1.	"Gambler"	Kenny Edwards	3:51
2.	"Endless Flight" (live at the Gator Bowl, Jacksonville, FL, 1978)		5:17
3.	"The 'In' Crowd"	Billy Page	6:00
4.	"Traffic Jam"	Gold, Bryan Garofalo, Mike Botts	1:27

== Personnel ==
- Andrew Gold – lead vocals, guitars, organ (1, 4, 8), percussion (1, 9), synthesizers (2, 9), acoustic piano (3, 9), keyboards (7), tambourine (8), backing vocals (8)
- Don Grolnick – acoustic piano (5)
- Waddy Wachtel – 2nd lead guitar (5)
- Bryan Garofalo – bass (1–4, 6–9)
- Kenny Edwards – bass (5)
- Mike Botts – drums (1–4, 6–9)
- Rick Marotta – drums (5)
- Brock Walsh – backing vocals

Production

- Andrew Gold – producer
- Greg Ladanyi – engineer
- Jim Nipar – engineer
- Doug Sax – mastering at The Mastering Lab (Hollywood, California)
- Melanie McDowell – production assistant
- Ron Coro – art direction, design
- Jim Shea – photography
