= Rick Marotta =

American drummer (born 1948)

- Born: Richard Thomas Marotta; January 7, 1948 (age 78); New York City, New York, U.S.
- Genres: Rock; pop; jazz
- Occupation: Musician
- Instruments: Drums; percussion

Richard Thomas Marotta (born January 7, 1948) is an American drummer and percussionist. He has appeared on recordings by leading artists such as Aretha Franklin, Carly Simon, Steely Dan, James Taylor, Paul Simon, John Lennon, Hall & Oates, Stevie Nicks, Wynonna, Roy Orbison, Todd Rundgren, Roberta Flack, Peter Frampton, Quincy Jones, Jackson Browne, Al Kooper, Waylon Jennings, Randy Newman, Kenny G, The Jacksons, Crosby, Stills & Nash, Boz Scaggs, Warren Zevon, and Linda Ronstadt. He is also a composer who created music for the popular television shows See Dad Run, Everybody Loves Raymond and Yes, Dear.

== Biography ==
Marotta was born in New York City and taught himself to play drums at the age of nineteen. He was in a band called The Riverboat Soul Band; it released an album called Mess-up in 1968.

Marotta was the drummer for his own group in the early 1970s, the short-lived Brethren. Tom Cosgrove sang and played lead, Stu Woods played bass, and Mike Garson played keyboards. They released two albums; the first was the eponymous Brethren, which was mildly successful. The second, released as the band was crumbling, is nearly impossible to find. The band had a unique sound, a mixture of rock and country, with traces of jazz and influences from Dr. John, who wrote the album notes and the song "Loop Garoo" for them. Marotta has composed music for the television sitcoms Everybody Loves Raymond and Yes, Dear. He made a guest appearance in the episode "Johnny and the Pace Makers" of the situation comedy Double Rush in 1995.

His brother Jerry is also a noted drummer and percussionist who has recorded and toured with Peter Gabriel.

== Selected discography ==
With Peter Allen

- I Could Have Been a Sailor (A&M, 1979)

With Ashford & Simpson

- So So Satisfied (Warner Bros., 1977)

With Marty Balin

- Lucky (EMI, 1983)

With Karla Bonoff

- Restless Nights (Columbia, 1979)

With Jackson Browne

- Hold Out (Asylum, 1980)

With Felix Cavaliere

- Destiny (Bearsville, 1975)

With Toni Childs

- Union (A&M, 1988)
- House of Hope (A&M, 1991)

With Gene Clark

- Firebyrd (Takoma, 1984)

With Linda Clifford

- I'll Keep on Loving You (Capitol, 1982)

With Shawn Colvin

- Steady On (Columbia Records, 1989)

With Randy Crawford

- Everything Must Change (Warner Bros., 1976)
- Raw Silk (Warner Bros., 1979)

With Jim Croce

- I Got a Name (ABC Records, 1973)

With Crosby, Stills & Nash

- After the Storm (Columbia, 1994)

With Yvonne Elliman

- Yvonne Elliman (Decca, 1972)

With Skip Ewing

- The Coast of Colorado (MCA Records, 1988)
- The Will to Love (MCA Records, 1989)

With Bryan Ferry

- The Bride Stripped Bare (EG Records, 1978)

With Dan Fogelberg

- Exiles (Epic, 1987)

With Aretha Franklin

- Let Me in Your Life (Atlantic, 1974)

With Michael Franks

- Tiger in the Rain (Warner Bros., 1979)
- One Bad Habit (Warner Bros., 1980)

With Dean Friedman

- Dean Friedman (Lifesong, 1977)

With Art Garfunkel

- Scissors Cut (Columbia, 1981)

With Ellie Greenwich

- Let It Be Written, Let it Be Sung (Verve, 1973)

With Nanci Griffith

- Little Love Affairs (MCA, 1988)

With Henry Gross

- Show Me to the Stage (Lifesong, 1977)
- Love Is the Stuff (Lifesong, 1978)

With Andrew Gold

- All This and Heaven Too (Asylum Records, 1977)
- Whirlwind (Asylum Records, 1980)

With Hall & Oates

- Abandoned Luncheonette (Atlantic, 1973)

With Beth Hart

- Fire on the Floor (Provogue, 2016)

With Donny Hathaway

- Extension of a Man (Atco, 1973)

With Cissy Houston

- Cissy Houston (Private Stock, 1977)

With The Jacksons

- Destiny (Epic, 1978)

With Garland Jeffreys

- Ghost Writer (A&M, 1977)

With Rickie Lee Jones

- It's Like This (Artemis, 2000)

With Wynonna Judd

- Wynonna (Curb, 1992)

With Robin Kenyatta

- Gypsy Man (Atlantic, 1973)

With Chaka Khan

- Chaka (Warner Bros., 1978)

With Al Kooper

- Easy Does It (Columbia, 1970)

With Labelle

- Moon Shadow (Warner Bros., 1972)

With John Lennon

- Mind Games (Apple, 1973)

With Ralph MacDonald

- Sound of a Drum (Marlin Records, 1976)

With Herbie Mann

- Surprises (Atlantic, 1976)
- Brazil: Once Again (Atlantic, 1977)

With Eric Martin

- Eric Martin (Capitol, 1985)

With Don McLean

- Playin' Favorites (United Artists, 1973)

With Van McCoy

- Love Is the Answer (Avco, 1974)
- Disco Baby (Avco, 1975)
- The Disco Kid (Avco, 1975)

With Melanie

- Madrugada (Neighborhood, 1974)

With Bette Midler

- Bette Midler (Atlantic, 1973)
- Bathhouse Betty (Warner Bros., 1998)

With Roxy Music

- Avalon (EG Records, 1982)

With Randy Newman

- Little Criminals (Warner Bros., 1977)

With Juice Newton

- Dirty Looks (Capitol, 1983)

With Laura Nyro

- Smile (Columbia, 1976)

With The Oak Ridge Boys

- Monongahela (MCA, 1988)

With Yoko Ono

- A Story (Ryko disc, 1997)

With Dolly Parton

- Burlap & Satin (RCA, 1983)

With Annette Peacock

- I'm the One (RCA Victor, 1972)
- X-Dreams (Aura, 1978)

With The Pointer Sisters

- Priority (Planet, 1979)

With Bonnie Raitt

- The Glow (Warner Bros., 1979)

With Ray Repp

- Hear the Cryin (Myrrh, 1972)

With Linda Ronstadt

- Simple Dreams (Asylum, 1977)
- Get Closer (Asylum, 1982)

With Rosie

- Better Late Than Never (RCA Victor, 1976)

With Diana Ross

- Silk Electric (RCA, 1982)

With Boz Scaggs

- Middle Man (Columbia, 1980)

With Janis Siegel

- At Home (Atlantic, 1987)

With Carly Simon

- Hotcakes (Elektra, 1974)
- Spy (Elektra, 1979)
- Come Upstairs (Elektra, 1980)
- Torch (Warner Bros., 1981)
- Hello Big Man (Warner Bros., 1983)
- Letters Never Sent (Arista, 1994)
- This Kind of Love (Hear Music, 2008)
- Comes in Waves (Iris, 2026)

With Lucy Simon

- Lucy Simon (RCA Victor, 1975)

With Paul Simon

- There Goes Rhymin' Simon (Columbia, 1973)

With Phoebe Snow

- Against the Grain (Columbia Records, 1978)

With JD Souther

- You're Only Lonely (Columbia Records, 1979)

With Steely Dan

- The Royal Scam (ABC, 1976)
- Aja (ABC, 1977)
- Gaucho (MCA, 1980)

With Howard Tate

- Howard Tate (Atlantic, 1972)

With James Taylor

- Walking Man (Warner Bros., 1974)
- Dad Loves His Work (Columbia, 1981)

With Livingston Taylor

- Over the Rainbow (Capricorn, 1973)

With John Tropea

- Tropea (Video Arts, 1975)
- Short Trip to Space (Video Arts, 1977)
- Touch You Again (Video Arts, 1979)

With Libby Titus

- Libby Titus (Columbia, 1977)

With Frankie Valli

- Closeup (Private Stock, 1975)

With Joe Walsh

- The Confessor (Warner Bros., 1985)

With Larry Weiss

- Black & Blue Suite (20th Century Records, 1974)

With Paul Williams

- Just an Old Fashioned Love Song (A&M Records, 1971)

With Edgar Winter

- Jasmine Nightdreams (Blue Sky, 1975)

With Warren Zevon

- Excitable Boy (Asylum, 1978)
- Bad Luck Streak in Dancing School (Elektra, 1980)
- The Envoy (Asylum, 1982)
