= Thank You for Being a Friend =

1978 single by Andrew Gold

- Side label of U.S. 7-inch vinyl single

Single by Andrew Gold

from the album All This and Heaven Too
- B-side: "Still You Linger On"
- Released: February 1978
- Genre: Pop rock; soft rock
- Length: 3:58 (Single Edit); 4:41 (Album Version)
- Label: Asylum
- Songwriter: Andrew Gold
- Producers: Andrew Gold; Brock Walsh

Andrew Gold singles chronology
"I'm On My Way" (1978)	"Thank You for Being a Friend" (1978)	"Never Let Her Slip Away" (1978)

Music video
- "Thank You For Being A Friend" on YouTube

"Thank You for Being a Friend" is a song written and recorded by American singer Andrew Gold. It appears on Gold's third album All This and Heaven Too. The song reached number 25 on the US Billboard Hot 100 chart in 1978. On the Cash Box chart, "Thank You for Being a Friend" spent two weeks at number 11. A cover by Cindy Fee was the theme song for the NBC sitcom The Golden Girls.

== Overview ==
According to Gold, "Thank You for Being a Friend" was "just this little throwaway thing" that took him "about an hour to write".

== Personnel ==
- Andrew Gold – lead vocals, backing vocals, acoustic piano, synthesizers, percussion
- Waddy Wachtel – guitars
- Kenny Edwards – bass, backing vocals
- Jeff Porcaro – drums
- Brock Walsh – backing vocals

== Other versions ==
The song was recorded by Cindy Fee to serve as the theme song for the NBC sitcom The Golden Girls, and recorded again by former Three Dog Night co-frontman Chuck Negron for the series's CBS spin-off The Golden Palace.

Additionally, the song was featured as a dedication to the host on Casey Kasem's final American Top 20/10, broadcast on the Fourth of July weekend in 2009; it was Casey Kasem's final long distance dedication. at the end of two World Series games (Game 5 in 1988 and Game 4 in 1990); in the It's Always Sunny in Philadelphia episode "Mac's Mom Burns Her House Down"; at the end of Super Bowl XL; in the episode of The Simpsons titled "Double, Double, Boy in Trouble"; on episodes of the TV shows Dancing with the Stars, Family Guy, New Girl, Looking, Unbreakable Kimmy Schmidt, The Goldbergs, Arrested Development, Atlanta, The Boys and the TV special Trolls Holiday, as well as on a May 2010 episode of Saturday Night Live hosted by Golden Girls star Betty White, in which past and present cast members sang the song followed by a death metal version of the song performed by White while wearing a ski mask. Elaine Paige and Dionne Warwick released a recording of the song on Paige's duet album Elaine Paige and Friends in 2010. Other notables who covered the song include ex-Beatle Ringo Starr, whose unreleased recording of the composition was produced by longtime Andrew Gold confederate Peter Asher, and actress/singer Bernadette Peters, who used it to open her 1979 live video release Bernadette Peters In Concert.

The song was included in the Wearside Jack tape by someone purporting to be the Yorkshire Ripper; covered by ska-pop band Suburban Legends on their 2015 album Forever in the FriendZone, and reimagined by Virginia punk-rockers The Blanche Devereauxs on their 2009 LP Midnight Cheesecake Banter. It was also recorded by singer-songwriter and sometime Gold collaborator Stephen Bishop; ensembles such as the Starlite Singers, Wild Stylerz, Smooch, Bliss, The Blue Rubatos, and Micah's Rule; singers Alyssa Bonagura, Angela Galuppo, Valerie DeLaCruz, and Brynn Marie; and bandleader Brandon Schott, with instrumental interpretations by groups including the London Studio Orchestra, Orlando Pops Orchestra, the Twilight Trio, and the Instrumental All Stars with Dominic Kirwan.

Various iterations of the composition have also been used in a number of advertisements, including a commercial for the New York Lottery, a German ad for Toyota, a UK ad for KFC, a special one-off ad for Arby's to commemorate the end of Jon Stewart's run as host of TV's The Daily Show, a web ad for the Radio City Music Hall dance troupe the Rockettes, 2019 Campbells Soup Commercial, a Coffee Mate commercial, a Volkswagen advert in the UK in 2024/5, an IKEA advert in Australia in 2025, a 2013 Super Bowl ad for the National Football League, and in a trailer for the movie Deadpool 2, posted on lead actor Ryan Reynolds's Twitter account to thank fans for the box-office success of the superhero blockbuster.

The chorus of the song is sampled in Rachel Platten's song of the same name on the 2017 soundtrack album of My Little Pony: The Movie. In 2020, a version of the song was sung by Jane and Kat in The Bold Type, Season 4, Episode 16 "Not Far from the Tree".

In 2021 former AEW star CM Punk jokingly sang the song along with "Jungle Boy" Jack Perry and Luchasaurus on AEW Dark the day before AEW All Out.

In 2023, Tony Christie, along with Sting and Nile Rodgers, rerecorded the song as a charity single for Music for Dementia's campaign for Thank You Day.

The song is owned and managed by the estate of Andrew Gold and administered by Kobalt Music.

== Chart performance ==
=== Weekly charts ===
Chart (1978)	Peak position
Australian (Kent Music Report)	58
Canada RPM Top Singles	7
Canada RPM Adult Contemporary	5
UK Singles Chart	42
US Billboard Hot 100	25
US Billboard Hot Adult Contemporary Tracks	15
US Cash Box Top 100	11

=== Year-end charts ===
Chart (1978)	Rank
Canada RPM Top Singles	57
US Cash Box Top 100	98
