= Andrew Gold (album) =

Studio album by Andrew Gold
- Released: October 1975
- Recorded: The Sound Factory (Los Angeles, California).
- Genres: Pop, pop rock
- Length: 34:23
- Label: Asylum
- Producer: Chuck Plotkin

Andrew Gold chronology
Andrew Gold (1975)	What's Wrong with This Picture? (1976)

Andrew Gold is the first album by singer-songwriter Andrew Gold. It was released in October 1975 on Asylum Records. Linda Ronstadt, of whose band Gold was a member at the time, appears on the album.

== Reception ==
Professional ratings
Review scores
Source	Rating
AllMusic	4/5 stars
The Virgin Encyclopedia Of Popular Music	3/5 stars

Rolling Stone's Stephen Holder said the album was "one of the year's most melodic" and "expresses, with warmth, humor and expertise, a special feeling for mid-Sixties rock." Holder notes that Gold "recaptures the essential spirit of 1964-65 Beatles music" and that his "ballads are as captivating as his rockers, if not more so."

AllMusic's James Chrispell retrospectively said the album contains "[a]n abundance of riches." Noting "[t]here are great Beatlesque melodies here, as well as heartfelt love songs that are Gold's specialties."

== Covers ==
Leo Sayer covered "Endless Flight" on his 1976 Endless Flight album.

== Track listing ==
All songs written by Andrew Gold, except where noted.

No.	Title	Writer(s)	Length
1.	"That's Why I Love You"	Gold, Gene Garfin	3:11
2.	"Heartaches in Heartaches"		3:18
3.	"Love Hurts"		3:47
4.	"A Note from You"		2:48
5.	"Resting in Your Arms"		3:14
6.	"I'm a Gambler"		2:27
7.	"Endless Flight"		4:59
8.	"Hang My Picture Straight"		3:24
9.	"Ten Years Behind Me"		4:04
10.	"I'm Coming Home"		3:11

Bonus Tracks (Rhino/Edsel CD release)
No.	Title	Length
1.	"Within a Word"	2:03
2.	"Sometime When a Man's on His Own"	2:47
3.	"Broken Pin Ball Machine"	3:15
4.	"To Be Someone"	4:17
5.	"Ten Years Behind Me" (demo)	4:08
6.	"Hang My Picture Straight" (live at the Santa Monica Civic Auditorium, 1975)	3:07

== Personnel ==
- Andrew Gold – vocals, electric piano (1), guitars (1–8, 10), bass (1, 3, 4, 8, 10), drums (1, 3, 4, 8, 10), percussion (1–8, 10), acoustic piano (2, 3, 4, 7, 8, 9), organ (3), marxophone (9)
- Dan Dugmore – pedal steel guitar (7)
- Kenny Edwards – backing vocals (1–6, 10), bass (2, 6, 7), lead guitar (5)
- Peter Bernstein – bass (5)
- Mike Botts – drums (2)
- Gene Garfin – backing vocals (1, 5, 10), drums (5)
- David Kemper – drums (6, 7)
- Bobby Keys – saxophones (4)
- Trevor Lawrence – saxophones (4)
- David Campbell – string arrangements and conductor
- Don Francisco – backing vocals (1, 4)
- Linda Ronstadt – backing vocals (2, 3)

Production

- Chuck Plotkin – producer
- Val Garay – engineer
- Michael Boshears – recording
- Jeff Hawks – assistant engineer
- Doug Sax – mastering
- The Mastering Lab (Hollywood, California) – mastering location
- Glen Christensen – art direction
- Tommy Steele – design
- Bill Imhoff – illustration
- Ken McGowan – photography

== Charts ==
The single "That's Why I Love You" spent 5 weeks on the Billboard Hot 100 beginning in January 1976, peaking at No. 68.
