= What's Wrong with This Picture? (Andrew Gold album) =

Studio album by Andrew Gold
- Released: December 1976
- Studio: Sound Factory (Hollywood)
- Genre: Pop, pop rock
- Length: 41:30
- Label: Asylum
- Producer: Peter Asher

Andrew Gold chronology
Andrew Gold (1975)	What's Wrong with This Picture? (1976)	All This and Heaven Too (1978)

What's Wrong with This Picture? is the second album by the singer-songwriter Andrew Gold. It was released in December 1976 on Asylum Records. It includes the hit single "Lonely Boy", which peaked at No. 7 on the Billboard singles chart and featured Linda Ronstadt on backing vocals.

The album's artwork reflects its title, mimicking a style of visual puzzle that consists of various logical inconsistencies or paradoxes for the viewer to try to identify. One example is the view of the sea through the windows of the room, which are at different levels from one another.

== Reception ==
Professional ratings
Review scores
Source	Rating
AllMusic	4/5 stars
Christgau's Record Guide	C−
The Virgin Encyclopedia Of Popular Music	2/5 stars

AllMusic's James Chrispell retrospectively said the album "continued in the same vein as Andrew Gold's first release" and concluded "sophomore jinx aside, this is a very satisfying album."

Rolling Stone's Ken Tucker called the album "a disappointment" in light of the "fast, smart pop songs" on Gold's first album. He stated that while "Gold's guitar playing remains commanding… inventive and moving" it cannot overcome "the weakness of the material".

== Track listing ==
All songs written by Andrew Gold, except where noted.

Side 1
No.	Title	Writer(s)	Length
1.	"Hope You Feel Good"	Gold, Steve Ferguson	4:49
2.	"Passing Thing"		4:08
3.	"Do Wah Diddy"	Jeff Barry, Ellie Greenwich	2:52
4.	"Learning the Game"	Buddy Holly	4:08
5.	"Angel Woman"		1:38
6.	"Must Be Crazy"		4:13

Side 2
No.	Title	Writer(s)	Length
1.	"Lonely Boy"		4:24
2.	"Firefly"		3:23
3.	"Stay"	Maurice Williams	4:45
4.	"Go Back Home Again"		3:10
5.	"One of Them Is Me"		4:00

Bonus Tracks (Rhino/Edsel CD release)
No.	Title	Writer(s)	Length
1.	"Lonely Boy" (original version)		4:22
2.	"Firefly" (outtake)		3:13
3.	"Gorilla Jam"	Gold, Kenny Edwards, Mike Botts	1:20
4.	"Feel It"		4:20
5.	"Hope You Feel Good" (live at the Universal Amphitheatre, Los Angeles, 1976)	Gold, Steve Ferguson	4:47

== Charts ==
Chart (1977)	Peak position
Australian (Kent Music Report)	89

== Personnel ==
- Andrew Gold – vocals, acoustic guitar (8, 9), electric guitar (3, 8, 9, 10), piano (1, 2, 4, 5, 6, 7, 9, 10), electric piano (11), drums (8), bass guitar (8), organ (6, 9), ARP (8), tambourine (1, 4, 6, 10) congas (10), shaker (1), recorder (1), tom tom (10), percussion (8, 9), cowbell (7), backing vocals (3, 6, 8, 9, 11)
- Kenny Edwards – bass guitar (1, 7, 9, 10, 11), mandolin (4), backing vocals (1, 3, 4, 6, 9, 10, 11)
- Brock Walsh – backing vocals (1, 2, 3, 4, 10, 11), electric piano (7), acoustic guitar (11), ARP (4, 7)
- Dan Dugmore – steel guitar (4, 11), rhythm guitar (7, 9, 10)
- Mike Botts – drums (4, 7, 10, 11), sleigh bells (7)
- Peter Asher – backing vocals (3, 9), claves (9), tambourine (11), shaker (11)
- Waddy Wachtel – guitar (1, 7, 11) bass guitar (4)
- Leland Sklar – bass guitar (2, 3, 6)
- Russ Kunkel – drums (1, 2, 3, 6)
- Danny Kortchmar – rhythm guitar (3) electric guitar (4)
- Linda Ronstadt – backing vocals (7, 9)
- Tessie Coen – congas (6, 9)
- Don Menza – saxophone (6), shakuhachi (2)
- Clarence McDonald – electric piano (9)
- Val Garay – backing vocals (3)

Production

- Peter Asher – producer
- Val Garay – engineer
- Greg Ladanyi, Dennis Kirk – assistant engineer
