= Andrew Gold (journalist) =

British journalist (born 1989)

- Gold in 2025
- Born: Andrew David Gold; 21 March 1989 (age 37); Watford, Hertfordshire, England
- Education: University of Leeds (BA)
- Occupations: Journalist, YouTuber, filmmaker, author, podcaster
- Known for: YouTube

YouTube information
- Channel: Andrew Gold
- Years active: 2023–present
- Genres: Political commentary; social commentary
- Subscribers: 900,000
- Views: 119 million
- Last updated: July 10, 2026
- Website: andrewgoldheretics.com

Andrew David Gold (born 21 March 1989) is a British journalist, YouTuber, filmmaker, author and podcaster.

== Early life ==
Gold was born in Watford at Watford General Hospital on March 21, 1989. Gold and his family moved to Carpenders Park after nine years of living in Elstree. He attended St John's School, Merchant Taylor's and later studied English literature at the University of Leeds. Gold is Jewish. His father legally changed the family surname from Goldstein to Gold, hoping to avoid antisemitism.

One of Gold's first jobs out of university that spurred his interest in filmmaking was working at the online division of The Sun. A fan of filmmaker Louis Theroux, Gold persuaded a Sun junior editor to use one of the publication's cameras to film Gold walking through Covent Garden with the subject of the video being how easy it was to get a date on Valentine's Day.

Gold speaks five languages, including French, Spanish, Portuguese and German, following stints in France, Colombia, Brazil and Germany. He is a fan of the English football club Tottenham Hotspur F.C., and has described himself as "an atheist Jew."

== Journalism ==
Gold has written for such publications as UnHerd, Vice, Jewish News, HuffPost and the BBC.

== Filmmaking ==
Gold's documentaries have been broadcast on networks such as HBO and the BBC.

In 2018, Gold produced his first BBC documentary, Exorcism: The Battle for Young Minds, after spending nearly six years in Argentina.

== YouTube career ==
In 2023, Gold launched his YouTube podcast entitled, Heretics. Gold has stated his motivation for creating Heretics came from rejection by fifty production companies.

== Media ==
In 2023, Gold was interviewed for The Atlantic by Helen Lewis who had been a guest on Gold's podcast; the episode was demonitized for violating YouTube's policies. Gold was critical of YouTube's demonetization policy.

In 2024, Gold's non-fiction book The Psychology of Secrets: My Adventures with Murderers, Cults and Influencers was published by Pan Macmillan.

In 2026, Gold debated with far-right activist Steve Laws, whom Gold described as "Britain's biggest racist".
