= Never Let Her Slip Away =

1978 single by Andrew Gold

- US and UK vinyl single

Single by Andrew Gold

from the album All This and Heaven Too
- B-side: "Genevieve"
- Released: March 1978 (UK); June 1978 (US)
- Length: 3:23
- Label: Asylum
- Songwriter: Andrew Gold
- Producers: Andrew Gold; Brock Walsh

Andrew Gold singles chronology
"Thank You for Being a Friend" (1978)	"Never Let Her Slip Away" (1978)	"Kiss This One Goodbye" (1979)

Official music video
- "Never Let Her Slip Away" on YouTube

"Never Let Her Slip Away" is a song written by American musician Andrew Gold, who recorded it for his third studio album, All This and Heaven Too (1978). The single was produced by Andrew Gold and Brock Walsh, and reached number five on the UK Singles Chart and number 67 on the Billboard Hot 100 in 1978. Queen frontman Freddie Mercury contributed harmony vocals to the song, as an uncredited background singer.

A 1992 cover version by British dance outfit Undercover was also an international hit.

== Background ==
As revealed in his liner notes for All This and Heaven Too, Gold wrote "Never Let Her Slip Away" about meeting actress and Saturday Night Live cast member Laraine Newman, who was his girlfriend when he composed the song. Background vocals were provided by JD Souther, Timothy B. Schmit, Brock Walsh and an uncredited Freddie Mercury.

The song is owned and managed by the estate of Andrew Gold and administered by Kobalt Music.

== Music video ==
A music video was recorded and released for the song featuring Gold, Stan Kipper, Brian Garafalo, and George Marinelli, all facing each other, clapping along with the beat of the song as the camera pans around them. Brock Walsh also appears miming to the saxophone solo.

== Personnel ==
- Andrew Gold – lead and backing vocals, synthesizer, percussion
- Ernie Watts – saxophone
- Timothy B. Schmit – backing vocals
- JD Souther – backing vocals
- Brock Walsh – percussion, backing vocals
- Freddie Mercury - backing vocals (uncredited)

== In popular culture ==
In 1995, British comedians Vic Reeves and Bob Mortimer performed a cover of the song on their show The Smell of Reeves and Mortimer. "Never Let Her Slip Away" was also featured on the soundtrack of the film Alan Partridge: Alpha Papa (2013), as a personal favourite of the principal character.

In conversation on the podcast WTF with Marc Maron, Dave Grohl of the rock band Foo Fighters called "Never Let Her Slip Away" "the most beautiful piece of music ever written," and "maybe one of the most melodically sophisticated songs I've ever heard in my entire life," and noted his plans to record a cover version of the song.

== Charts ==
=== Weekly charts ===
Chart (1978)	Peak position
Australia (Kent Music Report)	55
Canada Top Singles (RPM)	60
Canada Adult Contemporary (RPM)	17
Belgium (Ultratop 50 Flanders)	14
Ireland (IRMA)	2
Netherlands (Dutch Top 40)	15
Netherlands (Single Top 100)	23
UK Singles (OCC)	5
US Billboard Hot 100	67
US Easy Listening (Billboard)	16

=== Year-end charts ===
Chart (1978)	Position
UK	39
US	343

== Undercover version ==
"Never Let Her Slip Away"

Single by Undercover

from the album Check Out the Groove
- Released: November 2, 1992
- Genre: Dance
- Length: 3:28
- Label: PWL International
- Songwriter: Andrew Gold
- Producer: Steve Mac

Undercover singles chronology
"Baker Street" (1992)	"Never Let Her Slip Away" (1992)	"I Wanna Stay with You" (1993)

Music video
- "Never Let Her Slip Away" on YouTube

British dance group Undercover covered the song on their debut album, Check Out the Groove (1992). This version was released in November 1992 by PWL International and produced by Steve Mac. It also reached number five in the United Kingdom and number two in Ireland, as Gold's original did. In addition to this, it reached number three in Belgium, number four in Finland and number seven in the Netherlands. On the Eurochart Hot 100, the track peaked at number 11 in December 1992.

=== Critical reception ===
British Lennox Herald named the song a stand out from the Check Out the Groove album. Pan-European magazine Music & Media wrote, "Once again Undercover has hit a goldmine with a cover of a '70s singer/songwriter's work. This time it's the Andrew Gold 1978 classic. The crucial difference is that this is more beaty." Alan Jones from Music Week gave it a score of four out of five, noting that "already achieving a surprisingly major degree of club crossover, it's very much in the KWS/East Side Beat mould, and could even reach the very summit." Mark Frith from Smash Hits also gave it four out of five, writing that "Undercover bloke John Matthews was born to make this record." He described it as a "gorgeous, poignant ballad that suits him down to the ground."

=== Track listing ===
- CD single
1. "Never Let Her Slip Away" (Essential Edit) – 3:28
2. "Never Let Her Slip Away" (Essential Mix) – 4:59
3. "Sha Do" (Extended Mix) – 5:41

=== Charts ===
==== Weekly charts ====
Chart (1992–1993)	Peak position
Australia (ARIA)	170
Austria (Ö3 Austria Top 40)	23
Belgium (Ultratop 50 Flanders)	3
Denmark (IFPI)	8
Europe (Eurochart Hot 100)	11
Europe (European Dance Radio)	7
Finland (Suomen virallinen lista)	4
Germany (GfK)	16
Ireland (IRMA)	2
Israel (Israeli Singles Chart)	9
Netherlands (Dutch Top 40)	7
Netherlands (Single Top 100)	8
Portugal (AFP)	9
Sweden (Sverigetopplistan)	23
UK Singles (Official Charts)	5
UK Airplay (Music Week)	4
UK Dance (Music Week)	4
UK Club Chart (Music Week)	18

==== Year-end charts ====
Chart (1992)	Position
UK Singles (OCC)	49

Chart (1993)	Position
Belgium (Ultratop)	54
Germany (Media Control)	85
Netherlands (Dutch Top 40)	125

=== Release history ===
Region	Date	Format(s)	Label(s)	Ref.
United Kingdom	November 2, 1992	7-inch vinyl; 12-inch vinyl; CD; cassette	PWL International	
Australia	January 18, 1993	CD; cassette	PWL International	
Japan	February 25, 1993	Mini-CD	WEA Music K.K.; 380	
