= Andrew Gold =

American musician and producer (1951–2011)

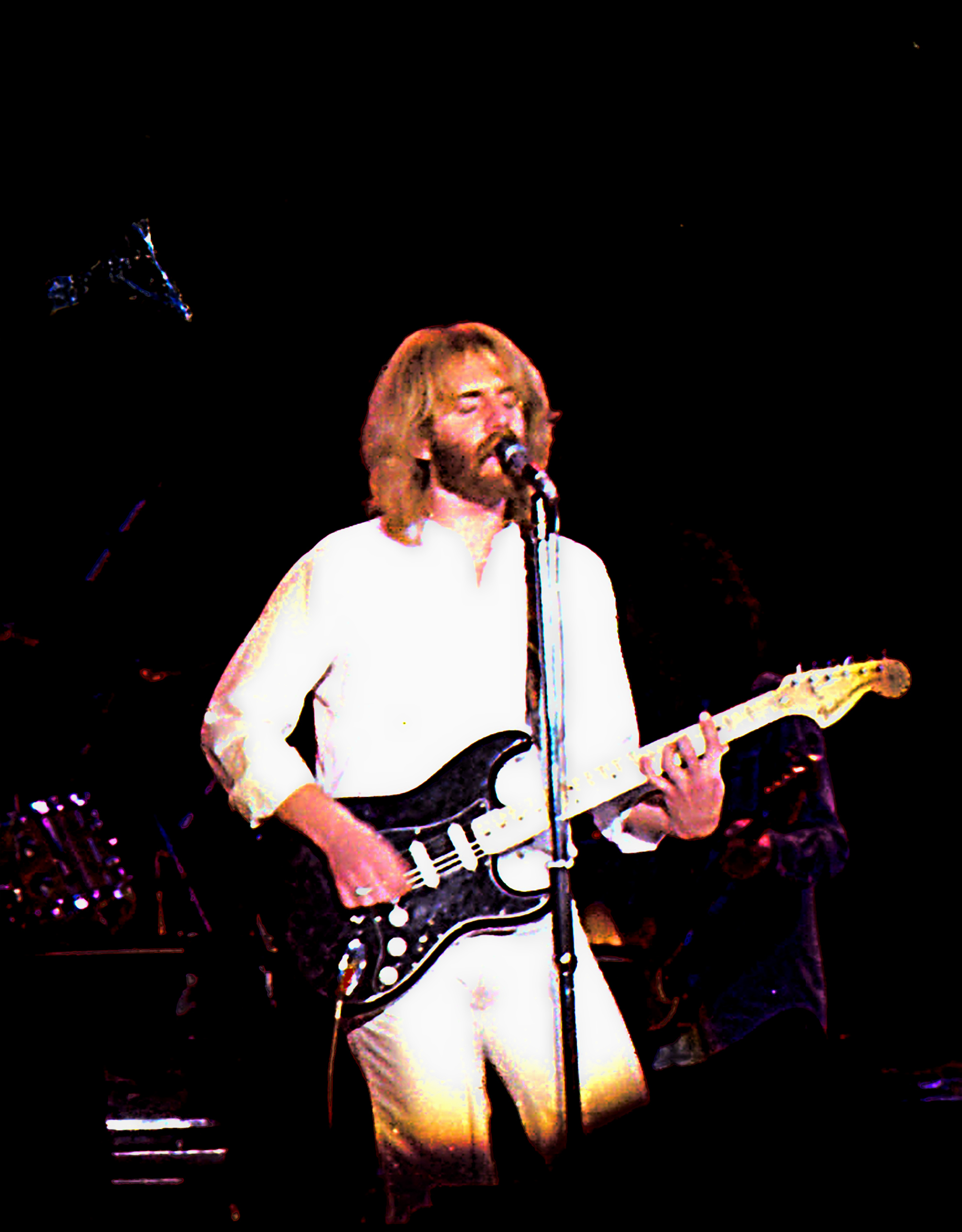
- Gold performing in 1980

Background information
- Born: Andrew Maurice Gold; August 2, 1951; Burbank, California, U.S.
- Died: June 3, 2011 (aged 59) Los Angeles, California, U.S.
- Genres: Pop; pop rock; soft rock
- Occupations: Musician; singer-songwriter; music producer
- Instruments: Vocals; keyboards; guitar; drums
- Years active: 1967–2011
- Label: Asylum
- Formerly of: Bryndle; Wax
- Website: andrewgold.com

Andrew Maurice Gold (August 2, 1951 – June 3, 2011) was an American multi-instrumentalist, singer, songwriter, and record producer who influenced much of the Los Angeles-dominated pop/soft rock sound in the 1970s. Gold performed on scores of records by other artists, especially Linda Ronstadt, and had his own success with the U.S. top 40 hits "Lonely Boy" (1977) and "Thank You for Being a Friend" (1978), as well as the UK top five hit "Never Let Her Slip Away" (1978). In the 1980s, he had further international chart success as one half of the British-American superduo Wax alongside 10cc's Graham Gouldman.

Gold was a multi-instrumentalist who played guitar, bass, keyboards, accordion, synthesizer, harmonica, saxophone, flute, drums and percussion, and more arcane musical instruments such as ukulele, musette, and harmonium. He was also a producer, sound engineer, film composer, session musician, actor, and painter.

Gold produced, composed, performed on, and wrote tracks for films, commercials, and television soundtracks. Some of his older works experienced newfound popularity in the '80s and '90s: "Thank You for Being a Friend" sung by Cindy Fee was used as the opening theme for The Golden Girls in 1985. He performed "Final Frontier", the opening theme of the sitcom Mad About You, which debuted in 1992. The children's novelty song "Spooky, Scary Skeletons" (1996) became an Internet meme in the 2010s. In 1997, Gold released a tribute to 1960s psychedelic music, Greetings from Planet Love, issued under the pseudonym "the Fraternal Order of the All".

== Early life ==
Gold was born on August 2, 1951, in Burbank, California, and eventually followed his parents into show business. His mother was singer Marni Nixon, who provided the singing voice for numerous actresses, notably Natalie Wood in West Side Story, Deborah Kerr in The King and I, and Audrey Hepburn in My Fair Lady; his father was Ernest Gold, an Austrian-born composer who won an Academy Award for his score for the movie Exodus. He had two younger sisters.

Gold began writing songs at the age of 13. While in school in the United Kingdom for one year, the 16-year-old Gold scored his first recording contract on the strength of a selection of demos he submitted to Polydor Records' London office. That contract resulted in the single "Of All the Little Girls", which was recorded with his friend and collaborator Charlie Villiers, and released in 1967 under the name Villiers and Gold.

== Career ==
=== 1970s ===
By the early 1970s, Gold was working full-time as a musician, songwriter and record producer. In the 1970s he joined the Floating House Band, along with former Stone Poney members Bobby Kimmel and Shep Cooke. Gold was a member of the Los Angeles band Bryndle, alongside Kenny Edwards, Wendy Waldman, and Karla Bonoff, releasing the single "Woke Up This Morning" in 1970. He played a major role as multi-instrumentalist and arranger for Linda Ronstadt's breakthrough album, 1974's Heart Like a Wheel, and her next two albums.

After Ronstadt's Hasten Down the Wind, Gold began a solo career. Among other accomplishments, he played the majority of instruments on "You're No Good", Ronstadt's only No. 1 single on the Billboard Hot 100, and on "When Will I Be Loved", "(Love Is Like a) Heat Wave", and many other hits. He was in her band from 1973 until 1977, and then sporadically throughout the 1980s and 1990s, performing at some of her concerts.

In 1975, Gold debuted as a solo artist with the album Andrew Gold and played most of the instruments on Art Garfunkel's solo hit "I Only Have Eyes For You" (a major hit in the United Kingdom where it topped the UK Singles Chart), as well as several other cuts on Garfunkel's album Breakaway.

Gold's second studio album, What's Wrong with This Picture? was released in 1976 and featured the hit single "Lonely Boy", which reached No. 7 on the Billboard Hot 100 in June 1977. Although Gold put personal references in the lyrics to "Lonely Boy" (including his year of birth), he said in an interview with author Spencer Leigh that the song was not autobiographical. "Maybe it was a mistake to do that," he said, "but I simply put in those details because it was convenient. I hadn't been a lonely boy at all – I'd had a very happy childhood."

In 1977, Gold played guitar on two cuts of Eric Carmen's album Boats Against the Current, including "She Did It", a No. 23 hit that year.

Although "Lonely Boy" was the bigger radio hit in the States, the single "Thank You for Being a Friend" from Gold's third album, All This and Heaven Too, peaked at No. 25 in 1978, later gaining popularity as the theme song for The Golden Girls, performed by Cindy Fee.

Gold's biggest hit in the United Kingdom was "Never Let Her Slip Away", which peaked at #5 on the UK Singles Chart on two occasions, first by Gold himself in 1978 and again by dance-pop group Undercover in 1992. Freddie Mercury, a friend of Gold's, was an uncredited background singer.

Gold also toured with the Eagles, worked in the studio and toured with Ronstadt and Jackson Browne, recorded and toured with James Taylor, and was second engineer on part of Joni Mitchell's album Blue.

=== 1980s ===
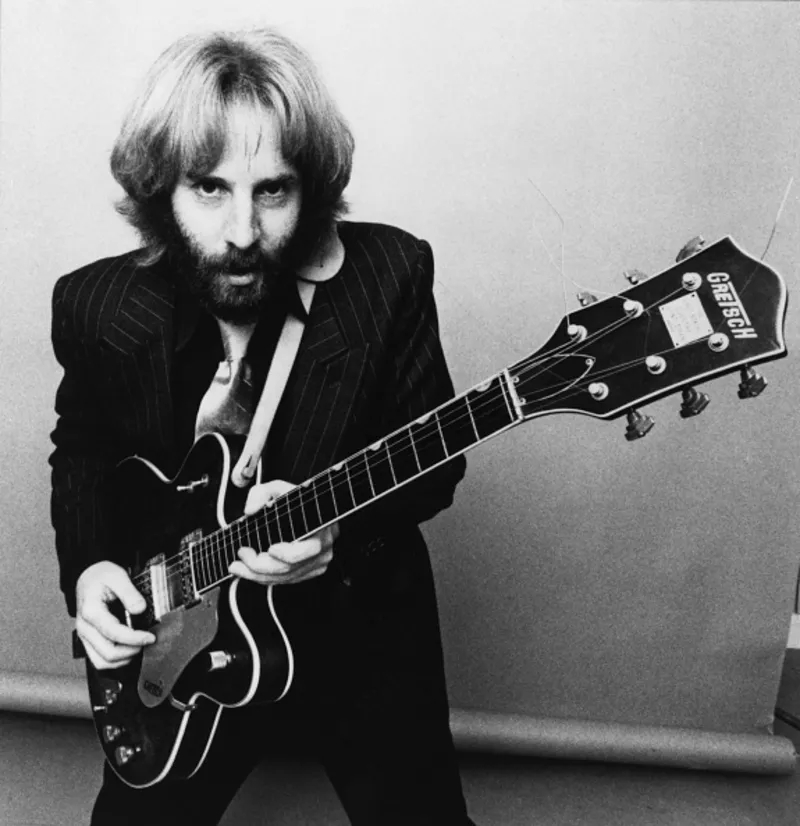
Gold in a promotional picture, 1980

Gold played on Cher's hit 1989 album Heart of Stone and, during the early '90s, wrote and composed hits for Trisha Yearwood as well as Wynonna Judd, for whom he co-wrote the No. 1 single "I Saw the Light" with Lisa Angelle. (Later, Gold would produce Angelle on her own album, which featured a number of songs on whose authorship and composition they collaborated.) He also produced singles for Vince Gill, wrote and produced tracks for Celine Dion, and arranged a cover of the Everly Brothers hit "All I Have to Do Is Dream" that was sung by stars Jeff Bridges and Karen Allen in the 1984 science-fiction film Starman.

==== Wax ====
In 1981, Gold produced, co-wrote, sang and played on three 10cc tracks that appeared on the hit-making pop-rock band's 1981 album Ten Out of 10. Subsequently, Eric Stewart and Graham Gouldman of 10cc invited Gold to become a member of the group. Although he had worked with them in the studio, business conflicts prevented him from joining their ranks.

In late 1983, 10cc broke up, and in the aftermath, Gold and Gouldman formed Wax. Wax recorded and toured for five years. They enjoyed international success, particularly in the UK, where the duo had several hits including "Right Between the Eyes" and their biggest hit, "Bridge to Your Heart". Wax broke up as a recording and touring entity in 1989, but Gold and Gouldman continued to write and record together whenever possible.

=== 1990s ===
In the 1990s, Gold once again joined forces with ex-bandmates Karla Bonoff, Wendy Waldman and Kenny Edwards to re-form Bryndle and release their first full-length album, Bryndle.

In 1996, Gold left Bryndle and released the children's Halloween-oriented novelty album Halloween Howls. It features covers of "Monster Mash" and the themes from The Addams Family and Ghostbusters, plus nine original songs, including "Spooky, Scary Skeletons", which regained popularity from the 2010s onwards as an Internet meme. The same year, he released the solo album ....Since 1951, and produced Stephen Bishop's Blue Guitar album. Thereafter, he recorded the psychedelic '60s tribute album Greetings from Planet Love under the pseudonym "The Fraternal Order of the All," releasing it on his own record label, "QBrain Records." This album was a multi-tracked solo affair with Gold essentially playing all of the instruments and singing all of the vocals on original songs in the style of Gold's favorite 1960s bands such as The Beatles, The Byrds and The Beach Boys.

He produced, composed, and/or wrote tracks for numerous films, such as the comedy Rectuma from director Mark Pirro, and contributed songs to many television soundtracks and commercials. Among his more high-profile gigs, he sang "Final Frontier," the theme song for the television sitcom Mad About You. In a remarkable turn of events, his rendition of the song was used as the wake-up call for the Mars Pathfinder space probe in 1996.

Gold also produced seven albums for Japanese singer-songwriter Eikichi Yazawa.

=== 2000s ===
In 2000, Gold compiled a Wax rarities album, Bikini Wax, as well as recording and releasing a new solo album The Spence Manor Suite; this last was followed in 2002 by another solo collection, Intermission. In the early 2000s, he formed a Byrds tribute band, Byrds of a Feather, which performed in the Los Angeles area.

He appeared in a 2006 concert with the classic rock group America and singer-songwriter Stephen Bishop. The performance was later released as a DVD titled America And Friends – Live at the Ventura Theater. The show featured Gold performing "Thank You for Being a Friend," "Final Frontier," "Bridge to Your Heart," and "Lonely Boy," as well as accompanying America and Bishop on guitar and vocals. Gold had produced America's Holiday Harmony Christmas album in 2002, in which he also played most of the instruments and co-wrote the track "Christmas in California."

== Legacy ==
Gold's song "Spooky Scary Skeletons" became a viral phenomenon, with numerous highly viewed remixes and dance tutorials for it being posted on YouTube; it was described by New York magazine in 2019 as the "Internet's Halloween anthem". YouTuber Dave Wave released a popular remix of the song that was later published on Spotify by Craft Recordings. The song also became highly popular on social media site TikTok, with videos including it receiving several hundred million views. By 2019, the popularity of "Spooky Scary Skeletons" had inspired a deluxe digital release of Halloween Howls. This version of the album included the addition of two extended electronic dance remixes of "Spooky Scary Skeletons." The song's lyrics were adapted into a children's picture book by Random House Children's Books in 2024.

In 2020, an early version of Gold's song "Savannah" was issued as a digital single. It was followed by Something New: Unreleased Gold – a posthumous compilation album of previously unavailable tracks, including some demos – in vinyl, CD and digital formats, along with two digital singles from the album: the title song and "Come Down to Me."

The catalog of Andrew's songs is administered by Kobalt Music Group.

== Personal life and death ==
Gold's first marriage was to Vanessa Gold, with whom he had three daughters, Emily, Victoria, and Olivia. Emily is also a musician and fronts the Los Angeles rock band Cosmo Gold. In the early 1980s, Gold was engaged to singer Nicolette Larson, but the engagement ended shortly after the completion of Larson's 1982 album All Dressed Up and No Place to Go, which Gold produced. Gold was also involved with Laraine Newman while she was on SNL in the late 1970s; he wrote the song "Never Let Her Slip Away" from his album All This and Heaven Too for her. He later married Leslie Kogan, who continues to manage his musical legacy.

Gold was diagnosed with kidney cancer and responded well to treatment. However, on June 3, 2011, he died in his sleep from heart failure, aged 59.

== Discography ==
=== Albums ===
==== Studio albums ====
Year	Title	Peak chart positions				Certifications
Year	Title	US	AUS	CAN	UK	Certifications
1975	Andrew Gold	190	—	—	—	
1976	What's Wrong with This Picture?	95	89	—	—	
1978	All This and Heaven Too	81	83	—	31	BPI: Silver
1980	Whirlwind	—	—	—	—	
1996	Andrew Gold's Halloween Howls	83	—	58	—	
1996	...Since 1951	—	—	—	—	
1997	Greetings from Planet Love (as The Fraternal Order of the All)	—	—	—	—	
1999	Warm Breezes	—	—	—	—	
2000	The Spence Manor Suite	—	—	—	—	
2002	Intermission	—	—	—	—	
2008	Copy Cat	—	—	—	—	
"—" denotes releases that did not chart or were not released in that territory.

==== Compilations ====
- 1978: An Interview with Andrew Gold (promo-only interview & music LP)
- 1991: Where the Heart Is: The Commercials 1988–1991
- 1997: Thank You for Being a Friend: The Best of Andrew Gold
- 1998: Leftovers
- 2011: The Essential Collection
- 2018: An Introduction to: Andrew Gold
- 2019: Complete Albums 1975–1980 (Digital)
- 2019: Lonely Boy: The Greatest Hits (Digital)
- 2019: Halloween Howls: Fun & Scary Music (Deluxe Edition Digital)
- 2020: Something New: Unreleased Gold
- 2021: Halloween Howls: Fun & Scary Music (Vinyl)
- 2023: Greetings from Planet Love - The Fraternal Order of the All (Vinyl Digital CD remastered)
- 2023 Halloween Howls: Fun & Scary Music (Vinyl, CD)
- 2025 Halloween Howls: Fun & Scary Music (Vinyl, CD)
- 2026 Halloween Howls: Fun & Scary Music (Vinyl Orange)

==== Live albums and EPs ====
- 2005: Rhino Hi-Five: Andrew Gold
- 2007: Andrew Gold – Live at the Ventura Theater (Digital EP)
- 2015: The Late Show – Live 1978
- 2019: Merry Christmas: Thank You for Being a Friend (Digital EP)
- 2020: Something New: The Solo Demos (Digital EP)

==== Box sets ====
- 2013: Andrew Gold + What's Wrong with This Picture + All This and Heaven Too + Whirlwind...Plus
- 2020: Lonely Boy: The Asylum Years Anthology
- 2026: Lonely Boy: The Asylum Years Anthology - Clam box

==== With Wax ====
- 1986: Magnetic Heaven
- 1987: American English
- 1989: A Hundred Thousand in Fresh Notes
- 1998: Common Knowledge.com
- 2019: Wax Live in Concert 1987

==== With Bryndle ====
- 1995: Bryndle
- 2002: House of Silence

=== Singles ===
Year	Title	Peak chart positions								Certifications	Album
Year	Title	US	US AC	AUS	CAN	CAN AC	IRE	NZ	UK	Certifications	Album
1968	"Of All the Little Girls" (UK release – with the duo Villiers & Gold)	—	—	—	—	—	—	―	—		Non-album singles
1970	"Woke Up This Morning" (with the band Bryndle)	—	—	—	—	—	—	―	—		Non-album singles
1975	"Heartaches in Heartaches"	—	—	—	—	—	—	―	—		Andrew Gold
1975	"That's Why I Love You"	68	—	96	—	—	―	—	―		Andrew Gold
1976	"Stay"	—	—	—	—	—	—	―	—		What's Wrong with This Picture?
1976	"Do Wah Diddy"	—	—	—	—	—	—	―	—		What's Wrong with This Picture?
1976	"One of Them Is Me"	—	—	—	—	—	—	―	—		What's Wrong with This Picture?
1977	"Lonely Boy"	7	38	32	7	25	—	40	11		What's Wrong with This Picture?
1977	"Go Back Home Again"	—	—	—	—	—	—	―	—		What's Wrong with This Picture?
1978	"I'm on My Way"	—	—	—	—	—	—	―	—		All This and Heaven Too
1978	"Thank You for Being a Friend"	25	15	58	7	5	—	—	42		All This and Heaven Too
1978	"Never Let Her Slip Away"	67	16	55	60	17	2	—	5	BPI: Silver	All This and Heaven Too
1978	"How Can This Be Love"	—	—	—	—	—	16	―	19		All This and Heaven Too
1980	"Kiss This One Goodbye"	—	—	—	—	—	—	―	—		Whirlwind
1980	"Stranded on the Edge"	—	—	—	—	—	—	―	—		Whirlwind
1980	"Nine to Five" (UK release)	—	—	—	—	—	—	―	—		Whirlwind
1989	"Pal O' Mine"	—	—	—	—	—	—	―	—		Non-album singles
1989	"Makin' Friends" (CD single)	—	—	—	—	—	—	―	—		Non-album singles
1996	"Spooky Scary Skeletons" (CD single)	35	—	—	22	—	35	―	55	RIAA: Platinum; BPI: Silver	Andrew Gold's Halloween Howls
2000	"Nowhere Now" (CD single)	—	—	—	—	—	—	―	—		Non-album single
2000	"Sorry to Let You Down" (CD single)	—	—	—	—	—	—	―	—		The Spence Manor Suite
"—" denotes releases that did not chart or were not released in that territory.

=== Other appearances ===
==== With other artists ====
Year	Artist	Album or single	Label	Role
1971	Joni Mitchell	Blue	Reprise	Second Engineer
1973	Brothers	Rainbow Rider	Columbia	Guitar Percussion
1973	Maria Muldaur	Maria Muldar	Warner Bros	Acoustic Guitar
1973	Rod Taylor	Rod Taylor	Asylum	Guitar, accordion
1973	Wendy Waldman	Love Has Got Me	Warner Bros	Guitar, electric piano, background vocals.
1974	Rita Coolidge	Fall Into Spring	A&M	Guitar, keyboards, percussion, background vocals
1974	Michael Diner	The Great Pretender	Fantasy	Piano
1974	Linda Ronstadt	Heart Like a Wheel	Capitol	Electric piano, guitar/electric guitar (solo), tambourine, drums, percussion, arrangements, keyboards, vocals
1975	Wendy Waldman	Gypsy Symphony	Warner Bros	Arrangements
1975	Art Garfunkel	Breakaway	Columbia	Electric and Acoustic guitars, ukulele, electric piano, drums
1975	Kate & Anna McGarrigle	Kate &Anna McGarrigle	Warner Bros	Guitar
1975	Danny O'Keefe	So Long Harry Truman	Atlantic	Piano
1975	Linda Ronstadt	Prisoner in Disguise	Asylum	Electric/acoustic guitars, musette, organ, piano, electric piano, ARP string ensemble, clavichord, tambourine, congos, drum, percussion, vocals
1975	Carly Simon	The Best of Carly Simon	Elektra	Guitar
1975	Carly Simon	Playing Possum	Elektra	Guitar, drums, tambourine
1975	Randy Edelman	Fairwell Fairbanks	Elektra	Electric guitar
1976	Barbi Benton	Something New	Playboy Records	Acoustic guitar, acoustic piano, tambourine, background vocals
1976	Stephen Bishop	Careless	MCA	Electric guitar
1976	Tom Pacheco	Swallowed Up in the Great American Heartland	RCA	Background vocals
1976	Linda Ronstadt	Hasten Down the Wind	Asylum	Electric/acoustic guitars, organ, acoustic/electric piano, keyboards, ARP string ens., clavinet, clavichord, musette, finger cymbals, sleigh bells, vocals, writer
1976	Linda Ronstadt	Greatest Hits Vol 1	Asylum	Electric and acoustic guitars, electric piano, string ensemble, tambourine, congas, hand claps, drums, percussion, background vocals
1976	Leo Sayer	Endless Flight	Warner Bros	Songwriter
1976	Carly Simon	Another Passenger	Elektra	Electric guitar
1976	JD Souther	Black Rose	Elektra	Guitars, piano, keyboards, tambourine, vocals, background vocals
1976	James Taylor	Greatest Hits	Warner Bros	Harmonium, background vocals
1976	Wendy Waldman	The Main Refrain	Warner Bros	Various instruments, background vocals
1977	Karla Bonoff	Karla Bonoff	Columbia	Electric and acoustic guitars, piano, electric piano, harmonium, clavinet, keyboards background vocals
1977	Fools Gold	Mr Lucky	EMI UK	Percussion
1977	Linda Ronstadt	Simple Dreams	Asylum	Drums, background vocals
1977	Linda Ronstadt	A Retrospective	Capitol	Electric and acoustic guitars, ukulele, piano, electric piano, tambourine, drums, percussion, background vocals
1978	Linda Ronstadt	Living in the USA	Asylum	Background vocals
1979	Karla Bonoff	Restless Nights	Columbia	Guitar, keyboards
1979	David James Holster	Chinese Hollymoon	Columbia	Piano
1979	Leah Kunkel	Leah Kunkel	Columbia	Acoustic Guitar
1979	Jennifer Warnes	Shot Through the Heart	Arista	Guitar, bass, keyboards, drums
1980	Jackson Browne	Hold Out	Asylum	Arrangements
1980	Andy Gross & The Natio	Longshoremen's Song	Hose	Electric and acoustic guitars
1980	Kate & Anna McGarrigle	French Record	Kebec-Disc	Electric and acoustic guitars
1980	Linda Ronstadt	Mad Love	Asylum	Background vocals
1980	Linda Ronstadt	Greatest Hits Vol 2	Elektra	Piano, clavinet
1981	Rita Coolidge	Heartbreak Radio	A&M	Produced By Andrew GoldAndrew Gold: Electric and acoustic guitars, keyboards, shaker, field drum, rolling snare drum, percussion, background vocals
1981	Bob Dylan	Shot of Love	Columbia	Every Grain of Sand Guitar
1981	Art Garfunkel	Scissors Cut	Columbia	Guitar
1981	Juice Newton	Juice	Capitol	Background vocals
1981	Bernadette Peters	Now Playing	MCA	Guitar
1981	Burt Bacharach	Arthur: The Album	Warner Bros	Some tracks produced by Andrew Gold. Guitar, percussion, background vocals, electric piano, guitar solo
1982	10cc	Ten Out of Ten	Warner Bros	Some tracks produced, co-written and mixed by Andrew Gold, background vocal, piano, vocoder, percussion, bass, guitar, electric piano, synthesizer
1982	Karla Bonoff	Wild Heart of the Young	Columbia	Guitars, electric piano, organ, percussion, background vocals
1982	Don Henley	I Can't Stand Still	Asylum	Keyboards
1982	Nicolette Larson	All Dressed Up & No Place to Go	Warner Bros	Produced By Andrew Gold Electric and acoustic guitars, mandolin, piano, synthesizer, keyboards, slide, percussion, harmony vocals, background vocals and songwriter
1982	Moon Martin	Mystery Ticket	Capitol	Some tracks produced by Andrew Gold, Guitar
1982	Juice Newton	Quiet Lies	Capitol	Guitar, background vocals
1982	Linda Ronstadt	Get Closer	Asylum	Electric guitar, piano, acoustic guitar,
1982	Glen Shorrock	Villain of the Piece	Capitol/EMI	Guitar, bass, keyboards, drums
1982	Jennifer Warnes	Best of	Arista	Guitar, bass, keyboards, drums
1983	Brock Walsh	Dateline Tokyo	Cool Sound	Co-Produced by Andrew Gold, Guitars, keyboards, bass, percussion, vocals
1983	Eikichi Yazawa	I Am a Model	Toshiba	Guitar, background vocals
1983	Rosemary Butler	Rose	Capitol	Guitar
1984	Juice Newton	Can't Wait All Night	RCA	Vocals, guitar, background vocals
1984	Soundtrack	Starman	Varese Saraban	All I Have to Do is Dream - arrangements
1984	Eikichi Yazawa	E	Warner/Pioneer	Guitars, keyboards, drum machine programming, snare, hi-hat, cymbals, horn arrangements, background vocals
1986	Karen Blake	Just One Heart	Café Records	Background vocals
1986	Frances Ruffelle	He's My Hero/Love's Not For Me	RCA UK	Co-produced and co-written
1986	Eikichi Yazawa	Tokyo Nights	Toshiba	Produced by Andrew Gold
1987	Rita Coolidge	Classics - Vol 5	A&M	The Closer You Get produced by Andrew Gold
1987	Vince Gill	The Way Back Home	RCA	Background vocals
1987	Eikichi Yazawa	Flash in Japan	Warner Bros	Co-produced by Andrew Gold, Keyboards, synthesizers, synthesizer programming, drum machine programming, snare, hi-hat, cymbals, horn arrangements background
1989	Peter Blakeley	Harry's Café de Wheels	Capitol	Co-produced by Andrew Gold, instrumentation
1989	Cher	Heart of Stone	Geffen	Heart of Stone Andrew Gold: Acoustic guitar, 12-string guitar, background vocals "Love on a Rooftop" Andrew Gold: Acoustic guitar
1989	Linda Ronstadt	Cry Like a Rainstorm/Howl Like the Wind	Elektra	Co-produced by Andrew Gold, electric and 12-string guitars
1990	Sarah Brightman	As I Came of Age	Decca	Acoustic guitar, electric guitar, electric 12-string guitar
1990	Bette Midler	Some People's Lives	Atlantic	Guitar
1990	The Simpsons	The Simpsons Sing the Blues	Geffen	Vocals, guitar
1990	Soundtrack	Cry-Baby	MCA	Vocals, various instruments
1990	John Warren	I Get This Feeling	Pony Canyon	Produced by Andrew Gold
1990	James Taylor	Classic Songs	WEA	Harmonium, background vocals
1990	Eikichi Yazawa	Eikichi	Toshiba	Produced by Andrew Gold
1991	Stephen Bishop	Jingle Bell Rock	Steve Vaus Prod	Produced by Andrew Gold
1991	Peter Blakeley	Be Thankful for What You've Got (Soundtrack)	Nelson Ent.	Produced by Andrew Gold
1991	Neil Diamond	Lovescape	Columbia	Guitar
1991	Nicolette Larson	This Christmas Day (Stars Come Out for Christmas)	Steve Vaus Prod	Produced by Andrew Gold
1991	John Andrew Parks	John Andrew Parks	Capitol	Guitar
1991	Diana Ross	The Force Behind the Power	Motown	Acoustic guitar, organ
1991	Eikichi Yazawa	I Don't Wanna Stop	Toshiba	Produced by Andrew Gold
1992	10cc	...Meanwhile	Polydor	12-string guitar
1992	Alvin and the Chipmunks	Chipmunks in Low Places	Epic/Chipmunk	Songwriter, guitars, keyboards
1992	Stephen Bishop	Let It Snow (The Stars Come Out to Christmas 93)	Steve Vaus Prod	Produced by Andrew Gold
1992	Neil Diamond	The Christmas Album	Columbia	Acoustic Guitar
1992	Celine Dion	Celion Dion	Epic	Show Some Emotion co-written by Andrew Gold
1992	Wynonna Judd	Wyonna	Curb/MCA	I Saw the Light co-written by Andrew Gold, background vocals
1992	Mitsou	Heading West	Isba/Unidisc	Electric and acoustic guitars
1992	Roy Orbison	King of Hearts	Virgin	Background vocals
1992	Ringo Starr	Time Takes Time	Private Music	Electric and acoustic guitar, background vocals
1993	Peter Blakeley	God's Little Elvis/Through the Looking Glass	Giant	Produced by Andrew Gold
1993	Beth Nielson Chapman	You Hold the Key	Reprise	Guitar
1993	Vince Gill	When Will I Be Loved (Soundtrack 8 Seconds)	MCA	Co-produced by Andrew Gold
1993	Kathy Mattea	Walking Away a Winner	Mercuy	Background vocals and "Streets of Your Town" and "Who Turned Out the Light" co-written by Andrew Gold
1993	Stephen Bishop	Heart and Souls (Soundtrack)	MCA	Various instruments
1993	Rick Vincent	A Wanted Man	Curb	Background vocals
1993	Kelly Willis	Kelly Willis	MCA	Background vocals
1993	Eikichi Yazawa	Heart	Toshiba	Co-produced by Andrew Gold, Guitars, keyboards, programming, percussion, background vocals
1993	Trisha Yearwood	The Song Remembers When	MCA Nashville	Better Your Heart Than Mine co-written by Andrew Gold, harmonies
1994	Michael Ball	One Careful Owner	Columbia UK	Wherever You Are, Leave a Light On produced by Andrew Gold and co-written by Andrew Gold
1994	Stephen Bishop	Blue Guitars	Pony Canyon	Produced, Engineered, Mixed, Electric/acoustic guitars, mandolin, piano, synthesizers, drums, percussion, harmony vocals, bkrd vocals
1994	Peter Blakeley	The Pale Horse	Giant	Co-produced by Andrew Gold, instrumentation
1994	Jaki Graham	Real Life	Critique/Avex	Facts of Love co-written by Andrew Gold
1994	Nicolette Larson	Sleep, Baby Sleep	Sony Wonder	Co-produced and arranged by Andrew Gold, harmonies, background vocals, all instruments
1994	Mac Mcanally	Knots	MCA	Background vocals
1994	Eikichi Yazawa	The Name is Yazawa	Toshiba	Produced by Andrew Gold
1995	10cc	Mirror Mirror	ZYX/Critique/Av	Vocals, background vocals, "Ready to Go Home" co-written by Andrew Gold
1995	Alvin and the Chipmunks	A Very Merry Chipmunk	Sony Wonder	Vocals, guitar, keyboards, programming, keyboard programming; Track:"Petit Papa Noel" Co-produced/co-engineered by Andrew Gold
1995	Karla Bonoff	New World	Music Masters	Nothing Love Can't Do co-produced by Andrew Gold, vocals, keyboards, guitars, programming
1995	Lisa Brokop	Lisa Brokop	Capitol Nashville	Background vocals
1995	Jennifer Love Hewitt	Let's Go Bang	Atlantic	In Another Life co-written by Andrew Gold
1995	Moon Martin	Street Fever, Mystery Ticket	Edsel UK	Produced by Andrew Gold, guitars
1995	Wendy Waldman	Love is the Only Goal: The Best of Wendy Waldm	Warner Bros	Vocals, electric guitar, piano, electric piano, background vocals
1995	Brian Wilson	I Just Wasn't Made for These Times	MCA	Background vocals
1996	Neil Diamond	In My Lifetime	Columbia	Guitar
1996	Annie Haslam	Blessing in Disguise	One Way Recor	In Another Life co-written by Andrew Gold
1996	Wynonna Judd	Revelations	Curb/MCA	Background vocals
1996	Glenn Shorrock	The First 20 Years	EMI Australia	Guitar
1997	Eric Carmen	Definitive Collection	BMG	Guitar
1997	Wynonna Judd	Collection	Curb/MCA	I Saw the Light co-written by Andrew Gold, background vocals
1997	Lila Mccann	Lila	Asylum	Yippy Ky Yay co-written by Andrew Gold
1997	Greg Prestopino	Big Red Nude	Ufemizm	Produced by Andrew Gold, Various instruments, background vocals, most tracks co-written by Gold
1997	Sugar Beats	Back to the Beat	Sugar Beats	Co-produced and co-engineered by Andrew Gold, Vocals, various instruments
1998	America	Human Nature	Oxygen	Vocals, various instruments
1998	The Simpsons	The Yellow Album	Geffen	Guitar
1998	Sugar Beats	How Sweet It Is	Sugar Beats	Co-produced and Co-engineered by Andrew Gold, Vocals, various instruments, arrangements
1999	Lisa Angelle	Kiss This, I Wear Your Love	DreamWorks	Co-produced, co-written by Andrew Gold, background vocals, various instruments
1999	Stephen Bishop	K-Tels Back to Back	K-Tel	Produced by Andrew Gold, various instruments
1999	Karla Bonoff	All My Life: The Best of Karla Bonoff	Sony	Background vocals, various instruments
1999	Beth Nielson Chapman	Greatest Hits	Reprise	Electric guitar
1999	Nicolette Larson	The Very Best of Nicolette Larson	Warner Bros	Produced by Andrew Gold, Guitar, slide guitar, piano, electric piano, synthesizer, percussion, background vocals
1999	Linda Ronstadt	Linda Ronstadt aka Box Set	Elektra	Acoustic/electric guitars, drums, piano, ARP string ens., congas, vocals, ukulele, tambourine, co-wrote "Try Me Again", arrangement
1999	Sugar Beats	Wild Thing	Sugar Beats	Co-produced and co-engineered by Andrew Gold, Vocals, various instruments
2000	Lisa Angelle	Lisa Angelle	DreamWorks	Co-produced by Andrew Gold, Electric/acoustic guitar, keyboards, bkrd vocals, most tracks co-written by Gold
2000	Serena Flagg	Come Hell or High Water	Infinite Musica	Produced by Andrew Gold, All instruments and background vocals
2000	Graham Gouldman	And Another Thing	For Your Love/D	Guitar/slide guitar, piano, organ, keyboards, harmonica, drum program, drums, vocals, "Sometimes", "Ready to Go Home" co-written
2000	Sugar Beats	Car Tunes	Sugar Beats	Co-produced and Co-engineered by Andrew Gold, Vocals, various instruments
2001	Trisha Yearwood	Inside Out	MCA Nashville	Background vocals
2001	Lisa Carrie	In Another Life	Self released	Produced by Andrew Gold, all instruments, 2 tracks co-written by Andrew Gold
2001	Hal Ketchum	Lucky Man	Curb/MCA	Vocals
2001	Aaron Neville	Ultimate Collection	Hip-o	Guitar
2001	Sugar Beats	A Sugarbeats Christmas	Sugar Beats	Co-produced and co-engineered by Andrew Gold, Vocals, various instruments
2001	The Wilkinsons	Shine	Giant	Background vocals, Hypothetically co-written by Andrew Gold
2002	America	Holiday Harmony	Rhino	Produced, Engineered and Arranged by Gold, Various instruments, background vocals, Christmas in California" co-written by Gold
2002	Shannon Lawson	Chase the Sun	MCA Nashville	Electric guitar, background vocals
2002	Linda Ronstadt	The Very Best of Linda Ronstadt	Rhino	Various instruments and vocals
2002	Carly Simon	Anthology	Rhino	Guitar
2003	Cher	The Very Best of Cher	Warner Bros	Heart of StoneAndrew Gold: Acoustic guitar, 12-string guitar, background vocals
2003	Deana Carter	I'm Just a Girl	Arista	Background vocals
2004	Stephen Bishop	A Dance of the Heart, His Best & More	Poly East	Co-produced, co-engineered, electric guitar
2004	Rita Coolidge	Delta Lady: The Rita Coolidge Anthology	Hip-o	Co-produced by Andrew Gold, various instruments, vocals
2004	Jesse McCartney	Beautiful Soul	Hollywood	Tracks: Co-produced by Andrew Gold "Why Don't You Kiss Her?" "Ready for You"; Composed by Andrew Gold and Greg Prestopino
2004	Danny O'Keefe	Classics - Vol 5	Rhino	Piano
2004	Sugar Beats	Greatest Dance Hits	Sugar Beats	Co-produced and Co-engineered by Andrew Gold: Vocals, various instruments
2004	Jennifer Warnes	Love Lifts Us Up: A Collection 1969-1983	Raven Records	Guitar, bass, keyboards, drums
2005	Various	Greatest Dance Hits: Take 2	Walt Disney Rec	Tracks: JESSE MCCARTNEY - "Good Life" Co-produced by Andrew Gold
2006	America & Friends	Live at the Ventura Theater	Brilliant	Vocals, guitar, keyboards
2006	Leah Kunkel	Leah Kunkel/I Run With Trouble	Rev-Ola	Acoustic Guitar
2006	Lauren Wood	Love, Death & Customer Service	Bad Art	Electric Guitar
2006	Neil Young	Living with War	Reprise	Choir vocals
2007	Ana Guigui	Love is on The Line	QBrain	Produced by Andrew Gold, songs co-written, Guitars, piano, organ, synthesizer programming, percussion, background vocals
2007	Juice Newton	Old Flame/Dirty Looks	Raven Records	Acoustic guitar, background vocals
2007	JD Souther	Border Town: The Best of JD Souther	Salvo UK	Electric guitar, piano, electric piano, background vocals
2008	Karla Bonoff	The Columbia Connection	Arcadia	Electric and acoustic guitar, piano, percussion, background vocals
2008	Trini Lopez	Ramblin' Man	Fuel	Guitar, programming, background vocals
2008	Leo Sayer	Another Year, Endless Flight	Edsel	Guitar, Endless Flight track written by Andrew Gold
2009	Trini Lopez	El Immortal	Fuel	Tracks: "Let Your Love Flow" "Wonderful World" Arranged and Engineered, Various instruments, background vocals
2009	Sally Kellerman	Sally	Music Force Me	Guitar, percussion, background vocals
2007	America	Ventura Highway	The Store for M	Vocals, guitars, keyboards; Cuts and Covers

==== Cuts and covers ====
Year	Artist	Album or single	Notes
1976	James Gang	Jesse Come Home	I Can't Wait - Composed by Andrew Gold and Mark Goldenberg "That's Why I Love You" - Composed by Andrew Gold and Gene Garfin
1976	Judy Collins	Bread & Roses	Love Hurts composed by Andrew Gold
1976	Barbi Benton	Something New	Something New composed by Andrew Gold
1976	Linda Ronstadt	Hasten Down the Wind	Try Me Again - Composed by Andrew Gold and Linda Ronstadt Reached #3 on Billboard's Pop Album chart
1976	Leo Sayer	Endless Flight	Endless Flight - Composed by Andrew Gold Reached #10 on Billboard's Pop Album Chart
1977	Seppo Narhi	Enkelit on Havinaista Rilstaa	Heartaches in Heartaches [Ammuit Mua Siipeen] - Composed by Andrew Gold (Finnish Lyrics by Hector)
1977	Cliff Richard	That's Why I Love You (single)	That's Why I Love You - Composed by Andrew Gold and Gene Garfin
1979	Anne Murray	New Kind of Feeling	That's Why I Love You - Composed by Andrew Gold and Gene Garfin Reached #2 on Billboard Country
1979	Nighttrain	Heartaches in Heartaches (single)	Heartaches in Heartaches - Composed by Andrew Gold
1980	Cretones	Thin Red Line	I Can't Wait - Composed by Andrew Gold and Mark Goldenberg
1981	Yumi Hirasawa	Love Affairs	I Can't Wait - Composed by Andrew Gold and Mark Goldenberg "That's Why I Love You" - Composed by Andrew Gold and Gene Garfin
1982	10cc	Ten Out of Ten	The Power of Love "We've Heard It All Before" and "Run Away" - Composed by Eric Stewart, Graham Gouldman and Andrew Gold
1982	Nicolette Larson	All Dressed Up & No Place to Go	The Power of Love - Composed by Stewart/Gouldman/Gold"I Want You So Bad" - Composed by Larson/Gold "Still You Linger On" - Composed by Andrew Gold
1983	Nitty Gritty Dirt Band	Let's Go	Heartaches in Heartaches - Composed by Andrew Gold
1984	Trevor Walters	Never Let Her Slip Away (single)	Never Let Her Slip Away - Composed by Andrew Gold
1991	Rudolph Rock & Die Sch	Herzlichst	Lonely Boy [Ich Bin Ja So Allein] - Composed by Andrew Gold (German Lyrics by Okko Bekker)
1992	Celine Dion	Celine Dion	Show Some Emotion - Composed by Andrew Gold, Gregory Prestopino and Brock Walsh
1992	The Golden Girls	Best of Loading Bay Vol 1	Thank You for Being a Friend - Composed by Andrew Gold
1992	Alvin & the Chipmunks	Chipmunks in Low Places	The Power of Love - by Stewart/Gouldman/Gold, "Gotta Believe in Pumpkins" - by Gold/Bagdasarian, "I Ain't No Dang Cartoon" - by Gold/Bagdasarian/Karman
1992	Undercover	Never Let Her Slip Away (single)	Never Let Her Slip Away - Composed by Andrew Gold Reached #5 on Billboard UK
1992	Wynonna	1992	Never Let Her Slip Away - Composed by Andrew Gold Reached #1 on Billboard Country
1993	Trisha Yearwood	The Song Remembers When	Better Your Heart Than Mine - Composed by Andrew Gold and Lisa Angelle Reached #6 on Billboard's country albums.
1993	Kathy Mattea	Walking Away a Winner	The Streets of Your Town - Composed by Andrew Gold and Jenny L. Yates"Who Turned Out the Light" - Composed by Andrew Gold and Lisa Angelle
1994	Stephen Bishop	Blue Guitars	I Go Numb - Composed by Stephen Bishop, Tom Snow, and Andrew Gold
1994	Michael Ball	One Careful Owner	Wherever You Are - Composed by Andrew Gold and Graham Gouldman
1995	Hana Hana	Lonely Girl	Lonely Girl [Lonely Boy] - Composed by Andrew Gold
1995	Aaron Neville	The Tattooed Heart	Heartaches in Heartaches [Ammuit Mua Siipeen] - Composed by Andrew Gold (Finnish Lyrics by Hector)
1995	Jennifer Love Hewitt	Let's Go Bang	In Another Life - Composed by Andrew Gold, Sam Lorber and Greg Prestopino
1995	Jaki Graham	Real Life	Facts of Love - Composed by Andrew Gold and Graham Gouldman
1995	Morten Harket	Wild Seed	Ready to Go Home - Composed by Andrew Gold and Graham Gouldman
1995	10cc	Mirror Mirror	Run Away - Composed by Eric Stewart, Graham Gouldman and Andrew Gold
1995	Dave	Cote Coeur	Never Let Her Slip Away "Oh Urania (Take Me Away) - Composed by Andrew Gold (French lyrics by E. Palatovski)
1995	Mitch Malloy & Paul Car	Ceilings & Walls	Ready to Go Home - Composed by Andrew Gold and Graham Gouldman
1996	Annie Haslam	Blessing in Disguise	In Another Life - Composed by Andrew Gold, Sam Lorber and Greg Prestopino
1996	Cynthia Fee	Television's Greatest Hits	Thank You for Being a Friend - Composed by Andrew Gold
1997	Greg Prestopino	Big Red Nude	Several tracks co-written by Andrew Gold
1997	Farrah	Cut Out and Keep	Lonely Boy - Composed by Andrew Gold
1997	Lila McCann	Lila	Yippy Ky Yay - Composed by Andrew Gold and Mark Spiro Reached #8 on Billboard
1998	Valerie DeLaCruz	My Girlfriend's Quilt	Thank You for Being a Friend - Composed by Andrew Gold
1998	Nicolette Larson	Women of Christmas in the Garden of Lilith	This Christmas Day - Composed by Andrew Gold and James Caprio
1999	Rocko Schamoni	Showtime	Bridge to Your Heart [Gegen den Staat] - Composed by Andrew Gold and Graham Gouldman (German Lyrics by Rocko Schamoni)
1999	Smooch	Thank You for Being a Friend (single)	Thank You for Being a Friend - Composed by Andrew Gold
2000	Trisha Yearwood	Real Live Woman	Try Me Again - Composed by Andrew Gold and Linda Ronstadt Reached #4 on Billboard's Country Album charts
2000	Graham Gouldman	And Another Thing	Sometimes "Ready to Go Home" - Composed by Andrew Gold and Graham Gouldman
2000	The Wilkinsons	Here and Now	Hypothetically - Composed by Andrew Gold and Gary Burr
2000	Lisa Angelle	Twisted	4321 "Twisted" " I Wear Your Love" "Kiss This" "Midnight Rodeo" "I Didn't Want to Know" Composed by Andrew Gold and Lisa Angelle
2001	Lisa Carrie	In Another Life	I Go Numb - Composed by Stephen Bishop, Tom Snow, and Andrew Gold, "In Another Life composed by Andrew Gold, Greg Prestopino and Tom Snow
2001	Asia	Aura	Wherever You Are "Ready to Go Home" composed by Graham Gouldman and Andrew Gold
2002	America	Holiday Harmony	Christmas in California - Composed by Andrew Gold and Dewey Bunnell
2004	Jesse McCartney	Beautiful Soul	Ready for You - Composed by Andrew Gold and Greg Prestopino
2006	Petula Clark	Paris/Orleans/Paris The CBS Years Vol 1	Lonely Boy - Composed by Andrew Gold
2006	Animatd Coochie Wonde	Thank You for Being a Friend (single)	Thank You for Being a Friend - Composed by Andrew Gold
2007	The Countdown	TV Greatest Hits Vol 4	Thank You for Being a Friend - Composed by Andrew Gold
2007	John Payne	Different Worlds	Ready to Go Home - Composed by Andrew Gold and Graham Gouldman
2007	Lazlo Bane	Guilty Pleasures	Lonely Boy - Composed by Andrew Gold
2007	Ana Guigui	Love is On the Line	Multiple tracks co-written by Andrew Gold
2008	Graham Blvd	Hit Parade 1978	Thank You for Being a Friend - Composed by Andrew Gold
2008	Bobby Morganstein	The Complete Grand Entrance Party	Thank You for Being a Friend - Composed by Andrew Gold
2008	Brynn Marie	Start Now	Thank You for Being a Friend - Composed by Andrew Gold
2009	KnightsBridge	TV Themes of the 80s	Thank You for Being a Friend - Composed by Andrew Gold
2009	The Starlite Singers	Three Little Birds	Thank You for Being a Friend - Composed by Andrew Gold
2009	Billy Crawford	Groove	Never Let Her Slip Away - Composed by Andrew Gold
2010	Elaine Page & Dionne W	Elaine Page & Friends	Thank You for Being a Friend - Composed by Andrew Gold
2010	The Royal Instrumental	TV Hits Vol 6	Thank You for Being a Friend - Composed by Andrew Gold
2010	The Blue Rubatos	Songs for Mother's Day	Thank You for Being a Friend - Composed by Andrew Gold
2010	Golden Girl	POPular Vol 1 (remix)	Thank You for Being a Friend - Composed by Andrew Gold
2010	Tight Fit	Never Let Her Slip Away (single)	Never Let Her Slip Away - Composed by Andrew Gold
2010	Starlite Orchestra	Hits TV	Thank You for Being a Friend - Composed by Andrew Gold
2011	Graham Blvd	Rock on 1978 Vol 2	Thank You for Being a Friend - Composed by Andrew Gold
2011	Father's Day Group	Ti voglio bene Mamma	Thank You for Being a Friend - Composed by Andrew Gold
2011	Twilight Trio	Pure Instrumental: Timeless Classics	Thank You for Being a Friend - Composed by Andrew Gold
2011	Hit Collective	Classic TV Themes	Thank You for Being a Friend - Composed by Andrew Gold
2012	Voice of McDonald's Europe	Thank You for Being a Friend (single)	Thank You for Being a Friend - Composed by Andrew Gold
2012	Alyssa Bonagura	Thank You for Being a Friend (single)	Thank You for Being a Friend - Composed by Andrew Gold
2012	Instrumental All Stars	Instrumental Gold: Timeless Legends	Thank You for Being a Friend - Composed by Andrew Gold
2012	Mike Viola	Super Hits of the Seventies (WFMU)	Lonely Boy - Composed by Andrew Gold
2012	The T.V. Band	T.V. Music Series	Thank You for Being a Friend - Composed by Andrew Gold
2013	Cool & Classy	Take on Crooners	Thank You for Being a Friend - Composed by Andrew Gold
2013	Micah's Rule	Walk This Road	Thank You for Being a Friend - Composed by Andrew Gold
2013	Angela Galuppo	Angelo Galuppo	Thank You for Being a Friend - Composed by Andrew Gold
2013	The London Studio Orch	Terrific TV Themes	Thank You for Being a Friend - Composed by Andrew Gold
2013	Brandon Schott	Drink A Toast To Innocence: A Tribute To Lite Rock	Thank You for Being a Friend - Composed by Andrew Gold
2014	Power Music Workout	35 Feel Good Workout Mixes	Thank You for Being a Friend - Composed by Andrew Gold
2014	Wild Stylerz	Thanksgiving Music Mix - Pop Songs with Gratitude	Thank You for Being a Friend - Composed by Andrew Gold
2014	Cottage Sounds	Thank You for Being a Friend (single)	Thank You for Being a Friend - Composed by Andrew Gold
2014	Left Boy	Permanent Midnight	Lonely Boy - Composed by Andrew Gold sampled in "10am"
2014	Bliss	Superstern	Thank You for Being a Friend - Composed by Andrew Gold
2014	Stephen Bishop	Thank You for Being a Friend (single)	Thank You for Being a Friend - Composed by Andrew Gold
2015	Orlando Pops Orchestra	The 70s Great T.V. Theme Songs	Thank You for Being a Friend - Composed by Andrew Gold
2016	The Starlite Singers	The Essential Television Soundtrack Library	Thank You for Being a Friend - Composed by Andrew Gold
2020	DMA ILLAN	Single	Spooky, Scary Skeletons - Composed by Andrew Gold
2020	LVCRFT	Single	Spooky, Scary Skeletons - Composed by Andrew Gold
2021	Tardigrade Inferno	Single	Spooky, Scary Skeletons - Composed by Andrew Gold
2023	The Living Tombstone	Single	Witches Witches Witches - Composed by Andrew Gold
2024	Wubbaduck Remix	Single	Spooky, Scary Skeletons - Composed by Andrew Gold
