= She Needs Love =

1965 single by Wayne Fontana and the Mindbenders

Single by Wayne Fontana and the Mindbenders
- B-side: "Like I Did"
- Released: 10 September 1965
- Recorded: 1965
- Studio: Philips (London)
- Genre: Beat
- Length: 2:27
- Label: Fontana
- Songwriter: Clint Ballard Jr.
- Producer: Jack Baverstock

Wayne Fontana singles chronology
"It's Just a Little Bit Too Late" (1965)	"She Needs Love" (1965)	"It Was Easier To Hurt Her" (1965)

The Mindbenders singles chronology
"It's Just a Little Bit Too Late" (1965)	"She Needs Love" (1965)	"A Groovy Kind of Love" (1965)

Official audio
- She Needs Love on YouTube

"She Needs Love" is a song written by Clint Ballard Jr. for Wayne Fontana and the Mindbenders. It was the third and final song written by him that the group recorded, following "The Game of Love" and "It's Just a Little Bit Too Late". Upon release, the single only reached number 32 in the UK, which prompted Fontana to pursue a solo career while the Mindbenders continued as a trio.

== Background and release ==
Wayne Fontana and the Mindbenders had enjoyed a cross-atlantic hit with the song "The Game of Love", which topped the Billboard Hot 100 and reached number two in the UK's Record Retailer in mid-1965. The song was composed by Clint Ballard Jr., who with it proved that he could pursue a career in songwriting. Knowing that the Mindbenders had made it big, he offered them another of his compositions, "It's Just a Little Bit Too Late" which was released in the summer of 1965 and became a minor hit on both Billboard Hot 100 and Record Retailer. Unlike "The Game Of Love", "It's Just A Bit Too Late" failed to reach the top-ten, peaking at number twenty on the latter chart. This led to suspicion of the group becoming a one-hit wonder or eventually breaking up. In a last resort, they gave another Ballard Jr. composition a chance, this being "She Needs Love" being produced by Fontana Records house producer Jack Baverstock. The single was eventually released on 10 September 1965 through Fontana.

The single entered the Record Retailer chart on 6 October 1965 at a position of number 44, before reaching its peak the following week at number 32. It exited the chart on 11 November of that year at a position of 45. The single only spent six weeks in the charts. Although the record was released in both the Netherlands and the United States, it failed to chart in both territories. According to Dave Thompson of AllMusic, the group's "magic had already dissipated" with the low charting of the single. Wayne Fontana had long had dreams of going solo and with the release of "She Needs Love", both he and his management felt that it was reasonable. Without informing the band, he continued to perform with them until he suddenly walked off-stage during a show in October of that year, saying to their guitarist Eric Stewart "it's all yours. The Mindbenders would eventually continue after the departure of Fontana, with Steward taking the role as a lead vocalist.

"She Needs Love" was never included on any albums by the group, but the album Eric, Rick, Wayne and Bob – It's Wayne Fontana and the Mindbenders was issued during the same time, and the B-side "Like I Did" is included on it. The song was released in January 1966's Walking On Air EP, which was the last release by the band billed as Wayne Fontana and the Mindbenders in their original incarnation. Its first album release came through the Fontana Records compilation Beat Scene Now in 1967.

== Reception ==
Upon release in the United Kingdom, the single received positive reviews. Reviewing for New Musical Express, Derek Johnson states that the single "has a simply constructed melody that registers quickly", stating that he found himself whistling to it after a few repeats. He states that Fontana "sings competently" and states that the Mindbenders are "bumming in the background". He emphasises the song's beat, stating that the shake rhythm is complemented by "cymbal crashing and heavy handed drumming". He ends by believing that it will do better in the charts than "It's Just a Little Bit Too Late." Record Mirror's Norman Jopling and Peter Jones states that "She Needs Love" has a "powerhouse instrumental opening", which "settles into a swing-beat ballad." He praises Fontana's falsetto in the "big-ranged melody". He states that the backing is rudimentary and simple, but effective enough, claiming it gets melodically tricky towards the middle. In Disc Weekly, Penny Valentine praises songwriter Clint Ballard Jr. for providing the Mindbenders with yet another hit single. She compliments the heavy beat of the song, comparing the drumming to "The Game Of Love", which she believes fits perfectly together with the guitar riff. She states that Fontana sings the song in a very delicate manner but doesn't know whether it will become a hit or not.

Though it didn't chart in the United States, it still got positively reviewed in the press. In Billboard magazine it's described as a "much awaited and hot rhythm follow-up to their past hit" and states that the single will certainly reach the charts without problem. Cash Box magazine calls it a "potent follow-up stanza" to "It's Just a Little Bit Too Late". They write that the single has strong potential of charting with an "easy-going, rhythmic blues-tinged" influence and note the love-related lyrics of the song. In Record World, the connection to "The Game of Love" is referenced both through the title and the songwriter and is referred to as a "sweet rockaballad". However, not everybody was positive about the single. Colin Larkin writes that it is a "sub-par" follow-up to their two previous hit singles which deserved not to chart.

== Charts ==
Chart (1965)	Peak position
UK Singles (Official Charts Company)	32

== Other versions ==
- British duo Peter and Gordon recorded it for their 1967 album Hot, Cold & Custard.
