= Friday Brown =

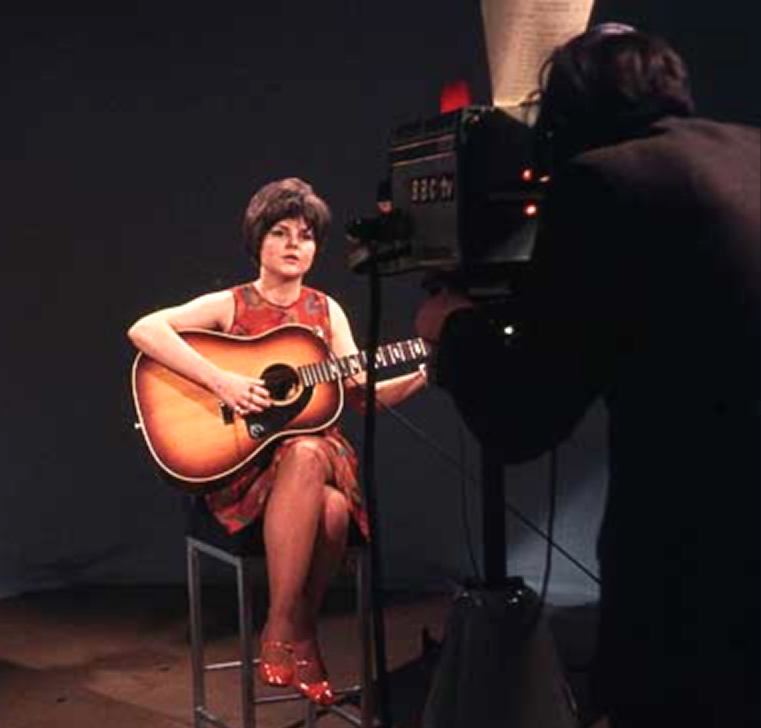
- Friday Brown performing at the Manchester BBC TV studios in the early seventies for the 'Look North' show. © Mike Baker.

Background information
- Born: Marian Stockley; 18 February 1947 (age 79); Walkden, Lancashire, England
- Genres: Pop
- Occupation: Singer-songwriter
- Instruments: Vocals, guitar, piano
- Years active: 1964-1984
- Labels: Fontana, Phillips
- Website: The Friday Brown Archive

Friday Brown (born Marian Stockley; 18 February 1947) is an English singer-songwriter from Walkden, Lancashire, England. She was active from the mid-1960s through to the mid-1980s, recording seven solo singles and one LP in the UK. Her most well-known record was the single "32nd Love Affair", which was co-written with her sister, Barbara Stockley. She performed regularly on UK radio and television, and at venues across Britain and Europe.

== Early life ==
Brown was the daughter of the headmaster of a school in Little Hulton, Salford. She attended Bolton College of Art, but left before graduating to pursue a career in music.

== Career ==
At age 15, Brown began singing with the Mike Taylor Combo after meeting one of its members, Wilf Lewis, a fellow student at Bolton College of Art. The band played at venues in Darwen and elsewhere in Lancashire until they disbanded in 1965.

Brown and Mike Taylor formed a group "Marianne and Mike", in which Brown performed under the name Marianne. The group released a single, "As he Once was Mine", written by Wilf Lewis, in 1964. Later the same year the group released a second single, "You're the Only One".

In 1966 the singer-songwriter Graham Gouldman, along with Harvey Lisberg, the creator of Herman's Hermits, formed a group called High Society, which included Friday Brown, Peter Cowap, Christine Ebbrell and Keith Lawless. They issued "People Passing By", written by Goldman, accompanied by Phil Dennys, Clem Cattini of The Tornados and John Paul Jones, later of Led Zeppelin. Gouldman went on to create Strawberry Studios in Stockport, where Friday Brown made some of her later recordings.

In 1966 Brown also released the single "Getting Nowhere", this time under the name Friday Brown. The song was written by Graham Gouldman; the B-side was "And (To Me He Meant Everything)" written by Brown and her sister Barbara Stockley. The same year Brown went on a UK nationwide tour with a number of artists, including Herman's Hermits, The Mindbenders, Dave Berry.

Friday's next single, "32nd Love Affair", released in 1966, was also co-written by Brown and Stockley. The following year Brown recorded a single of "Ask any Woman" and in 1969 released a cover version of "Stand by Your Man".

=== Television and radio ===
Early in her career, Friday appeared regularly on BBC radio, beginning with "Folk Room" and "Saturday Club (BBC radio)" in the mid-'60s, followed by "Late Night Extra" and "Follow the Stars", both with the BBC Northern Dance Orchestra, as well as "Night Ride" in the seventies.

In 1966 she appeared several times on the Granada TV series "Scene". In 1970 she hosted her own television show, "A Girl Called Friday", directed by George Adams and shown on ITV Tyne Tees, She appeared in "The Golden Shot" on Associated Television (ATV), which starred Bob Monkhouse, and on "The Stanley Baxter Show" and was a guest on a number of other television and radio shows in Great Britain. The same year, Friday recorded two shows for the BBC-2 series "One More Time" and in September sang on the "Show of the North" from BBC Glasgow.

Brown continued to perform on both national and local shows, and headlined as show called "Reflections", with the guest group Fivepenny Piece, in which she performed her composition "If I were a Sailing Ship", accompanied by the augmented BBC Northern Dance Orchestra. In 1972 she hosted a six-week show, "Tuesday Night is Friday Night" on BBC-1 (North West).

Other TV appearances included BBC TV's "The Two Ronnies", the BBC's North West show "Wait While" and she was featured in a 1975 BBC production, "Castle Concert".

=== Performances in Europe ===
Friday won the 10th European Song Cup contest at Knokke-le-Zoute, Belgium in 1968; the show was broadcast on Eurovision.

In 1969 Brown performed at the Golden Rose Festival at Montreux. The same year she was included on a record entitled "Philips Artists at the Golden Rose of Montreux", singing "Stand by Your Man" and "I Want the Rain"; she also performed that year on "The Golden Shot" TV show.

In 1970 Brown won the "Polish Day" contest, representing the UK as one of 30 competing nations at the 10th Sopot International Song Festival, Poland. She had written the words to the song "Be With Me" as an interpretation of a Polish song; the music had been arranged by Brian Fitzgerald, deputy conductor of the BBC Northern Dance Orchestra. She was awarded 15,000 Zloty (£300).

In 1971 she played at the Split Song Festival in Yugoslavia, where she 'sang the last verse of her partner's song, 'Plovi Brode Moj' in Yugoslav, which she had to learn phonetically.

Brown's last performance in Europe was at Rostock in 1978, at that time in East Germany, where she sang at the Rostock International Song Festival.

=== Later career ===
Brown released her LP, Friday Brown on the Philips label in 1971; it was produced by Peter Knight (composer). It was well-received, with the NME saying that she 'makes them [the songs] fresh, giving each song a new meaning'. Friday's composition for this album, "Once I was a Sailing Ship", appeared on singer Val Doonican's 1970 album The Many Moods of Val Doonican, and his 1972 album, Morning has Broken.

Brown continued to perform at live venues, including the London Savoy hotel during 1972 and 1973, and The Val Doonican Show at the Empire Theatre, Liverpool, in October 1972. In September 1973, she released a cover version of "A Groovy Kind of Love".

Her song "The Outdoor Seminar", co-written with her sister Barbara and originally released in 1967, was included on the 2013 album Piccadilly Sunshine, Vol. 12: British Pop Psych and Other Flavours 1967-1971. In 1978, she contributed as a vocalist to the album The Eye of Wendor by Mandalaband with Graham Gouldman.
