= Live in Concert (Sad Café album) =

Live album by Sad Café
- Released: March 1981
- Recorded: 15–17 April 1980
- Venue: Manchester Apollo, Manchester
- Genre: Pop rock
- Length: 79:54
- Label: RCA
- Producer: Neil Levine; Sad Café

Sad Café chronology
Sad Café (1980)	Live in Concert (1981)	Olé (1981)

Professional ratings
Review scores
Source	Rating
AllMusic	2/5 stars
Encyclopedia of Popular Music	2/5 stars

Live in Concert is a live double album by English rock band Sad Café, released in March 1981 by RCA Records. It was the band's only live album while together and was the last album by the band to be released under RCA. The album peaked at number 37 on the UK Albums Chart.

The album was recorded at the Manchester Apollo, across three days in April 1980 (15 to 17 April) as part of a 24 concert 'Tour of Britain' to promote the band's third album Facades which had been released in September 1979. The live album includes songs from the band's first three albums. The song "I Believe (Love Will Survive)" was also performed, but not included on the album. It was instead included on the Live in Concert EP, along with "Black Rose", "Emptiness" and "Hungry Eyes", released in February 1981. The album was reissued on CD by Cherry Red Records on 20 October 2014 and included "I Believe (Love Will Survive)" as a bonus track.

== Track listing ==
Side one
No.	Title	Writer(s)	Length
1.	"On with the Show"	Paul Young, Ian Wilson, Vic Emerson, Ashley Mulford, John Stimpson	6:47
2.	"Emptiness"	Young, Mulford, Wilson	3:53
3.	"Strange Little Girl"	Mulford	4:42
4.	"Hungry Eyes"	Young, Emerson	5:35

Side two
No.	Title	Writer(s)	Length
1.	"La-Di-Da"	Young, Stimpson	5:10
2.	"What Am I Gonna Do"	Wilson	4:32
3.	"Keeping It from the Troops"	Young, Wilson, Mulford, Stimpson, Dave Irving, Emerson, Lenni Zaksen	7:01
4.	"Every Day Hurts"	Young, Stimpson, Emerson	4:02

Side three
No.	Title	Writer(s)	Length
1.	"Take Me to the Future"	Wilson, Young, Stimpson	3:57
2.	"Feel Like Dying"	Young	4:04
3.	"Immortal"	Stimpson, Mulford	5:11
4.	"Restless"	Stimpson, Young, Wilson, Mulford	7:40

Side four
No.	Title	Writer(s)	Length
1.	"My Oh My"	Young, Emerson	5:00
2.	"Black Rose"	Young, Stimpson	4:40
3.	"Bell Ends"	Young	7:40
Total length:			79:54

2014 Cherry Red bonus track
No.	Title	Writer(s)	Length
16.	"I Believe (Love Will Survive)"	Young	4:15

== Personnel ==
Sad Café

- Paul Young – lead vocals
- Ashley Mulford – lead guitar, backing vocals
- Ian Wilson – rhythm guitar, backing vocals
- John Stimpson – bass guitar, backing vocals
- Vic Emerson – keyboards
- Dave Irving – drums
- Lenni Zaksen – saxophone

Technical

- Neil Levine – recording engineer, producer, remixing
- Nigel Walker – recording engineer
- Recorded at the Manchester Apollo using the Island Mobile; remixed at Revolution Studios, Manchester
