= Clint Ballard Jr. =

American songwriter, singer, and pianist

- Also known as: Buddy Clinton
- Born: Clinton Conger Ballard Jr. May 24, 1931; El Paso, Texas, U.S.
- Died: December 23, 2008 (aged 77) Denton, Texas, U.S.
- Occupation: Songwriter
- Years active: 1960s–1970s

Clinton Conger Ballard Jr. (May 24, 1931 – December 23, 2008) was an American songwriter, singer, and pianist. He wrote two Billboard Hot 100 number one hits. The first was "Game of Love" by Wayne Fontana and The Mindbenders in 1965. The second was the 1975 hit, "You're No Good" by Linda Ronstadt (first sung by Dee Dee Warwick, covered by The Swinging Blue Jeans, Betty Everett and later recorded by Van Halen). He wrote two UK number one singles, recorded by Jimmy Jones ("Good Timin'", 1960) and The Hollies ("I'm Alive", 1965).

Ballard also pursued a solo singing career. With minor success he recorded under his own name, as well as under the pseudonym Buddy Clinton.

== Biography ==
When Ballard was three years old, he played the piano for KTSM, an El Paso radio station. When he was 11, he attended a musical program for gifted students at the University of North Texas. After serving in the US Army, he moved to New York and became a songwriter and a composer of musicals, including Come Back Little Sheba. His song, "Hey, Little Baby", was recorded by band leader Mitch Miller and became the theme of the 1958 World's Fair in Belgium.

Earlier in his career in 1957, Ballard 'discovered' the Kalin Twins and became their manager. Ballard wrote the Kalins' Decca debut single, "Jumpin' Jack". The follow-up, "When" made the US Top Ten and number one on the UK Singles Chart. After leaving the Kalins, in 1958, he wrote "Ev'ry Hour, Ev'ry Day of My Life", a hit for Malcolm Vaughan, and Frankie Avalon's Top Ten hit "Ginger Bread".

Ballard's own recording career was less successful. In addition to recording several singles under his own name without much success, in 1960 he adopted the alias Buddy Clinton to cut a two-sided single featuring the songs "Take Me to Your Ladder (I'll See Your Leader Later)" and "Joanie's Forever", both co-written by then-unknown composer Burt Bacharach with his writing partner Bob Hilliard.

Ballard wrote one of his most successful songs in 1963, "You're No Good", which was first recorded by Dee Dee Warwick. A competing version recorded by Betty Everett appeared weeks later and was a bigger hit, reaching the Top Ten of the US Billboard R&B chart. A year later, the British group The Swinging Blue Jeans also recorded "You're No Good". Linda Ronstadt's version hit number one on the Billboard chart in 1975.

Ballard's songs were often recorded by artists of the British Invasion. The Swinging Blue Jeans recorded "It Isn't There". In 1966, the Zombies recorded his "Gotta Get a Hold of Myself". Ballard wrote "I'm Alive" for The Hollies, which was number one in the UK Singles Chart in 1965. One of Ballard's best-known songs, "The Game of Love", was recorded by Manchester-based Wayne Fontana and the Mindbenders in 1965. The single went hit number one in the US and peaked at number two in the UK. Ballard also wrote the subsequent Mindbenders' chart singles "It's Just a Little Bit Too Late" and "She Needs Love".

Ballard later wrote songs for the Ricky Nelson film, Love and Kisses. He also wrote a series of commercial jingles, including a theme for Greyhound Lines.

He died in Denton, Texas, in December 2008, two years after suffering a stroke.

He is not to be confused with fellow songwriters Russ Ballard, Glen Ballard or Hank Ballard.

== Songwriting credits ==
- "A Cold, Cold Winter" – Walter Jackson
- "A Miracle" – Gene McDaniels
- "A Very Good Year for Girls" – Johnny Tillotson, Brian Poole & The Tremeloes
- "Come Back Little Sheba" – Original cast of Little Sheba
- "Come Out Dancin'" – Ricky Nelson
- "Don't You Even Care (What's Gonna Happen to Me) – The Hollies
- "Fiddle Around" – Jan and Dean
- "Game of Love" – Wayne Fontana and The Mindbenders, Montrose
- "Ginger Bread" – Frankie Avalon
- "Good Timin'" – Jimmy Jones
- "Gotta Get a Hold of Myself" – Michael Haslam, Dee Dee Warwick, The Zombies
- "Hey Lulu" – Shane Fenton
- "I'm Alive" – The Hollies, Syndicate of Sound, Gamma
- "In The Rain" – Billy Eckstine
- "In A Long White Room" (lyrics by Marty Charnin) (Nancy Wilson on 1969 Capitol album Nancy)
- "It Isn't There" – The Swinging Blue Jeans, Johnny Burnette, George Maharis
- "It's Better Than Nothing At All" – Louis Prima
- "It's Just a Little Bit Too Late" – Wayne Fontana and The Mindbenders, The Druids
- "It Would Still Be Worth It" – Connie Francis
- "Je Revis" – Frank Alamo
- "Journey's End" – Frankie Laine
- "The Ladder of Love" - The Flamingos, Johnny Nash
- "Little Bitty Girl" – Bobby Rydell
- "My Precious Angel" – Jimmy Jones
- "Now That You've Got Me (You Don't Seem to Want Me)" – The Swinging Blue Jeans
- "Oh No!" – The Browns
- "One of Us (Will Weep Tonight)" – Patti Page
- "She Needs Love" – Wayne Fontana and The Mindbenders
- "Speak Her Name" – David and Jonathan, Walter Jackson
- "Stop Crying, Little Girl" – Arthur Prysock
- "Sufferer" – Patti Drew
- "There's Not a Minute" – Ricky Nelson
- "You Ain't Right" – The Frost
- "You're No Good" – Dee Dee Warwick, Betty Everett, The Swinging Blue Jeans, Linda Ronstadt, Wild Orchid, Weyes Blood, Van Halen, Michael Bolton
