= Sad Café (disambiguation) =

Sad Café may refer to:

- Sad Café, a band featuring Paul Young
  - Sad Café (album) by Sad Café
- "The Sad Café", a song by The Eagles, featured on their 1979 album The Long Run

== See also ==
- The Ballad of the Sad Café, a 1951 collection of short stories by Carson McCullers, which includes a novella, also called The Ballad of the Sad Cafe
  - The Ballad of the Sad Café, a 1963 play by Edward Albee based on the novella by Carson McCullers
    - The Ballad of the Sad Café (film), a 1991 film directed by Simon Callow, based on the play by Edward Albee
