= A Groovy Kind of Love =

1965 song by Diane & Annita

"Groovy Kind of Love"

Song by Diane & Annita

from the EP One by One
- Released: 1965
- Length: 2:02
- Label: Disques Vogue
- Composer: Muzio Clementi
- Lyricists: Carole Bayer Sager; Toni Wine

"A Groovy Kind of Love" is a song written by Toni Wine and Carole Bayer Sager based on a melody by the classical composer Muzio Clementi.

The original rendition was recorded by American singing duo Diane & Annita and released as "Groovey Kind of Love" on the French EP One by One, in 1965. It has since been recorded by numerous artists, with the Mindbenders and Phil Collins releasing successful versions.

== Background ==
"A Groovy Kind of Love" consists of lyrics written by Bayer Sager and Wine, with music by Muzio Clementi. Composition of the song took place at Bayer Sager's home in New York City, a few blocks away from the Brill Building and 1650 Broadway. Those buildings housed numerous music publishing companies and record labels, including Wine and Bayer Sager's label, Allegro Music (later Screen Gems); the buildings also contained facilities for songwriting and composition. However, Bayer Sager's residence was preferred because it was more comfortable, and more private. Wine composed the music, and Bayer Sager wrote the lyrics.

The title was an early use of the slang word "groovy", and both women were interested in using the word because they recognized it as new and "happening". Wine said, "Carole came up with 'Groovy kinda... groovy kinda... groovy...' and we're all just saying, 'Kinda groovy, kinda groovy, kinda...' and I don't exactly know who came up with "Love", but it was 'Groovy kind of love'. And we did it. We wrote it in 20 minutes. It was amazing. Just flew out of our mouths, and at the piano, it was a real quick and easy song to write."

The melody is from the rondo from Muzio Clementi's Sonatina, Opus 36, No. 5 that was published in 1797. Even though Wine and Sager claim full songwriting credits, they mainly wrote the lyrics and just slightly modified Clementi's music. Bayer Sager originally pitched the song to pop star Lesley Gore in early 1965, but Gore's producer at the time, Shelby Singleton, rejected it, as he found the word "groovy" too slangy.

== The Mindbenders version ==
"A Groovy Kind of Love"

Single by the Mindbenders

from the album The Mindbenders
- B-side: "Love Is Good"
- Released: December 10, 1965
- Recorded: 1965
- Studio: Philips (London)
- Genre: Soul-pop
- Length: 1:59
- Label: Fontana
- Songwriters: Carole Bayer Sager; Toni Wine
- Producer: Jack Baverstock

The Mindbenders singles chronology
"She Needs Love" (1965)	"A Groovy Kind of Love" (1965)	"Can't Live with You, Can't Live Without You" (1966)

Official audio
- "A Groovy Kind of Love" on YouTube

Wayne Fontana and the Mindbenders had enjoyed a cross-Atlantic hit with the song "The Game of Love", which topped the Billboard Hot 100 and reached number two in the UK's Record Retailer. However, towards autumn of 1965 Fontana suddenly left the band to embark on a solo career. The trio continued performing however, with guitarist Eric Stewart, later of 10cc, taking the role of lead vocalist. Shelby Singleton handed the song "A Groovy Kind of Love" to the group after deciding not to record it with Lesley Gore. However, in an interview with Keith Altham from New Musical Express, Mindbenders bassist Bob Lang claimed he found a demo of "A Groovy Kind Of Love" on their manager Danny Betesh's desk. Alternatively, other sources claim Jack McGraw, who ran the Screen Gems offices in London, discovered the song and thought it was a perfect match for Stewart's voice.

It was recorded with lead vocal by Eric Stewart and vocal backing consisting of Lang, drummer Ric Rothwell and a female singer in 1965 with Jack Baverstock producing. The single was released in the United Kingdom by Fontana Records on December 10, 1965, as the trio's first single without Wayne Fontana. According to Lang, the single initially failed to take off due to the Christmas rush, but eventually charted. It entered the Record Retailer chart on January 19, 1966, at number 34 before peaking at number two on March 16. It was kept from the number one spot by "These Boots Are Made for Walkin'" by Nancy Sinatra. It exited the chart on April 20 at a position of 37 after spending 14 weeks on the chart. In the US, the single entered the Billboard Hot 100 on April 10 at a position of 78, before reaching its peak of number two on May 28, 1966, a position it would hold for two weeks. "When a Man Loves a Woman" by Percy Sledge kept the song from reaching the top spot. It exited on July 9 at a position of 44 after spending 13 weeks on the chart.

Upon the single reaching the top ten in the US, Toni Wine phoned her mother, stating that she "was quitting her job" due to the success. Coincidentally, it reached number one on the Cashbox Top 100 and in Record World on the day of her nineteenth birthday, June 4. Pre-orders for the single were estimated to be 250 thousand copies in the UK alone and it would go on to sell over a million copies there in total. It was the trio's only top-fifty single in the US, which has led them to being labeled a one-hit wonder there. "A Groovy Kind of Love" is also credited with bringing the word "groovy" back into the mainstream vocabulary of the 1960s. According to Randy McNutt, in the modern day, "many excellent songs are dated just by one reference to the word 'groovy'" (such as "Groovin'" by The Young Rascals).

It was favorably reviewed in the press upon release. Writing for New Musical Express, Derek Johnson states that it was a "commendable first disc", stating it to be an "attractively harmonized rockaballad". However, he also states that the record "needs a few more spins" in order to register and claims that he was uncertain if it would become a hit. In Cashbox magazine, the staff writer describes the single as a "soft, slow telling of a touching love tale", with "sweet sweeping" orchestration. Following the single's success, it was issued on the Mindbenders eponymous debut album in the UK, while it was the title track of said album in the US.

=== Charts ===
==== Weekly charts ====
Chart (1966)	Peak position
Australia (Kent Music Report)	23
Canada Top Singles (RPM)	4
Ireland (IRMA)	9
Netherlands (Dutch Top 40)	39
New Zealand (Listener)	4
Singapore (RIAS)	3
South Africa (Springbok)	10
UK Singles (OCC)	2
US Billboard Hot 100	2
US Cash Box Top 100	1
US Record World 100 Top Pops	1

==== Year-end charts ====
Chart (1966)	Rank
UK Singles (OCC)	42
US Billboard Top 100	34
US Cash Box Top 100	6
US Record World Singles	7

== Phil Collins version ==
"A Groovy Kind of Love"

Single by Phil Collins

from the album Buster: The Original Motion Picture Soundtrack
- B-side: "Big Noise"
- Released: August 22, 1988
- Genre: Pop
- Length: 3:30
- Label: Virgin
- Songwriters: Carole Bayer Sager; Toni Wine
- Producers: Phil Collins; Anne Dudley

Phil Collins singles chronology
"In the Air Tonight" (1988)	"A Groovy Kind of Love" (1988)	"Two Hearts" (1988)

Music video
- "A Groovy Kind of Love" on YouTube

English drummer, singer-songwriter, record producer, and actor Phil Collins recorded a new version of "A Groovy Kind of Love" in 1988. He had originally suggested the song as a good one for collaborator Stephen Bishop to record, with Collins producing. While filming the movie Buster (1988), Collins suggested the song as a potential love theme for the title character and his wife. He recorded a demo as a guide for the producers, only to find out later his demo had actually been used in the film. Collins had initially expressed reservations about being featured on the soundtrack during the film, but relented due to feeling it worked well for the scene. He subsequently recorded a full version of the song, co-produced by Anne Dudley. This version was originally released on Buster: The Original Motion Picture Soundtrack. It subsequently appeared on the compilation albums Hits, Love Songs: A Compilation... Old and New, and The Singles. A live performance appeared on his Serious Hits... Live! album.

Unlike the Mindbenders' version, which is an upbeat guitar-based pop song, Collins' is a slow ballad with a prominent keyboard and strings. Released as a single, it reached No. 1 on both the U.S. and UK charts, becoming Collins' only single to top the charts in both countries; it was his last No. 1 single in the UK. The single was certified silver in the UK by the British Phonographic Industry. It also reached No. 1 on the US Adult Contemporary chart. It had the longest chart stay of any of Collins' singles on the US Hot 100 at twenty-five weeks. The song earned Collins a Grammy Award nomination for Best Pop Vocal Performance, Male in 1989.

The TV series New Girl featured the Phil Collins version in the episodes "Wedding" (2011) and "The Curse of the Pirate Bride" (2018).

=== Critical reception ===
Pan-European magazine Music & Media described Collins' version as "a slushy version of the original '66 hit of the Mindbenders."

=== Personnel ===
- Phil Collins: vocals, keyboard, drums
- Orchestra conducted by Anne Dudley

=== Charts ===
==== Weekly charts ====
Chart (1988)	Peak position
Australia (ARIA)	2
Austria (Ö3 Austria Top 40)	6
Belgium (Ultratop 50 Flanders)	1
Canada Retail Singles (The Record)	1
Canada Top Singles (RPM)	1
Denmark (IFPI)	1
Europe (Eurochart Hot 100)	1
Finland (Suomen virallinen lista)	7
France (SNEP)	15
Ireland (IRMA)	1
Italy (Musica e dischi)	2
Italy Airplay (Music & Media)	2
Netherlands (Dutch Top 40)	1
Netherlands (Single Top 100)	2
New Zealand (Recorded Music NZ)	3
Norway (VG-lista)	2
Portugal (AFP)	1
South Africa (Springbok Radio)	1
Sweden (Sverigetopplistan)	5
Switzerland (Schweizer Hitparade)	1
UK Singles (Official Charts)	1
UK Airplay (Music & Media)	2
US Billboard Hot 100	1
US Adult Contemporary (Billboard)	1
West Germany (GfK)	3
Zimbabwe (ZIMA)	2

==== Year-end charts ====
Chart (1988)	Position
Australia (ARIA)	20
Belgium (Ultratop)	10
Canada Top Singles (RPM)	7
Europe (Eurochart Hot 100)	17
Netherlands (Dutch Top 40)	16
Netherlands (Single Top 100)	20
New Zealand (RIANZ)	31
UK Singles (OCC)	7
US Billboard Hot 100	29
West Germany (Media Control)	40

Chart (1989)	Position
Australia (ARIA)	79
West Germany (Media Control)	64

=== Certifications ===
Region	Certification	Certified units/sales
Germany (BVMI)	Gold	250,000^{^}
New Zealand (RMNZ)	Gold	15,000^{‡}
Sweden (GLF)	Gold	25,000^{^}
Switzerland (IFPI Switzerland)	Gold	25,000^{^}
United Kingdom (BPI)	Silver	250,000^{^}
United States (RIAA)	Gold	500,000^{^}
^{^} Shipments figures based on certification alone.^{‡} Sales+streaming figures based on certification alone.

== Other notable versions ==
- In 1966, Petula Clark released a cover version that was a Top 10 hit in South Africa and Rhodesia.
- In 1977, Les Gray released a cover which reached No. 32 in the UK.
