= It's Just a Little Bit Too Late =

Song written by Clint Ballard Jr.

"It's Just a Little Bit Too Late" is a song written by Clint Ballard Jr. and Les Ledo, which was originally recorded by Clyde McPhatter in 1963. A British beat group named the Druids would release their version in 1964 before the definitive version by Wayne Fontana and the Mindbenders was recorded and released as a single in 1965. Their version was the second of three songs by Clint Ballard Jr. that the group recorded together with "The Game of Love" and "She Needs Love". Their rendition of the song reached number 20 in the UK's Record Retailer but failed to emulate the success of their previous single "The Game of Love", only reaching number 45 on the Billboard Hot 100.

== Background ==
Clint Ballard Jr. wrote the song together with Les Ledo, an American songwriter who previously had written the chart hit "Cotton Candy" for Al Hirt under the pseudonym Russ Damon; it brought him success as a songwriter, with it reaching number 13 on the Billboard Hot 100 in 1964. Clint Ballard Jr. had on the hand enjoyed success as a songwriter since the late 1950s, writing several top-ten hits for various acts, including Frankie Avalon's "Ginger Bread" in 1958 which reached number nine in the charts that year. He had also enjoyed success with "The Game of Love", a song he gave to Wayne Fontana and the Mindbenders to record; it topped the American chart and reached number two in the UK. Being two established songwriters, the pair decided to sit down and write, with the result becoming "It's Just a Little Bit Too Late". It was one of only two songs they wrote together, the other being "How Long Is So Long" in 1965.

The suspected first version of the song was recorded by the Drifters frontman Clyde McPhatter in the year 1963. McPhatter's version features prominent claves in the backing which also largely consists of a female backing along with a brass quartet. However, it i unclear whether or not his version actually got released as there is no information available. It would tie in with the year Ballard Jr. and Ledo copyrighted the song in 1963. The first released version of the song were from a British merseybeat band named the Druids, who featured Gearie Kenworthy of the Knack. Their version was released as their final and second single on 8 May 1964 through Parlophone Records.

== Wayne Fontana and the Mindbenders version ==
"It's Just a Little Bit Too Late"

Single by Wayne Fontana and the Mindbenders

from the album Eric, Rick, Wayne And Bob — It's Wayne Fontana And The Mindbenders
- B-side: "Long Time Comin'"
- Released: 4 June 1965
- Recorded: 1965
- Studio: Philips (London)
- Genre: Beat
- Length: 2:17
- Label: Fontana
- Songwriters: Clint Ballard Jr.; Les Ledo
- Producer: Jack Baverstock

Wayne Fontana and the Mindbenders singles chronology
"The Game of Love" (1965)	"It's Just a Little Bit Too Late" (1965)	"She Needs Love" (1965)

Wayne Fontana and the Mindbenders had by this point become acquainted with Clint Ballard Jr. as a songwriter, having previously recorded his song "The Game of Love" in 1964. When released as a single the following year, it reached number one on Billboard Hot 100 and number two on the Record Retailer chart during the spring of 1965. This led to a tour of the United Kingdom on which they most likely picked up the song while performing together with the Hollies, who had had a number one hit with the Clint Ballard Jr. composition "I'm Alive" that year. Nonetheless, they liked the song well enough to record it, which they did at Philips Studio in London with Fontana Records head producer Jack Baverstock. It was eventually released as a single on 4 June 1965 with "Long Time Comin'" as its B-side.

"It's Just a Little Bit Too Late" entered the UK singles chart on 23 June 1965 at a position of 47 before peaking at number 20 on 14 July. It soon thereafter exited the chart on 4 August at a position of 50 after spending only seven weeks on the chart. In the US, the single entered the charts on 12 June at a position of number 88, before peaking at 45 on 24 July. It dropped from the charts on the following week with a position of number 59, after spending eight weeks on it. In Cash Box magazine it reached number 52, while also reaching number 44 in Record World. Internationally, it was also commercially successful, though not on the level of "The Game of Love". In Canada's RPM magazine, it reached number nine, while it reached number 55 on the Australian charts.

Upon release, it received primarily positive reviews. In Billboard magazine, it is considered a "No. 1 rhythm contender", noting the previous collaboration with Clint Ballard Jr. In Cash Box it is referred to as "a bright, funky-styled ditty" while simultaneously noting the lyrics of the song. In Music Business magazine it was considered a pick of the week while Record World describes it as "fast-moving follow-up item". Both sides of the single were featured on the group's second studio album Eric, Rick, Wayne And Bob — It's Wayne Fontana And The Mindbenders which was released in October 1965.

Personnel

- Wayne Fontana – lead vocals, tambourine
- Bob Lang – bass guitar, backing vocals
- Eric Stewart – lead guitar
- Ric Rothwell – drums

Charts

Chart performance for "It's Just a Little Bit Too Late"
Chart (1965)	Peak position
Australia (Kent Music Report)	55
Canada (RPM) Top Singles	9
UK (Disc Weekly)	30
UK (Record Retailer)	20
US Billboard Hot 100	45
US Cashbox 100	52
US Record World 100 Top Pops	44

== See also ==
- The Mindbenders discography
