= Girls (1980 film) =

1980 film by Just Jaeckin

- Directed by: Just Jaeckin
- Written by: Just Jaeckin; Jean-Luc Voulfow
- Produced by: Léon Zuratas; Claude Giroux; Georg M. Reuther
- Cinematography: Claude Agostini
- Edited by: Yves Langlois
- Music by: Duncan Mackay; Eric Stewart
- Distributed by: Gaumont Distribution
- Release date: 7 May 1980 (France)
- Running time: 95 minutes
- Countries: France; West Germany; Canada
- Language: French

Girls is a 1980 film directed by Just Jaeckin. The film is about four teenage friends who experience the trials and tribulations of maturing into women. The film was a French, West German and Canadian co-production, with funding from the French Society of International Co-productions, FFF - French Movies (Paris), The Caneuram Films (Montreal), TV13 Filmproduktion (Munich).

== Cast ==
- Anne Parillaud as Catherine Flavin
- Zoé Chauveau as Annie
- Charlotte Walior as Suzanne, Betty's sister
- Isabelle Mejias as Betty Darquier
- Christophe Bourseiller as Bernard
- Étienne Chicot as The Host

== Production ==
Girls was shot in Montreal in Canada and in Normandy and Paris in France. The soundtrack for the film was recorded by Eric Stewart of 10cc.

== Release ==
Girls was released in Paris on 7 May 1980, and on 27 June 1980 in West Germany. The film was shown for 9 weeks in Paris. In Canada, the film premiered in Montreal on 2 October 1981. The film was distributed by Les Productions Karim in Montreal and released in both French and an English dub.
