= Misplaced Ideals =

1978 album by Sad Café

- Original vinyl cover by Storm Thorgerson/Hipgnosis

Studio album by Sad Café
- Released: 14 April 1978
- Studios: Sawmills, Golant, UK; AIR, London
- Genre: Pop rock
- Length: 42:06
- Label: RCA
- Producer: John Punter

Sad Café chronology
Fanx Ta-Ra (1977)	Misplaced Ideals (1978)	Misplaced Ideals (1978)

Alternative cover
- Reissue vinyl cover

Misplaced Ideals is the second studio album by English rock band Sad Café, released in April 1978 by RCA Records. Despite no singles being released from the album and its lack of commercial success, it peaked at number 50 on the UK Albums Chart. The album wasn't released in North America, where instead it was decided that a compilation album, also titled Misplaced Ideals, of the band's first two albums be released.

== Reception ==
Reviewing the album for Record Mirror, Mary Ann Ellis gave the album 3 out of 5 and wrote "Sad Cafe are going to need all the help they can get selling this record which is probably why they've employed shock tactics on the cover... guaranteed to stop record shop browsers in their racks. 'Misplaced Ideals' is just another recruit to that, growing army of average albums. Not bad, not good. Competent but unexciting eliciting neither orgasms nor groans. Just another variation (or is it?) on the same well worn (out) theme. There are some good (standard) rocky numbers which are spoilt by being overlong and afflicted with tedious sax and guitar solos. Self-indulgence rules (and ruins) here. Sad Cafe fall into a kind of no band'sland as far as audience appeal goes. They're too sophisticated for the heavy brigade and their style is still not distinctive enough to earn them much of a cult following. And their songs at the moment have little commercial appeal."

== Cover art ==
The original album cover featured a photograph of a man pulling off a rubber face mask, only to reveal another face underneath. The striking image was created for RCA by Storm Thorgerson. The photograph of a distorted rubber face being pulled apart proved controversial, and RCA decided to re-release the album for the European market with a different cover, a picture of a family of sunbathers walking on a beach. The North American release featured an illustration of a woman holding a cocktail, and in Japan, the album was released with a black cover showing only the eye of the face mask.

== Track listing ==
No.	Title	Writer(s)	Length
1.	"Restless"	John Stimpson, Paul Young, Ian Wilson, Ashley Mulford	4:38
2.	"Here Come the Clowns"	Young	4:00
3.	"Run Home Girl"	Young, Wilson	6:04
4.	"Let Love Speak for Itself"	Young, Stimpson, Wilson	6:08
5.	"No Place to Go"	Wilson	4:51
6.	"Mario"	Young, Vic Emerson, Wilson	3:45
7.	"Relax"	Young	3:17
8.	"Feel Like Dying"	Young	4:09
9.	"On With the Show"	Young, Wilson, Emerson, Mulford, Stimpson	5:14
Total length:			42:06

== Personnel ==
Sad Café

- Paul Young – lead vocals, percussion
- Ashley Mulford – lead guitar
- Vic Emerson – keyboards
- John Stimpson – bass guitar, backing vocals
- Ian Wilson – electric guitar, acoustic guitar, backing vocals, percussion
- Tony Cresswell – drums

Additional personnel

- Lenni Zaksen – saxophone
- John Punter – additional percussion
- Doreen Chanter, Irene Chanter, Liza Strike – additional vocals on "Feel Like Dying"
- Nigel Walker, Jon Walls – assistant engineers
- Vic Emerson – strings arrangement and synthesisation
- Iain Scott – photography of live band
- Hipgnosis – sleeve design and photography (for original album release)

== North American album ==
Misplaced Ideals

Compilation album by Sad Café
- Released: November 1978
- Genre: Pop rock
- Length: 44:20
- Label: A&M
- Producer: John Punter

Sad Café chronology
Misplaced Ideals (1978)	Misplaced Ideals (1978)	Facades (1979)

Professional ratings
Review scores
Source	Rating
AllMusic	4.5/5 stars
Robert Christgau	C−

This album was only released in the US and Canada and is a compilation of songs from Sad Café's first two studio albums, Fanx Ta-ra and Misplaced Ideals, neither of which were released there. It was released in November 1978 by A&M Records. "Run Home Girl" and "Feel Like Dying" were released as singles, with the former reaching number 71 on the Billboard Hot 100 in 1979. The album also charted at number 94 on the Billboard 200. "Run Home Girl" is also a shorter, edited version of the original UK release.

The album was reissued on CD in 2008 by Renaissance Records and the 2011 album download included 4 bonus tracks, which were the four songs from the original UK release of the album not included on this compilation.

Reviewing this LP, Robert Christgau wrote in Christgau's Record Guide: Rock Albums of the Seventies (1981): "In which the decade's most paradoxical, characteristic, and disgusting pop-music synthesis—combining hard rock's compulsive riff energy with MOR's smooth determination to displease no one—is achieved without recourse to jazz rhythms or semiclassical decoration. Misplaced ideals my ass—they threw them down the deepest hole they could find."

=== Track listing ===
No.	Title	Writer(s)	Length
1.	"Restless"	John Stimpson, Paul Young, Ian Wilson, Ashley Mulford	4:36
2.	"Here Come the Clowns"	Young	4:00
3.	"Run Home Girl"	Young, Wilson	4:57
4.	"Black Rose"	Young, Stimpson	4:36
5.	"I Believe (Love Will Survive)"	Young	4:29
6.	"Babylon"	Young	3:40
7.	"Shellshock"	Young, Wilson, Vic Emerson, Mulford, Stimpson	3:12
8.	"Hungry Eyes"	Young, Emerson	5:26
9.	"Feel Like Dying"	Young	4:09
10.	"On With the Show"	Young, Wilson, Emerson, Mulford, Stimpson	5:15
Total length:			44:20

2011 download bonus tracks:

No.	Title	Writer(s)	Length
11.	"Let Love Speak for Itself"	Young, Stimpson, Wilson	6:09
12.	"Mario"	Young, Emerson, Stimpson	4:51
13.	"No Place to Go"	Wilson	3:44
14.	"Relax"	Young	3:19

== Charts ==
Chart performance for Misplaced Ideals
Chart (1979)	Peak position
UK Albums (Official Charts)	50
US Billboard 200	94
