= Groovy =

Colloquialism popular in 1950s, 60s and 70s

Groovy (or, less commonly, groovie or groovey) is a slang colloquialism popular during the late 1950s to early 1970s. It is roughly synonymous with words such as "excellent", "fashionable", or "amazing", depending on context.

== History ==
The word originated in the jazz culture of the 1920s, in which it referred to the “groove” of a piece of music (its rhythm and “feel”), plus the response felt by its listeners. It can also reference the physical groove of a record in which the pick-up needle runs. Radio disc jockeys would announce playing “good grooves, hot grooves, cool grooves, etc.” when introducing a record about to play.

Recorded use of the word in its slang context has been found dating back to September 30, 1941, when it was used on the Fibber McGee and Molly radio show; band leader Billy Mills used it to describe his summer vacation. In the 1941 song “Let Me Off Uptown” by Gene Krupa, Anita O’Day invites Roy Eldridge to “… come here Roy and get groovy”. The 1942 film Miss Annie Rooney features a teenage Shirley Temple using the term as she impresses Dickie Moore with her jitterbug moves and knowledge of jive. In the 1945 film A Thousand and One Nights, Phil Silvers uses the term to describe an ostentatiously bejeweled turban.

It has been found in print as early as 1946, in Really the Blues, the autobiography of jazz saxophonist Mezz Mezzrow. The word appears in advertising spots for the 1947 film Miracle on 34th Street, and in the same year the phrase “Everything’s groovy” was included on a 78 rpm recording of “Open The Door, Richard” sung by Walter Brown with Tiny Grimes Sextet.

== Music ==
Starting in the 1940s, variations of the word were used in the titles of many popular songs, including:

- "Groovin' High'", a 1945 song by Dizzy Gillespie.
- "Movin' and Groovin'", a 1962 song by Sam Cooke.
- "A Groovy Kind of Love", a song written by Toni Wine and Carole Bayer Sager in 1964 and popularized a year later by The Mindbenders. Also recorded in 1988 by Phil Collins.
- "We've Got a Groovey [sic] Thing Goin'", the flip side of the 1965 hit single "The Sounds of Silence" by Simon & Garfunkel
- "The 59th Street Bridge Song (Feelin' Groovy)", a 1966 song also by Simon & Garfunkel
- "Somebody Groovy", a song from the 1966 debut album If You Can Believe Your Eyes and Ears by The Mamas & the Papas
- "Groovin'", a 1967 song by the Young Rascals
- "Groovin' Is Easy", a 1968 song by the Electric Flag
- "Workin' On a Groovy Thing", a 1968 song by Neil Sedaka
- "Groovy Grubworm", a 1969 song by Harlow Wilcox
- "Groovy Situation", a 1970 hit by Gene "The Duke of Earl" Chandler
- "Groovin' With Mr. Bloe", a 1970 hit by Mr. Bloe
- "Groovy Movies", a song by The Kinks released in 1973 on The Great Lost Kinks Album
- "Party is A Groovy Thing", a 1975 song by People's Choice
- "Groovy People", a 1976 song by Lou Rawls
- "Groovy Times", a 1979 song by The Clash
- "Groovy Train", a 1990 hit single by The Farm

It later made its way into the titles of albums, such as Groovy Decay, a 1982 album by Robyn Hitchcock, and Groovy, Laidback and Nasty, a 1990 album by Cabaret Voltaire. Some bands include the term in their names, such as the Flamin' Groovies, Groovy Aardvark, The Groovy Little Numbers, and Groovy Rednecks.

== Movies, television, and video games ==
An early mainstream use of the word is in the trailer to the 1947 film Miracle on 34th Street, which depicts various viewers' reactions to the film, including a young person who describes it as “groovy.”

The term was also part of the title of a TV program called The Groovy Show, which ran from 1967 to 1970. There was also an American TV cartoon show called Groovie Goolies, which ran from 1970 to 1972.

By the early 1970s, the word was commonplace in American TV advertisements aimed at young audiences, as exemplified by the slogan "Feeling groovy, just had my Cheerios."

An early ironic use of the term appears in the title of the 1974 film The Groove Tube, which satirized the American counterculture of the time.

The term was later used jokingly in films such as Evil Dead II, Army of Darkness, and the Austin Powers films, as well as in the Duke Nukem 3D video game.

== In literature and comic books ==
E. B. White used the term in the 1970 novel The Trumpet of the Swan, which takes place in 1968. "'This is real groovy!' cried a boy in the front seat. 'That bird is as good as Louis Armstrong, the famous trumpet player.'"

The Pete the Cat children’s book series often references the term, both in the characters’ dialogues and in the titles, for example, "Pete the Cat’s Groovy Guide to Kindness".

Marvel Comics produced a Silver Age comic book entitled Groovy, subtitled "Cartoons, gags, jokes". Only three issues were published, dated March, May and July 1967.
