= Fanx Ta-Ra =

Studio album by Sad Café
- Released: September 1977
- Recorded: 1976–77
- Studio: Strawberry Studios, Stockport; The Manor, Shipton-on-Cherwell; Indigo Studios, Manchester
- Genre: Pop rock
- Label: RCA
- Producer: John Punter

Sad Café chronology
Fanx Ta-Ra (1977)	Misplaced Ideals (1978)

Professional ratings
Review scores
Source	Rating
AllMusic	2/5 stars
Encyclopedia of Popular Music	3/5 stars

Fanx Ta-Ra is the first studio album by the English band Sad Café. It was produced and engineered by John Punter and released by RCA Records in September 1977. The album charted at number 56 on the UK Albums Chart. The album was not released in North America; however, a compilation of the band's first two albums was released there in late 1978, titled Misplaced Ideals.

== Track listing ==
No.	Title	Writer(s)	Length
1.	"Babylon"	Paul Young	3:41
2.	"Shellshock"	Young, Ian Wilson, Vic Emerson, Ashley Mulford, John Stimpson	3:14
3.	"Hungry Eyes"	Young, Emerson	5:29
4.	"Shadow on the Wall"	Young, Stimpson	3:48
5.	"Black Rose"	Young, Stimpson	4:38
6.	"The Further Adventures of Mad Alan"	Emerson	1:47
7.	"Fanx Ta-Ra"	Young, Chris Gill	3:05
8.	"Flingus' Holiday"	Tony Cresswell	2:11
9.	"Immortal"	Stimpson, Mulford	3:29
10.	"Sail On"	Emerson, Young	2:56
11.	"Clumbidextrous"	Emerson	3:54
12.	"I Believe (Love Will Survive)"	Young	4:33

== Personnel ==
Sad Café

- Paul Young – lead vocals, percussion
- Ashley Mulford – lead guitar
- Tony Cresswell – drums, percussion, backing vocals
- John Stimpson – bass guitar, acoustic guitar, backing vocals
- Vic Emerson – keyboards
- Ian Wilson – guitar, backing vocals

Additional personnel

- Lenni Zaksen, Chris Gill – saxophones
- Dave Hassle – cabasa, bell tree
- John Punter – engineer, producer
- Vic Emerson – strings arrangement and synthesisation
- Gered Mankowitz – photography
