= Bell End (disambiguation) =

Bell End is a village in Worcestershire, England, UK.

Bell End, bellend or bell ends may also refer to:

- bell-end, the glans penis, tip of a penis, in British slang
- "BE11 END", a car number plate featured in Top Gear (2002 TV series)
- "Bell Ends", a 1981 song by Sad Café from the album Live in Concert (Sad Café album)

== See also ==
- "Christmas Time (Don't Let the Bells End)", 2003 song by The Darkness
