= Sad Café (album) =

Studio album by Sad Café
- Released: 3 October 1980
- Studios: Strawberry Studios South, Dorking
- Genre: Pop rock
- Length: 41:44
- Labels: RCA; Swan Song
- Producer: Eric Stewart

Sad Café chronology
Facades (1979)	Sad Café (1980)	Live in Concert (1981)

Singles from Sad Café
- 1. "La-Di-Da" Released: September 1980; 2. "I'm in Love Again" Released: December 1980

Professional ratings
Review scores
Source	Rating
AllMusic	3/5 stars
The Encyclopedia of Popular Music	3/5 stars
Record Mirror	4/5 stars

Sad Café is the fourth studio album by English rock band Sad Café, released in October 1980 by RCA Records.

== Release ==
In the UK, two singles were released, "La-Di-Da" and "I'm in Love Again" both of which charted on the UK Singles Chart. On some editions of the album, "Love Today" and "I'm in Love Again" are swapped around on the track listing.

The album failed to continue the success of the band's previous album and it charted at number 46 on the UK Album Charts. It was also certified silver by the BPI in February 1981. In the US, the album was released by Swan Song Records and it charted at number 160 on the Billboard 200.

The album was reissued on CD in 2009 in the US by Renaissance Records.

== Reception ==
Reviewing the album for Record Mirror, Paul Sexton described it as "more of the same. Which is fine, as the band is still relatively young... and there's so much diversity in their music, that it'll take quite a while before they come to the bottom of that particular well. The album doesn't feature any ballads in the form of 'Every Day Hurts', and probably for that reason, won't spawn any hits that big. But 'La Di Da' is already making an impression, and it's indicative of the midpace, happy/sad ambivalence the band specialises in." "It's also good to see vocalist Paul Young, the band's chief lyricist, being able to vary the content of his lyrics, and providing a contrast to the usual love-gone-right and love-gone-wrong fodder".

== Track listing ==
All lyrics are written by Paul Young, except where noted.

No.	Title	Lyrics	Music	Length
1.	"La-Di-Da"		John Stimpson, Young	5:00
2.	"Digital Daydream Blues"		Ashley Mulford, Young, Vic Emerson	4:53
3.	"What Am I Gonna Do"	Ian Wilson	Wilson	4:40
4.	"Keep It from the Troops"		Sad Café	6:12
5.	"Love Today"	Wilson, Young	Sad Café	4:42
6.	"Losin' You"	Mulford	Mulford	3:54
7.	"Dreamin'"		Mulford, Stimpson, Young, Emerson	4:13
8.	"No Favours No Way"		Stimpson, Young	3:57
9.	"I'm in Love Again"	Wilson, Young	Wilson, Emerson	4:13
Total length:				41:44

== Personnel ==
Sad Café

- Paul Young – lead vocals, percussion, congas
- Ashley Mulford – lead guitar, slide guitar, vocals
- Ian Wilson – electric guitar, acoustic guitar, vocals, percussion
- John Stimpson – bass guitar, vocals
- Vic Emerson – piano, synthesizer
- Dave Irving – drums, vocals, percussion
- Lenni Zaksen – saxophone, vocals

Technical

- Eric Stewart – engineer, producer
- Alwyn Clayden – art direction
- Vic Emerson – strings arrangement and synthesisation
- Lenni Zaksen – horns arrangement
- John Shaw – photography
- Recorded at Strawberry Studios South in Dorking and mastered at Strawberry Mastering in London

== Charts ==
Chart (1980)	Peak position
Swedish Albums (Sverigetopplistan)	28
UK Albums (Official Charts)	46
US Billboard 200	160
