= Mandalaband =

- Origin: United Kingdom
- Genres: Symphonic rock
- Years active: 1974–1982, 2003–present
- Labels: Chrysalis Records; Legend Records
- Members: Alison Carter; Ashley Mulford; Barbara Macanas; Briony Macanas; Craig Fletcher; David Clements; David Rohl; Jose Manuel Medina; Kim Turner; Lynda Howard; Marc Atkinson; Morten Vestergaard; Pablo Lato; Sergio Garcia; Troy Donockley; Woolly Wolstenholme
- Past members: Dave Durant; Eric Stewart; Graham Gouldman; John Lees; John Stimpson; Justin Hayward; Kevin Godley; Les Holroyd; Dan Hartwell; Lol Creme; Maddy Prior; Mel Pritchard; Noel Redding; Paul Young; Ritchie Close; Steve Broomhead; Tony Cresswell; Vic Emerson; Friday Brown

Mandalaband is a progressive rock band formed in England in 1974. The band is led by David Rohl who writes, arranges, mixes and produces their material. Rohl is also a controversial Egyptologist, once featured on the London Sunday Times front page with the caption "the real Indiana Jones".

== History ==
=== 1970s ===
In 1974, Rohl had taken an interest in Tibetan Buddhism and the Tibetans’ resistance to the Chinese invasion in the 1950s. In the process he had begun writing what became a 20 minute musical piece titled "Om Mani Padme Hum", and began to build up a team of musicians in order to record the first movement of the piece. These musicians evolved into a band and started to write other songs about the same subject. Demo tapes soon interested Chrysalis Records, who then signed the band.

Chrysalis wanted the band to gel together as a live outfit so that the recording would have a ‘band feel’ rather than just a bunch of session musicians playing in a sterile studio environment. Prior to recording an album, the label sent them out as the opening act for Robin Trower’s first major UK tour, playing to 2,000 fans each night for about twenty shows. The band played all the tracks from what would become their first album (including the whole twenty minutes of "Om Mani Padme Hum"). The live band consisted of David Rohl on piano, Vic Emerson on Hammond, Moog and Claviolines, Ashley Mulford on guitar, John Stimpson on bass, Tony Cresswell on drums and Dave Durant on lead vocals.

Mandalaband's first album, simply titled Mandalaband was released by Chrysalis Records in 1975. It included the 20 minute track entitled "Om Mani Padme Hum" – a four-movement work for rock band and choir. The lineup for this album were lead singer Dave Durant (accompanied by the London Chorale), and original band members Vic Emerson (keyboards), Ashley Mulford (guitars), Tony Cresswell (drums) and John Stimpson (bass), with David Rohl as founder, writer and studio engineer for the band.

David Rohl left the band on the first day of recording the album after having been removed by Chrysalis as producer/engineer and replaced by another producer. When the tapes were delivered to the label however, Rohl was asked to remix the album as the record company executives were unhappy with the results. Although the album was released and well received, Rohl was always dissatisfied with the outcome stating "I did not record the actual instruments, so the album never got close to the quality I had envisaged and feel could have been achieved".

The band went its separate ways the following year, and David Rohl went to work at Indigo Sound in Manchester at the time, having left Mandalaband. This studio was closely connected to the TV and film industries and he was asked to write the music for a proposed film version of The Lord of the Rings. This original version was to be made in Ireland but the producers never managed to raise all the necessary funding to undertake such a massive project. "The Eye of Wendor" overture was written as the title music for the movie, and the track that came to be called "Silesandre" was originally entitled "Black Riders". When the movie production was cancelled Rohl decided to write "The Eye of Wendor" story and compose a whole triple album of music for it. He did not have a working band at that point, so he called on his friends in the UK music industry to help out, and they played most of the instruments and sang the vocals while Rohl engineered and produced the recordings.

The result was The Eye of Wendor – a concept album based on a Tolkienesque fantasy set in a world of warlocks, witches, battling heroes, and a magical gemstone of supernatural power. Vocalists on this album included: Justin Hayward, Eric Stewart, Maddy Prior, Graham Gouldman, Kevin Godley, Lol Creme, Friday Brown and Paul Young. Musicians included: Ritchie Close, David Rohl and Woolly Wolstenholme on keys; Noel Redding, Les Holroyd, Graham Gouldman on bass; Steve Broomhead and John Lees on guitars; Kim Turner and Mel Pritchard on drums & percussion; plus orchestration from the Halle orchestra for all the classical bits. The Eye of Wendor was released in 1978.

The overture of The Eye of Wendor became the trademark closing theme in the Norwegian comedy adventure TV series about Brødrene Dal, in all four series. The three first series used Mandalaband's own version, the fourth series used a new rendition recorded by the Norwegian Radio Orchestra (Kringkastingsorkestret).

=== 2000s ===
Rohl left music in the 1980s to pursue his interest in Egyptology. But eventually he felt that he still had ‘unfinished business’ with his music. He moved to Spain in 2003 and built a studio on top of a mountain overlooking the Mediterranean Sea. He then assembled a new Mandalaband consisting of both new and former band members, and began recording new material.

The musicians and singers who played their part in this new Mandalaband project were: David Rohl (writer, engineer, producer, vocalist and keyboards), Ashley Mulford (guitars and vocals), Troy Donockley (Uilleann pipes, whistles, guitars and bouzouki), Marc Atkinson (acoustic guitar and vocals), Jose Manuel Medina (keyboards, Spanish guitar and backing vocals), Sergio Garcia (acoustic guitar), Kim Turner (drums, percussion and mandolin), David Clements (bass guitar), Craig Fletcher (bass guitar and backing vocals), Morten Vestergaard (bass guitar), Pablo Lato (bass guitar), Alison Carter (backing vocals), Lynda Howard (backing vocals), and Barbara & Briony Macanas (backing vocals). Woolly Wolstenholme (keyboards and vocals) who died during the last stages of recording AD - Sangreal, and that album is dedicated to his memory.

This line-up of Mandalaband released BC – Ancestors in 2009 and a follow-up AD – Sangreal in July 2011. The double CD Resurrection (a completely re-mixed and re-mastered special edition of the two original 1970s albums) was released in November 2010.

== Discography ==
=== Studio albums ===
- Mandalaband (1975)
- The Eye of Wendor (1978)
- BC – Ancestors (2009)
- AD – Sangreal (2011)

=== Compilation albums ===
- Resurrection (2010)
