= Girls (Eric Stewart album) =

Studio album by Eric Stewart
- Released: May 1980
- Recorded: October – November 1979
- Venue: Strawberry Studio South
- Genre: Rock
- Length: 36:35
- Label: Polydor
- Producer: Eric Stewart

Eric Stewart chronology
Girls (1980)	Frooty Rooties (1982)

Singles from Girls
- 1. "Girls" b/w "Discollapse" Released: 1980; 2. "Warm Warm Warm" b/w "Switch Le Bitch" Released: 1980

Professional ratings
Review scores
Source	Rating
AllMusic	2/5 stars

Girls is the first solo album released by Eric Stewart in 1980. It was the soundtrack to the film Girls.

== Overview ==
The album is half instrumental and was mostly co-written by Eric Stewart and then 10cc keyboardist Duncan Mackay. It was recorded during the time of recording of the 10cc's seventh studio album Look Hear? and features contributions from all of the other then 10cc members. The song "Make the Pieces Fit" was originally intended for Look Hear? but was eventually included on Girls. An alternate version of the song "Make the Pieces Fit" was later included on the Stewart's next solo album Frooty Rooties.

"Girls" and "Warm, Warm, Warm" were released as singles. Neither the album nor the singles managed to chart in the Stewart's native UK, however the album charted in Norway.

== Track listing ==
All tracks written by Eric Stewart and Duncan Mackay except where noted

1. "Girls Opening Music" - 3:28
2. "Girls" (Stewart) - 3:18
3. "Disco Grindin'" - 2:09
4. "Switch le Bitch" - 4:26
5. "Aural Exciter" - 1:44
6. "Warm, Warm, Warm" (Stewart) - 3:40
7. "Tonight" - 3:43
8. "Snatch the Gas" - 2:01
9. "Your Touch is Soft" - 2:15
10. "Trouble Shared" - 2:19
11. "Discollapse" - 3:23
12. "Make the Pieces Fit" (Stewart) - 4:09

== Personnel ==
- Eric Stewart - vocals, guitar, bass guitar, grand piano, Fender Rhodes, Moog strings, percussion, clavinet, synthesizer, rhythm box, handclaps, backing vocals, Aural Exciter
- Duncan Mackay - grand piano, Yamaha CS-80, Taurus bass pedals, clavinet, sequencers, synthesizers, pianet, Fender Rhodes, handclaps, Roland Vocoder Strings, choir (except "Girls", "Warm, Warm, Warm" and "Make the Pieces Fit")
- Paul Burgess - drums, percussion, handclaps, congas, maracas (except "Tonight", "Snatch The Gas", "Your Touch Is Soft" and "Trouble Shared")
- Rick Fenn - guitar solo on "Girls", lead guitar "Make the Pieces Fit"
- Graham Gouldman - acoustic guitars, autoharp on "Make the Pieces Fit"
- Stuart Tosh - drums on "Snatch the Gas"
- Simon Phillips - drums on "Tonight"
- Alan Jones - bass guitar on "Tonight"

== Charts ==
Chart (1980)	Peak position
Norwegian VG-lista Albums Chart	32
