= The Game of Love (Wayne Fontana and the Mindbenders song) =

1965 single by Wayne Fontana and the Mindbenders

Single by Wayne Fontana and The Mindbenders

from the album The Game of Love
- B-side: "Since You've Been Gone"
- Released: 22 January 1965
- Recorded: 1964
- Genre: Blues rock; beat; blue-eyed soul
- Length: 2:04
- Label: Fontana
- Songwriter: Clint Ballard Jr.
- Producer: David Anderle

Wayne Fontana and The Mindbenders singles chronology
"Um, Um, Um, Um, Um, Um" (1964)	"The Game of Love" (1965)	"It's Just a Little Bit Too Late" (1965)

Alternative cover

"The Game of Love" is a 1964 song by Wayne Fontana and the Mindbenders, first released as a single from the band's titular album in January 1965 in the United Kingdom, followed by the United States one month later as "Game of Love". The song reached Number 2 on the UK Singles chart and Number 1 on the US Billboard Hot 100 that year. The song also spawned multiple successful cover versions, including a version by Ian "Tex Pistol" Morris that was a Number 1 hit in New Zealand in 1987. The song was also adapted into French by Frank Gérald as "Quand tu es là" ("When you are there") and was recorded by French pop singer Sylvie Vartan, first in July 1965 as the second single off of her 1966 studio album "Il y a deux filles en moi" ("There are two girls in me") that was a hit in French-speaking Belgium, followed by a re-recording in 1990, released as a non-album single, that was a minor hit in France.

== Track listing ==
=== Original version ===
Side A
No.	Title	Writer(s)	Length
1.	"The Game Of Love"	C. Ballard Jr	2:04

Side B
No.	Title	Writer(s)	Length
2.	"Since You've Been Gone"	Eric Stewart, Glyn Ellis, Bob Lang	1:55

=== US re-pressing ===
Side A
No.	Title	Writer(s)	Length
1.	"Game Of Love"	C. Ballard Jr	2:04

Side B
No.	Title	Writer(s)	Length
2.	"One More Time"	Stewart, Ellis	2:06

== Charts ==
The song reached No. 1 on the U.S. Billboard Hot 100 week of April 24, 1965 and No. 2 on the UK Singles Chart in February 1965.

=== Weekly charts ===
Chart (1965)	Peak position
Canada RPM Top Singles	3
Ireland (IRMA)	10
Germany GFK Top Singles	19
South Africa (Springbok)	19
UK Singles (Official Charts Company)	2
US Billboard Hot 100	1
US Cash Box Top 100	1

=== Year-end charts ===
Chart (1965)	Rank
UK	44
US Billboard Hot 100	34
US Cash Box Top 100	53

== Tex Pistol version ==
"The Game of Love"

Single by Tex Pistol

from the album Nobody Else
- B-side: "Boot Heel Drag" (12" only); "W.11 to Whangaroa Bay"
- Released: September 1987
- Genre: Pop rock
- Label: Pagan
- Songwriter: Clint Ballard Jr.
- Producer: Ian Morris

Tex Pistol singles chronology
"The Ballad of Buckskin Bob" (1986)	"The Game of Love" (1987)	"Nobody Else" (1988)

Music video
- "Game of Love" at NZ on Screen

The song was covered in 1987 by New Zealand musician Ian Morris, under the stage name Tex Pistol and was released as the second and penultimate single off of his debut album, "Nobody Else", which was released the following year. The song reached Number 1 on the New Zealand music charts in late September 1987 and was the first of two hits for Morris.

=== Background ===
Morris was looking for a "more commercial" follow up to his Tex Pistol debut single "The Ballad of Buckskin Bob". He had begun work on a cover of The Underdog's "Sitting In The Rain" when advertising music collaborator Jim Hall suggested "The Game of Love" as a good song to cover. Morris "immediately knew how it would sound". He credits its success to "a combination of technology of the time and a good simple song".

The song is notable for its unusual drum sound. Morris had been working on the audio for a card ad at the time. His curiosity piqued by a supplied video clip of a racecar going over a hill, Morris recorded the sound, sped it up, and mixed it with a clip of a snare drum.

The song also features Callie Blood, Morris's later collaborator on advertising jingles, on backing vocals.

=== Track listing ===
Side A
No.	Title	Writer(s)	Length
1.	"The Game of Love"	C. Ballard Jr

Side B
No.	Title	Writer(s)	Length
2.	"Boot Heel Drag" (12" release only)
3.	"W.11 to Whangaroa Bay"	Morris

=== Charting and awards ===
The song went to number 1 on the New Zealand music charts. According to Morris's brother Rikki Morris, the song was a surprise hit and so the 500 pressed copies sold out, meaning that the single hit number one but could not remain there.

The reworking of the song gave Morris a 1987 RIANZ award for best engineer and a nomination for best producer. The song was accompanied by a video by then-teenager Paul Middleditch that was also nominated for best video and is now considered one of the highlights of New Zealand 80s music-video making.

== Sylvie Vartan versions ==
=== Original 1965 version ===
"Quand tu es là"

Single by Sylvie Vartan

from the album Il y a deux filles en moi
- Language: French
- English title: When you are there
- B-side: "Ce jour-là"
- Released: July 1965
- Recorded: Early 1965
- Genre: Pop
- Length: 1:58
- Label: RCA Victor
- Songwriters: Clint Ballard Jr., Frank Gérald

Sylvie Vartan singles chronology
"Cette lettre-là" (1965)	"Quand tu es là" (1965)	"C'était trop beau" (1965)

In 1965, the song was adapted into French by Frank Gérald as Quand tu es là (meaning "When you are there") and performed by French pop singer Sylvie Vartan and was released as a single in July 1965 as the second single off of her 1966 studio album Il y a deux filles en moi ("There are two girls in me"). Vartan's original version peaked at Number 18 on the French Belgian charts in 1965.

=== Charts ===
Chart (1965)	Peak position
Belgium (Ultratop 50 Wallonia)	18

=== 1990 version ===
"Quand tu es là"

Single by Sylvie Vartan
- B-side: "Silver Mac"
- Released: September 1990
- Recorded: 1990
- Genre: Pop
- Length: 1:58
- Label: Philips
- Songwriters: Clint Ballard Jr., Frank Gérald
- Producer: E.D.

Sylvie Vartan singles chronology
"Il pleut sur London" (1990)	"Quand tu es là" (1990)	"Qui tu es" (1992)

Alternative cover

In late 1990, 25 years after the release of Vartan's original recording, Vartan re-recorded the French adaption and released it as a non-album single on Philips Records (the longtime and former label of her ex-husband Johnny Hallyday, of whom Vartan was married to at the time when she released her original recording), produced by Étienne Daho under the moniker "E.D.". Vartan's re-recording was a minor hit on the French charts in early 1991, charting from 9 February to 9 March 1991, peaking at Number 48.

=== Charts ===
Chart (1991)	Peak position
France (SNEP)	48
