= Do Not Bend =

Studio album by Eric Stewart
- Released: April 2003
- Recorded: 1999–2003
- Studios: Templar Studios, France; Astoria Studios, London
- Genre: Pop
- Length: 63:51
- Label: Strawberry Soundtracks
- Producer: Eric Stewart

Eric Stewart chronology
Frooty Rooties (1982)	Do Not Bend (2003)	Viva la Difference (2009)

Do Not Bend is the third solo album by the English pop musician and songwriter Eric Stewart, a founding member of 10cc.

== Overview ==
The album was recorded over five years at Stewart's Templar Studios in France, with final sessions for the female backing vocals done at David Gilmour's Astoria Studios in London. Stewart plays all the instruments himself although he is assisted with the backing vocals.

Eriс Stewart has said the album's title was inspired by a label posted on a package being mailed by his son Jody. Stewart also wrote a song using the same title that was released on his next solo album Viva la Difference.

== Release ==
The album was released through Stewart's own label Strawberry Soundtracks. The first pressing of the album was released on HDCD. A limited edition was also available with the second disc featuring various demos of 10cc songs. The first one was a recreation of the original demo arrangement version for the song "I'm Not in Love" which was made by Stewart after discovering that the original demo for the song no longer existed. The other demos included "The Stars Didn't Show", originally from the album ...Meanwhile with Kevin Godley on lead vocals, "Tek Dis A Woman", a demo for the song "Take This Woman" from Mirror, Mirror for which Stewart was unhappy, and "A Code of Silence", also from Mirror, Mirror.

== Track listing ==
All songs composed by Eric Stewart except where noted

1. "You Can't Take It With You" – 4:04
2. "A Friend in Need" – 5:08
3. "The Gods Are Smiling" – 4:30
4. "Fred and Dis-Audrey" – 4:13
5. "I Will Love You Tomorrow" – 5:04
6. "Sleeping With the Ghosts" – 5:12
7. "Rappin' with Yves" – 3:21
8. "Norman Conquest II" – 4:18
9. "No No Nettie" – 3:13
10. "Mr Decadent" – 3:50
11. "Do the Books" – 5:37
12. "Set in Blancmange" – 5:55
13. "A Human, Being" – 4:18
14. "You Are Not Me" – 4:37

=== Bonus Disc ===
1. "I'm Not In Love" (Latino) (Stewart, Graham Gouldman)
2. "The Stars Didn't Show" (Stewart, Gouldman)
3. "Tek Dis A Woman"
4. "A Code of Silence"
5. "Shine"

== Personnel ==
- Eric Stewart – lead vocals, all instruments
- Sam Brown – backing vocals
- Helen McRobbie – backing vocals
- Louise Marshall – backing vocals
