= Facades (album) =

Studio album by Sad Café
- Released: September 1979
- Studios: Strawberry Studios South, Dorking; The Village, West Los Angeles
- Genre: Pop rock
- Length: 41:13 (European version); 41:31 (US version)
- Labels: RCA; A&M
- Producers: Eric Stewart; Sad Café

Sad Café chronology
Misplaced Ideals (1978)	Facades (1979)	Sad Café (1980)

Singles from Facades
- 1. "Every Day Hurts" Released: August 1979; 2. "Emptiness" Released: September 1979 (US); 3. "Strange Little Girl" Released: January 1980; 4. "My Oh My" Released: March 1980; 5. "Nothing Left Toulouse" Released: May 1980

Professional ratings
Review scores
Source	Rating
AllMusic	4/5 stars
Encyclopedia of Popular Music	2/5 stars

Facades is the third studio album by English rock band Sad Café, released in September 1979 by RCA Records.

== Recording ==
All of the songs were produced and engineered by Eric Stewart and recorded at Strawberry Studios South in Dorking, except for "Emptiness", which was produced by Sad Café, engineered by Mark Smith and recorded at The Village in West Los Angeles.

== Release and reception ==
This was the first studio album by Sad Café to be released in North America. However, it had a slightly different track listing. The US version has a shorter edit of "Nothing Left Toulouse", which was retitled "Nothing Left to Lose". "Cottage Love" was also replaced with "Time is So Hard to Find" (the B-side to the "Strange Little Girl" single). "Every Day Hurts" was also retitled to "Everyday", but is exactly the same song. This version was also released in Canada; however, "Every Day Hurts" was not retitled. The album wasn't as successful in the US and only charted at number 146 on the Billboard 200.

Several singles were released from the album, with "Every Day Hurts" and "My Oh My" the most successful, reaching number 3 and 14 respectively on the UK Singles Chart. The album itself reached number 8 on the UK Albums Chart in April 1980 and was certified gold by the BPI in June.

The US version was reissued as a double CD set in 1998 by Renaissance Records, with the US version of Misplaced Ideals. In the UK, the album was reissued, also as a double CD set, in 2009 by Edsel Records, with the band's fourth album Sad Café.

== Track listing ==
European version
No.	Title	Writer(s)	Length
1.	"Take Me to the Future"	Ian Wilson, Paul Young, John Stimpson	4:03
2.	"Nothing Left Toulouse"	Young, Stimpson	4:53
3.	"Every Day Hurts"	Young, Stimpson, Vic Emerson	4:05
4.	"Strange Little Girl"	Ashley Mulford	5:00
5.	"Crazy Oyster"	Young	4:27
6.	"Emptiness"	Young, Mulford, Wilson	3:11
7.	"Cottage Love"	Sad Café	3:15
8.	"Angel"	Wilson	3:45
9.	"Get Me Outta Here"	Young, Wilson	3:52
10.	"My Oh My"	Young, Emerson	4:42
Total length:			41:13

US version
No.	Title	Writer(s)	Length
1.	"Take Me to the Future"		4:04
2.	"Nothing Left to Lose"		4:32
3.	"Everyday"		4:05
4.	"Strange Little Girl"		5:03
5.	"Crazy Oyster"		4:28
6.	"Emptiness"		3:31
7.	"Time is So Hard to Find"	Sad Café	3:30
8.	"Angel"		3:43
9.	"Get Me Outta' Here"		3:53
10.	"My Oh My"		4:42
Total length:			41:31

== Personnel ==
- Paul Young – lead vocals, percussion
- Ian Wilson – guitar, backing vocals
- Ashley Mulford – lead guitar, backing vocals
- Vic Emerson – keyboards
- John Stimpson – bass guitar, backing vocals
- Dave Irving – Drums
- Lenni Zaksen – saxophone on "Emptiness"
