= My Oh My (Sad Café song) =

Single by Sad Café

from the album Facades
- B-side: "Cottage Love"
- Released: 1980
- Recorded: 1979
- Genre: Soft rock
- Label: RCA
- Songwriter(s): Paul Young, Vic Emerson
- Producer(s): Eric Stewart

"My Oh My" is a song by British band Sad Café, from their third album Facades (1979). It was released as a single in 1980 and was a top 20 hit, reaching No. 14 on the UK Singles Chart, and spending a total of 11 weeks on the chart.

== Track listing ==
UK 7" single
A. "My Oh My"
B. "Cottage Love"

== Charts ==
Chart (1980)	Peak position
Netherlands (Single Top 100)	42
UK Singles (Official Charts Company)	14
