= Frooty Rooties =

Studio album by Eric Stewart
- Released: August 1982
- Recorded: 1979–1982
- Studios: Strawberry Studio South, Strawberry Studio North
- Genre: Rock
- Length: 40:57
- Labels: Phonogram, Mercury
- Producer: Eric Stewart

Eric Stewart chronology
Girls (1980)	Frooty Rooties (1982)	Do Not Bend (2003)

Professional ratings
Review scores
Source	Rating
AllMusic	2.5/5 stars

Frooty Rooties is the second solo album of Eric Stewart released in 1982.

== Overview ==
The album opens with a ten-minute three part composition "The Ritual" reminiscent of the 10cc songs "Une Nuit a Paris" and "Feel the Benefit". The vocal effects on "The Ritual" were created by the first AMS delay line, a repeat echo unit that revolutionised "Double Track" Vocals in the 1970s and the chorusing/flanging was achieved by modulating the effect of the repeated vocal ever so slightly so that it moves around the stereo. The ballad "Make the Pieces Fit" was originally written for 10cc album Look Hear? and was also featured on Stewart's previous album, "Girls". "Doris the Florist" is another ballad in the classic 10cc style. The rest of the album is Eric Stewart's homage to the classic rock'n'roll of the 60's thus the album's name.

Frooty Rooties was recorded mostly by Eric Stewart and Paul Burgess and features several additional contributions from then 10cc lineup musicians.

The cover of the album is a pin-up painting by Gil Elvgren.

There were no singles released from the album and it failed to chart in the U.K.

== Track listing ==
All tracks written by Eric Stewart

1. "The Ritual" - 10:42
  - Part one: Progress de la Rake
  - Part two: Euphoria
  - Part three: The Rake's Progress / A Dog with Four Trees
2. "Make the Pieces Fit" - 4:20
3. "Never Say I Told You So" - 4:22
4. "Night and Day" - 2:32
5. "All My Loving Following You" - 3:49
6. "Rockin My Troubles Away" - 3:04
7. "Doris the Florist (The Bouquet That Nobody Caught)" - 4:13
8. "Guitaaaaaaaaaaaargh's (Rooties)" - 4:10
9. "Strictly Business" - 4:28

== Personnel ==
- Eric Stewart - lead vocals, backing vocals, guitars, bass, vocoder choirs, organ, piano, percussion, Rhodes, Moog bass, bass drum, shaker, vocoder strings, grand piano, harmonium
- Paul Burgess - drums, congas, percussion
- Rick Fenn - lead guitar on "Make the Pieces Fit"
- Graham Gouldman - acoustic guitar and autoharp "Make the Pieces Fit"
- Vic Emerson - grand piano on "Night and Day" and "Strictly Business"
- Lenni Crooks - saxophone solo on "Night and Day" and "All My Loving Following You", brass on "Rockin My Troubles Away"
