= Every Day Hurts =

Single by Sad Café

from the album Facades
- B-side: "Wish This Night Would Never End"
- Released: 1979
- Genre: Soft rock
- Label: RCA
- Songwriters: John Stimpson, Paul Young, Vic Emerson
- Producer: Eric Stewart

"Every Day Hurts" is a song by British band Sad Café, from their third album Facades. It was released as a single in 1979 and became their biggest hit, reaching No. 3 on the UK Singles Chart, with a total of 12 weeks on the chart.

"Every Day Hurts" was among the top 20 best-selling singles in Britain in 1979.

== Track listing ==
UK 7" single
A. "Every Day Hurts"
B. "Wish This Night Would Never End"

== Charts ==
Chart (1979/80)	Peak position
Australia (Kent Music Report)	78
Netherlands (Single Top 100)	48
UK Singles (Official Charts Company)	3
