= I'm Alive (The Hollies song) =

Single by the Hollies
- B-side: "You Know He Did"
- Released: 21 May 1965
- Recorded: 5 May 1965
- Studio: EMI, London
- Genre: Pop rock
- Length: 2:21
- Label: Parlophone (UK); Imperial (US)
- Songwriter: Clint Ballard, Jr.
- Producer: Ron Richards

The Hollies singles chronology
"Yes I Will" (1965)	"I'm Alive" (1965)	"Look Through Any Window" (1965)

"I'm Alive" is a 1965 number-one UK hit single by the Hollies, written for them by American songwriter Clint Ballard Jr. Although they originally passed the song over to another Manchester band, the Toggery Five, they changed their minds and recorded it, achieving their first No. 1 hit in the UK Singles Chart. It spent three weeks at number one in the UK and was also a No. 1 hit in Ireland. The song was released as a single in the US, entering the Cash Box singles chart on July 17, 1965, and peaking at No. 84 week of August 14, 1965, and it also appears on the US version of the 1965 Hollies album, Hear! Here!.

Cash Box described it as "a low-key, rhythmic romancer about a lad who's on cloud [nine] since he met the girl of his dreams."

== Charts ==
Chart (1965)	Peak position
Finland (Soumen Virallinen)	37
Ireland (IRMA)	1
Netherlands (Single Top 100)	10
New Zealand (Laver Hit Parade)	3
Norway (VG-lista)	6
South Africa (Springbok)	3
UK Singles (Official Charts)	1
West Germany (GfK)	16

== Cover Versions ==
- The song was covered by Gamma in 1979 on their debut album, Gamma 1, whose version peaked at #60 on the Hot 100.
- In 1983 the Hi-NRG group American Fade also covered the song which is listed on HotDiscoMix's Hi-NRG Top 200 — Hits of the 80's.
