= Wayne Fontana =

English pop singer (1945–2020)

Background information
- Born: Glyn Geoffrey Ellis; 28 October 1945; Manchester, England
- Died: 6 August 2020 (aged 74) Stockport, England
- Genres: Beat; pop
- Occupation: Singer
- Years active: 1962–2020
- Labels: Fontana; Metromedia
- Formerly of: The Mindbenders

Glyn Geoffrey Ellis (28 October 1945 – 6 August 2020), known professionally as Wayne Fontana, was an English rock and pop singer best known for fronting the beat group the Mindbenders, with whom he recorded the hit singles "Um, Um, Um, Um, Um, Um" (1964) and "The Game of Love" (1965). After leaving the Mindbenders to pursue a solo career, Fontana had further UK successes, including "Pamela Pamela" (1966). Despite legal issues in the 2000s, he continued to perform on the 60s nostalgia circuit until his death.

== Biography ==
=== Music career ===
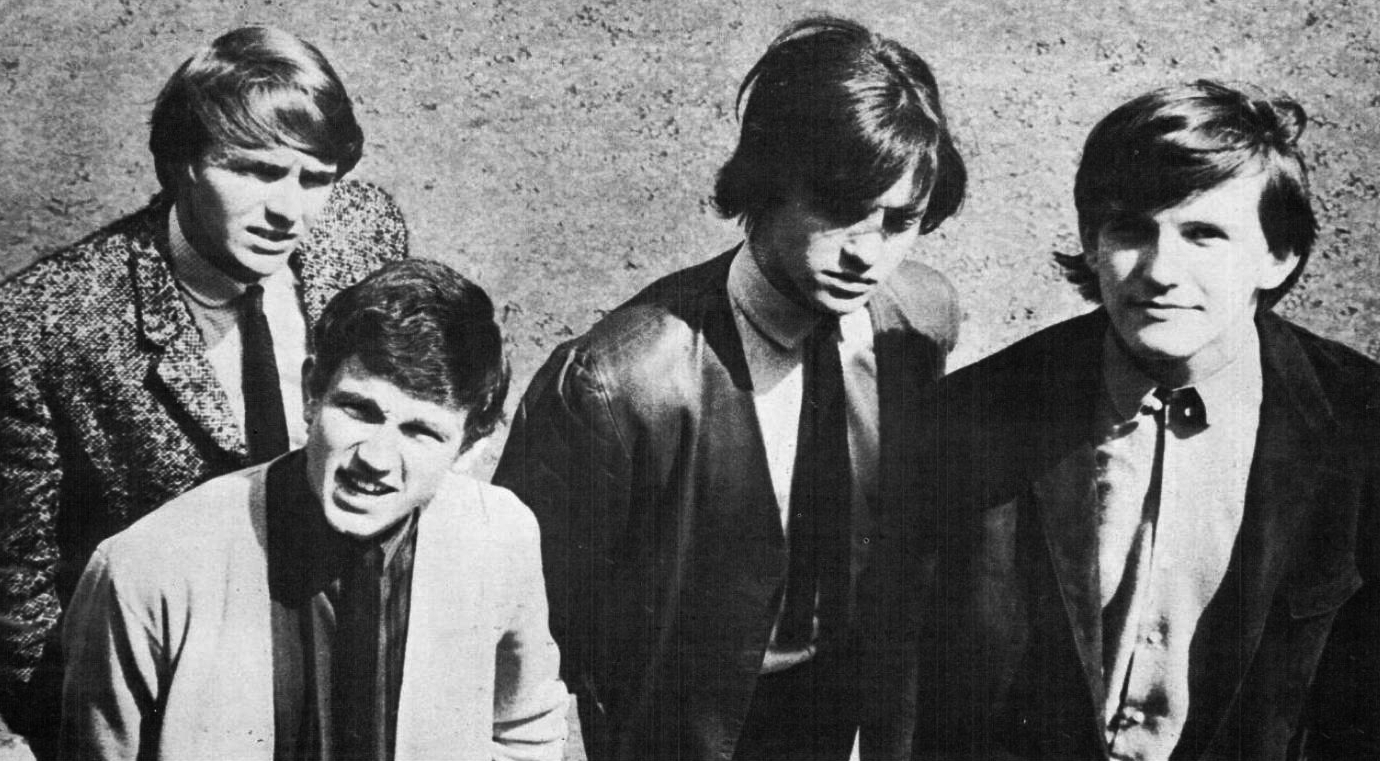
Wayne Fontana & the Mindbenders in 1965. From left to right: Bob Lang, Ric Rothwell, Eric Stewart and Wayne Fontana.

Fontana was born in Levenshulme, Manchester, Lancashire, and took his stage name from John Wayne and Elvis Presley's drummer, D. J. Fontana. In June 1963 he formed his backing group, the Mindbenders, and secured a recording contract with, coincidentally, Fontana Records. With the band, Fontana released his biggest single "The Game of Love" and after several less successful singles, including "It's Just a Little Bit Too Late" and "She Needs Love" he left the band in October 1965. He reportedly quit during a concert performance.

Fontana remained under contract to the label after parting with the Mindbenders and continued alone, using musicians working under the name of the Opposition, notably Frank Renshaw (lead guitar) (born 22 June 1943, Wythenshawe, Manchester), Bernie Burns (drums), Stuart Sirret (bass), and Phil Keen (drums), among others. Sometimes the band was billed as the Mindbenders, sometimes just as the Wayne Fontana Band. Struggling to achieve chart success, Fontana recorded a number of songs by outside writers, with B-sides being mostly his own compositions. Fontana's biggest solo single, "Pamela, Pamela", written by Graham Gouldman, reached No. 5 in Australia's Kent Music Report and No. 11 on the UK Singles Chart in early 1967. It was his last single to chart in the UK. The later singles included another Gouldman composition, "The Impossible Years". After a streak of flopped releases, Fontana took a break in 1970.

In 1973, trying to re-launch his career, Fontana recorded yet another Gouldman song, "Together". It was backed with an original song, "One-Man Woman", that was co-produced with Eric Stewart, an ex-bandmate from the Mindbenders. The single failed to chart. After his last single, "The Last Bus Home", released by Polydor in 1976, he largely left the music business. For a short period around the early 1980s, the Salford Jets backed him, billed as Wayne Fontana and the Mindbenders. He told the Daily Express in 2017, "I went into self-retirement, drank too much and didn't know where I was half the time." After giving up drinking, he joined the 60s revival circuit.

=== Later years ===
In 2005, he fought off bankruptcy but was arrested after police were called by bailiffs who went to his home in Glossop, Derbyshire. He poured petrol onto the bonnet of a bailiff's car and set it alight with the bailiff still inside. Fontana was remanded in custody on 25 May 2007. He later appeared at Derby Crown Court dressed as Lady Justice, complete with a sword, scales, crown, cape and dark glasses, and claiming "justice is blind". He dismissed his lawyers. On 10 November 2007 he was sentenced to 11 months for setting fire to the car but was released because he had already served the equivalent of the term, having been held under the Mental Health Act 1983.

In March 2011, Fontana was arrested at the Palace Theatre, Manchester, after failing to appear in court in Wakefield, over an unpaid speeding fine.

Fontana continued to perform, notably in the Solid Silver 60s Shows.

Fontana died from cancer on 6 August 2020, at Stepping Hill Hospital, Stockport, at the age of 74. His long-term partner was by his side. He had a daughter and two sons.

== Discography ==
=== Studio albums ===
Wayne Fontana and the Mindbenders

- Wayne Fontana and the Mindbenders – December 1964 (UK Fontana TL5230) No. 18 UK.
- The Game of Love – April 1965 (US Fontana MGF 27542 (Mono)/SRF 67542 (Stereo))
- Eric, Rick, Wayne and Bob – It's Wayne Fontana and the Mindbenders – February 1965 (UK Fontana TL5257) label has: Um, Um, Um, Um, Um, Um – It's Wayne Fontana and the Mindbenders) )

Wayne Fontana

- Wayne One – July 1966 (UK Fontana TL5351 (Mono)/STL5351 (Stereo))
- Wayne Fontana – June 1967 (US MGM E 4459 (Mono)/SE 4459 (Stereo))

=== Compilation albums ===
- Hit Single Anthology – 1991 (Europe Fontana 848 161-2)
- The Best of Wayne Fontana & The Mindbenders – 1994 (US Fontana 314 522 666-2)

=== Singles ===
==== Wayne Fontana and the Mindbenders ====
Year	Single	Catalogue	Chart Positions					UK album	US album
Year	Single	Catalogue	UK	AUS	CAN	IRL	US	UK album	US album
1963	"Hello Josephine" b/w "Road Runner"	UK Fontana TF404	46	—	—	—	—	Non-album tracks	Non-album tracks
1963	"For You, for You" b/w "Love Potion No. 9"	UK Fontana TF418	—	—	—	—	—	Non-album tracks	Non-album tracks
1964	"Little Darlin'" b/w "Come Dance with Me"	UK Fontana TF436	—	—	—	—	—	Non-album tracks	Non-album tracks
1964	"Stop Look and Listen"; UK B: "Duke of Earl"; US B: "Road Runner"	UK Fontana TF451; US Fontana 1917	37	—	—	—	—	Non-album tracks	Non-album tracks
1964	"Um, Um, Um, Um, Um, Um" b/w "First Taste of Love"	UK Fontana TF497	5	—	—	—	—	Non-album tracks	Non-album tracks
1965	"The Game of Love" b/w "Since You've Been Gone" b/w "One More Time" (Second US pressing)	UK Fontana TF535; US Fontana 1503; US Fontana 1509 (Second US pressing)	2	38	3	10	1	A: Non-album track B1: Non-album track B2: Wayne Fontana and the Mindbenders	A: The Game of Love; B1: Non-album track B2: The Game of Love
1965	"It's Just a Little Bit Too Late" b/w "Long Time Comin'"	UK Fontana TF579; US Fontana 1514	20	55	9	—	46	Eric, Rick, Wayne and Bob	Non-album tracks
1965	"She Needs Love" b/w "Like I Did"	UK Fontana TF611; US Fontana 1524	32	—	—	—	—	A: Non-album track B: Eric, Rick, Wayne and Bob	Non-album tracks
"—" denotes releases that did not chart or were not released in that territory.

==== Wayne Fontana (solo) ====
Year	Single	Catalogue	Chart Positions				UK album	US album
Year	Single	Catalogue	UK	AUS	IRL	BR	UK album	US album
1965	"It Was Easier To Hurt Her" b/w "You Made Me What I Am Today"	UK Fontana TF642; US MGM 13456	36	—	—	—	Wayne One	Wayne Fontana
1966	"Come on Home" b/w "My Eyes Break Out in Tears"	UK Fontana TF684; US MGM 13516	16	38	—	—	Wayne One	A: Non-album track B: Wayne Fontana
1966	"Goodbye Bluebird" b/w "The Sun's So Hot Today"	UK Fontana TF737	49	—	—	—	Non-album tracks	Non-album tracks
1966	"Pamela Pamela" b/w "Something Keeps Calling Me Back"	UK Fontana TF770; AU Fontana TF770; US MGM 13661	11	5	20	—	Non-album tracks	Wayne Fontana
1967	"24 Sycamore" b/w "From a Boy To a Man"	UK Fontana TF827; US MGM 13762	52 (Note: Chart position is from the official UK "Breakers List".)	33	—	—	Non-album tracks	Non-album tracks
1967	"The Impossible Years" b/w "In My World"	UK Fontana TF866	—	72	—	—	Non-album tracks	Non-album tracks
1967	"Gina" b/w "We All Love the Human Race"	UK Fontana TF889	—	—	—	1	Non-album tracks	Non-album tracks
1968	"Storybook Children" b/w "I Need To Love You"	UK Fontana TF911	—	—	—	—	Non-album tracks	Non-album tracks
1968	"The Words of Bartholomew" b/w "Mind Excursion"	UK Fontana TF933	—	84	—	—	Non-album tracks	Non-album tracks
1968	"Never an Everyday Thing" b/w "Waiting For a Break in the Clouds"	UK Fontana TF976	—	—	—	—	Non-album tracks	Non-album tracks
1969	"Dayton Ohio 1903" b/w "Say Goodbye To Yesterday"	UK Fontana TF1008; US Metromedia 133	—	—	—	—	Non-album tracks	Non-album tracks
1969	"We're Building a Love" b/w "Charlie Cass"	UK Fontana TF1054	—	—	—	—	Non-album tracks	Non-album tracks
1969	"Charlie Cass" b/w "Linda"	UK Fontana TF1054	—	—	—	—	Non-album tracks	Non-album tracks
1973	"Together" b/w "One Man Woman"	UK Warner Bros. K 16269	—	—	—	—	Non-album tracks	Non-album tracks
1976	"The Last Bus Home" b/w "Give Me Just a Little Bit"	UK Polydor 2058 758	—	—	—	—	Non-album tracks	Non-album tracks
"—" denotes releases that did not chart or were not released in that territory.
