= Sad Café =

English rock band

- Origin: Manchester, England
- Genre: Soft rock
- Years active: 1976–1990, 1998, 2000, 2012–present
- Labels: RCA; A&M; Swan Song; Polydor; Legacy; Atlantic; Edsel; Ariola Express; Camden; Eagle; Renaissance; Castle Communications; Armoury
- Members: Des Tong; Dave Day; Neil Shaw-Hulme; Matt Steele; Steve Gibson; Matt Wolff
- Past members: Paul Young; Vic Emerson; Ian Wilson; John Stimpson; Tony Cresswell; Lenni; Michael Byron-Hehir; Jeff Seopardi; Phil Lanzon; Alistair Gordon; Simon Waggott; Steve Whalley; Ashley Mulford; Pete Hughes; Dave Irving; Sue Wilson-Quin; Bryan Hargreaves; Barry James Thomas; Paul McCafferty
- Website: www.sadcafe.co.uk

Sad Café are an English rock band formed in Manchester in 1976, who achieved their peak of popularity in the late 1970s and early 1980s. They are best known for the UK top 40 singles "Every Day Hurts", "Strange Little Girl", "My Oh My" and "I'm in Love Again", the first of which was their biggest hit, reaching number 3 on the UK Singles Chart in 1979. The band also had two US Billboard Hot 100 hits with "Run Home Girl" and "La-Di-Da".

== History ==
=== 1976–1990 ===
The group formed as a result of the unification of rock bands Mandalaband and Gyro. Its founder members were Paul Young (vocals), Ian Wilson (guitar), Vic Emerson (keyboards), Ashley Mulford (lead guitar), John Stimpson (bass) and Tony Cresswell (drums). The band took their name from the Carson McCullers novella The Ballad of the Sad Café.

Their debut album, Fanx Ta-Ra, was released in September 1977 under the original lineup. It charted at number 56 on the UK album charts. The following April, their second album, Misplaced Ideals, was released. It peaked at number 50 in the albums charts, and later that year, a compilation album of the same name was released in North America. This was the last album released by the original lineup, as soon after the release, Cresswell left the band and was replaced by Dave Irving.

Harvey Lisberg, who also managed 10cc, arranged for Eric Stewart to produce their third album, Facades (an anagram of Sad Cafe), which included the top 3 single "Every Day Hurts". One of the tracks, "Emptiness", featured Lenni Zaksen on saxophone, who would the join the band as a permanent member soon after.

In 1980, the band released their self-titled fourth studio album, which failed to sell commercially, at which point Stimpson had stepped down from bass and became manager, and was replaced by Des Tong. With Tong, they released their fifth album, Olé, in October 1981. This album also failed to sell commercially, and the band gradually faded out of the spotlight, and after many lineup changes and two unsuccessful albums, the band ended in 1990. A one-off concert occurred in 1998.

=== Paul Young tribute concert (2000) ===
In July 2000, Young died of a heart attack, at the age of fifty-three. In December of that year, a tribute concert was held, which featured Wilson, Emerson, Zaksen from the 1970s lineups, as well as guest appearances from Roger Taylor, Spike Edney, Roy Wood, Fish, The Toggery Five (Young's first professional band), and Stevie Vann, and a performance by Young's band Mike and the Mechanics.

=== 2012–present ===
In November 2012, the band reformed for a tour with a lineup that included Wilson, Irving, Mulford, and Tong, plus Steve Whalley (guitar), Sue Quin (vocals/keys), and Simon Waggott (keys). They released a live album from the tour. Mulford, Whalley, and Waggott all left in 2014.

Vic Emerson died on 13 October 2018. John Stimpson died in 2021.

Irving left in 2019, and Wilson retired in 2022, leaving no original members in the band. The current lineup includes longtime member Des Tong.

Barry James Thomas, who joined as a vocalist in 2018, died in 2024, and was replaced by Matt Wolff.

== Personnel ==
=== Members ===
Current

- Des Tong – bass, vocals (1981–1990, 1998, 2000, 2012–present)
- Steve Gibson - drums (1989–1990, 2023–present)
- Dave Day - guitars, vocals (2018–present)
- Neil Shaw-Hulme - saxophones, wx7, vocals (2018–present)
- Matt Steele - keyboards (2019–present)
- Matt Wolff - vocals (2025-present)

Former

- Ian Wilson - rhythm guitar, vocals (1976–2022)
- Paul Young – lead vocals (1976–1990, 1998; died 2000)
- Vic Emerson – keyboards (1976–1984, 2000; died 2018)
- John Stimpson – bass, backing vocals (1976–1980; died 2021)
- Tony Cresswell – drums (1976–1978)
- Ashley Mulford – lead guitars, vocals (1976–1981, 1986–1989, 2000, 2012–2014)
- Dave Irving - drums (1978–1984, 2000, 2012–2019)
- Lenni Zaksen – saxophone (1979–1984, 1998, 2000)
- Al Hodge - guitars (1981; died 2006)
- Michael Byron-Hehir – lead guitars (1981–1984, 1989–1990, 1998; guest musician: 1986)
- Jeff Seopardi – drums (1984–1986)
- Danny Schogger – keyboards (1984)
- Miffy Smith – keyboards (1986)
- Alistair Gordon – keyboards, vocals (1989–1990, 1998)
- Simon Waggott – keyboards, vocals (2012–2014)
- Steve Whalley – vocals, guitar (2012–2014; died 2025)
- Sue Wilson-Quin - keyboards, vocals (2012–2022)
- Pete Hughes - keyboards (2018)
- Bryan Hargreaves – drums (2019–2022)
- Barry James Thomas - vocals, percussion (2018–2024; died 2024)
- Paul McCafferty - vocals (2025)

Guest musicians

- Roy Martin – drums (1998)
- Paul Burgess – drums (1986–1990)
- Steve Pigott – keyboards (1984–1986)
- Ali Roocroft - keyboards (2023-2024)
- Fraser Rowe - keyboards (2025)

=== Lineups ===
1976–1978	1978–1979	1979–1980	1980–1981
Paul Young – lead vocals; Ashley Mulford – lead guitar, backing vocals; Ian Wilson – rhythm guitar, backing vocals; Vic Emerson – keyboards; John Stimpson – bass, backing vocals; Tony Cresswell – drums	Paul Young – lead vocals; Ashley Mulford – lead guitar, backing vocals; Ian Wilson – rhythm guitar, backing vocals; Vic Emerson – keyboards; John Stimpson – bass, backing vocals; Dave Irving – drums	Paul Young – lead vocals; Ashley Mulford – lead guitar, backing vocals; Ian Wilson – rhythm guitar, backing vocals; Vic Emerson – keyboards; John Stimpson – bass, backing vocals; Dave Irving – drums; Lenni – saxophone	Paul Young – lead vocals; Ashley Mulford – lead guitar, backing vocals; Ian Wilson – rhythm guitar, backing vocals; Vic Emerson – keyboards; Dave Irving – drums; Lenni – saxophone; Des Tong – bass, backing vocals
1981–1984	1986 Politics of Existing	1986	1986–1989
Paul Young – lead vocals; Ian Wilson – rhythm guitar, backing vocals; Vic Emerson – keyboards; Dave Irving – drums; Lenni – saxophone; Des Tong – bass, backing vocals; Michael Byron-Hehir – lead guitar	Paul Young – lead vocals; Ian Wilson – guitars, backing vocals; Des Tong – bass; Jeff Seopardi – drums; Danny Schogger - Keyboards; Nico Ramsden - Guitars; Mike Rutherford - Guitar; Mel Collins - Sax; Martin Ditcham - Percussion; Paul Carrack - Backing Vocals; Andy Caine - Backing Vocals	Paul Young – lead vocals; Ian Wilson – rhythm guitar, backing vocals; Des Tong – bass, backing vocals; Ashley Mulford – lead guitar, backing vocals; Jeff Seopardi – drums; Phil Lanzon – keyboards; Guest musicians: Michael Byron-Hehir – lead guitar	Paul Young – lead vocals; Ian Wilson – rhythm guitar, backing vocals; Des Tong – bass, backing vocals; Ashley Mulford – lead guitar, backing vocals; Paul Burgess – drums
1994 Whatever It Takes	1994 BMI Event	2000 Forever Young	2012–2014
Paul Young – lead vocals; Ian Wilson – rhythm guitar, backing vocals; Des Tong – bass, backing vocals; Paul Burgess – drums; Michael Byron-Hehir – lead guitar; Alistair Gordon – keyboards, backing vocals; Steve Pigott - Keyboards, programming	Paul Young – lead vocals; Ian Wilson – rhythm guitar, backing vocals; Des Tong – bass, backing vocals; Michael Byron-Hehir – lead guitar; Alistair Gordon – keyboards, backing vocals; Lenni – saxophone; Roy Martin – drums	Ian Wilson – rhythm guitar, vocals; Des Tong – bass, vocals; Lenni – saxophone; Vic Emerson – keyboards; Dave Irving – drums; Michael Byron-Hehir – lead guitar; Alistair Gordon- vocals; Steve Butler - vocals; John Hopcroft - vocals; Sue Quin - vocals	Ian Wilson – rhythm guitar, vocals; Des Tong – bass, vocals; Dave Irving – drums; Ashley Mulford – lead guitar, vocals; Sue Quin – vocals, keyboards; Simon Waggott – keyboards, vocals; Steve Whalley – guitar, vocals
2018	2019	2021–2022	2023–2025
Ian Wilson – rhythm guitar, vocals; Des Tong – bass, vocals; Dave Irving – drums; Sue Quin – vocals; Barry James Thomas - vocals; Dave Day - lead guitars, vocals; Neil Shaw-Hulme - saxophone, wx7, vocals; Pete Hughes - keyboards	Ian Wilson – rhythm guitar, vocals; Des Tong – bass, vocals; Dave Irving – drums; Sue Quin – vocals; Barry James Thomas - vocals; Dave Day - lead guitars, vocals; Neil Shaw-Hulme - saxophone, wx7, vocals; Matt Steele - keyboards	Ian Wilson – rhythm guitar, vocals; Des Tong – bass, vocals; Bryan Hargreaves - drums; Sue Quin – vocals; Barry James Thomas - vocals; Dave Day - lead guitars, vocals; Neil Shaw-Hulme - saxophone, wx7, vocals; Matt Steele - keyboards	Des Tong - bass, vocals; Dave Day - lead guitars, vocals; Barry James Thomas - vocals; Neil Shaw-Hulme - saxophone, wx7, vocals; Matt Steele - keyboards; Steve Gibson - drums; SPECIAL GUESTS; Ali Roocroft - keyboards; James Russell - saxophone; Glyn Davies - lead guitar; Fraser Rowe - keyboards

== Discography ==
=== Studio albums ===
Title	Details	Peak chart positions		
Title	Details	UK	CAN	US
Fanx Ta-Ra	Released: September 1977; Label: RCA	56	—	—
Misplaced Ideals	Released: April 1978; Label: RCA	50	—	—
Misplaced Ideals	Released: November 1978; Label: A&M; US version of the two first LPs	—	82	94
Facades	Released: September 1979; Label: RCA, A&M	8	90	146
Sad Café	Released: October 1980; Label: RCA, Swan Song	46	—	160
Olé	Released: October 1981; Label: Polydor	72	—	—
Politics of Existing	Released 21 October 1985; Label: Legacy, Atlantic	—	—	—
Whatever It Takes	Released: 6 February 1989; Label: Legacy	—	—	—

=== Live albums ===
Title	Details	Peak chart positions
Title	Details	UK
Live in Concert	Released: April 1981; Label: RCA	37
Access All Areas	Released: 23 March 2015; Label: Edsel; Includes DVD of concert	—

=== Compilation albums ===
Title	Details
The Best of Sad Café	Released: 1984; Label: RCA
The Best of Sad Café	Released: 1994; Label: Ariola Express
Everyday Hurts: The Best of Sad Café	Released: June 1997; Label: Camden
The Masters	Released: September 1997; Label: Eagle
Facades / Misplaced Ideals	Released: November 1997; Label: Renaissance; US-only release
Saving Grace	Released: September 2000; Label: Castle; Repackaging of Politics of Existing and Whatever It Takes
The Best of Sad Café	Released: April 2001; Label: Camden; Reissue of 1997 Everyday Hurts: The Best of Sad Café
Anthology	Released: July 2001; Label: Burning Airlines; UK release
Every Day Hurts	Released: 2002; Label: Armoury
Anthology	Released: January 2005; Label: Renaissance; US release of the 2001 album
Anthology	Released: September 2008; Label: The Store for Music; European release of the 2001 album
Fanx Ta-Ra / Misplaced Ideals	Released: June 2009; Label: Edsel; UK-only release
Facades / Sad Cafe	Released: June 2009; Label: Edsel; UK-only release
Anthology	Released: January 2021; Label: Renaissance; Vinyl reissue of the 2001 album

=== Singles ===
Title	Year	Chart positions			
Title	Year	UK	AUS	NLD	US
"Black Rose"	1977	—	—	—	—
"Love Will Survive" (UK-only release)	1977	—	—	—	—
"Hungry Eyes" (UK-only release)	1978	—	—	—	—
"Run Home Girl" (US-only release)	1978	—	—	—	71
"Every Day Hurts"	1979	3	78	48	—
"Emptiness" (US and Canada-only release)	1979	—	—	—	108
"Strange Little Girl"	1979	32	—	—	—
"My Oh My"	1980	14	—	42	—
"Nothing Left Toulouse" (UK only-release)	1980	62	—	—	—
"La-Di-Da"	1980	41	—	—	78
"I'm in Love Again"	1980	40	—	—	—
"Black Rose" (Live)	1981	—	—	—	—
"Misunderstanding"	1981	—	—	—	—
"La-Di-Da" (US release)	1981	—	—	—	78
"No Favours – No Way" (US-only promo)	1981	—	—	—	—
"Follow You Anywhere"	1981	—	—	—	—
"Keep Us Together" (UK-only release)	1983	80	—	—	—
"Why Do You Love Me Like You Do"	1984	—	—	—	—
"Refugees" (UK-only release)	1985	—	—	—	—
"Only Love" (UK-only release)	1986	—	—	—	—
"Heart"	1986	—	—	—	—
"Take Me (Heart and Soul)" (UK-only release)	1989	—	—	—	—
"Whatever It Takes"	1989	—	—	—	—

== See also ==
- List of bands from Manchester
- List of bands from England
- List of performers on Top of the Pops
- Swan Song Records
