= Um, Um, Um, Um, Um, Um =

Single by Major Lance

from the album Um, Um, Um, Um, Um, Um
- B-side: "Sweet Music"
- Released: December 1963
- Genre: Soul
- Length: 2:20
- Label: Okeh
- Songwriter: Curtis Mayfield
- Producer: Carl Davis

Major Lance singles chronology
"Hey Little Girl" (1963)	"Um, Um, Um, Um, Um, Um" (1963)	"The Matador" (1964)

"Um, Um, Um, Um, Um, Um" is a song, written by Curtis Mayfield.

== Overview ==
The first recording to be released was by Major Lance, as a single in December 1963, produced by Okeh label president Carl Davis.

Later, the song also made an appearance in the second season of the hospital drama E.R. episode - 'Hell And High Water' where George Clooney's character Dr. Doug Ross played it on his car stereo.

== Chart performance ==
The song was Major Lance's third release to make the Billboard Hot 100 and his most successful hit with a #5 peak on the Billboard Hot 100 on 8 February 1964 with a #1 peak on the Cash Box R&B chart (Billboard did not run an R&B chart November 1963-January 1965). In Canada it reached #6. In the UK it reached #40, Lance's only UK chart appearance.

== Other versions ==
- The song became a major hit in the UK during the autumn of 1964 with a rendition by Wayne Fontana and the Mindbenders reaching No. 5.
- Johnny Rivers covered the song for his 1977 album Outside Help from which it was issued as the follow-up single to the top ten hit "Swayin' to the Music (Slow Dancing)". Rivers' version was renamed "Curious Mind" after a lyric in the second verse; the full title of the Rivers' version being "Curious Mind (Um, Um, Um, Um, Um, Um)". "Curious Mind..." was heavily supported by easy-listening radio, peaking at No. 4 on the Easy Listening chart in Billboard in February 1978; it reached No. 41 on the Billboard Hot 100 where it was Rivers' final charting song.
