= The Mindbenders =

English band (1963–1968)

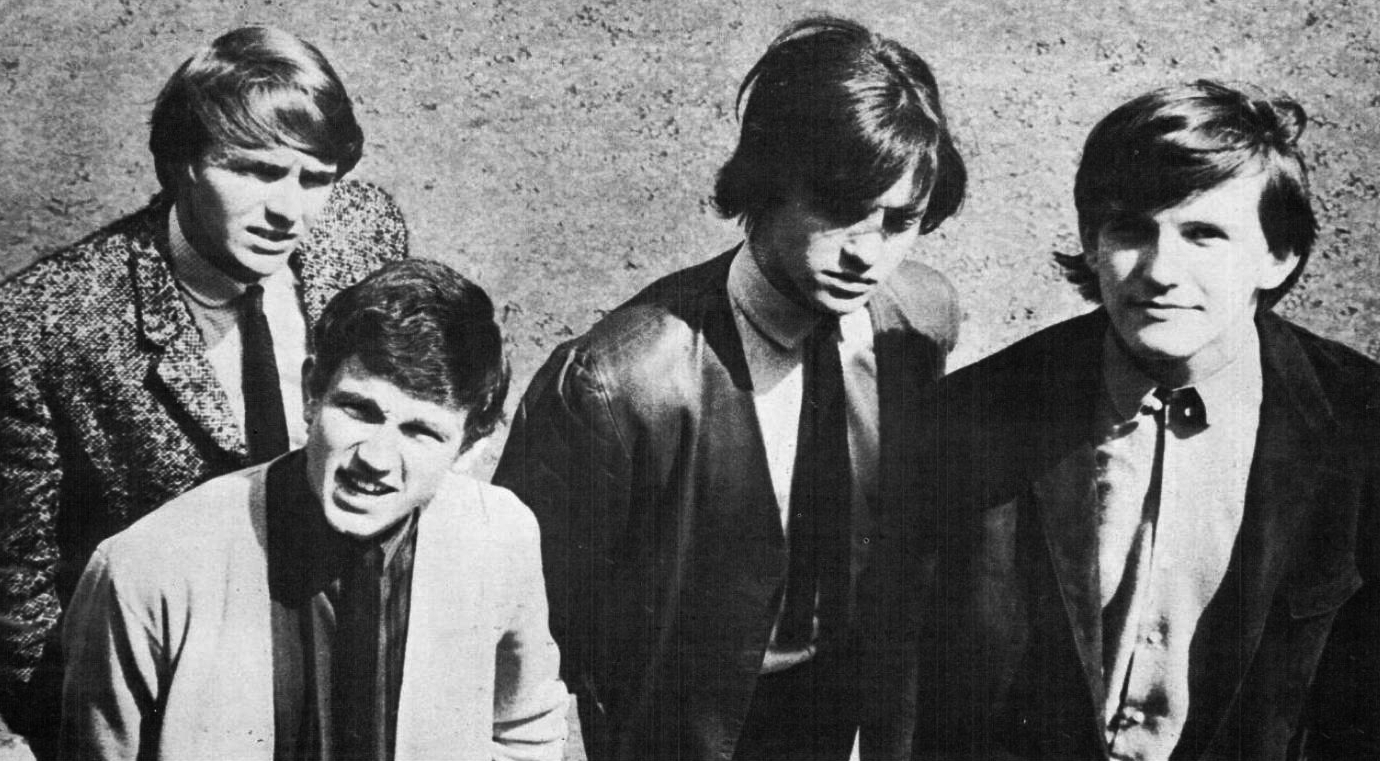
- Wayne Fontana & the Mindbenders in 1965. L-R: Bob Lang, Ric Rothwell, Eric Stewart and Wayne Fontana.

Background information
- Origin: Manchester, England
- Genre: Beat
- Years active: 1963–1968
- Label: Fontana
- Spinoffs: Hotlegs
- Past members: Wayne Fontana; Bob Lang; Ric Rothwell; Eric Stewart; Geoff Foot; Paul Hancox; Graham Gouldman; Jimmy O'Neil

The Mindbenders were an English beat group from Manchester. Originally the backing group for Wayne Fontana, they were one of several acts that were successful in the mid-1960s British Invasion of the US charts, achieving major chart hits with "The Game of Love" (a number-one single with Fontana) in 1965 and "A Groovy Kind of Love" in 1966.

== Career ==
Wayne Fontana founded the band in June 1963 with Bob Lang, Ric Rothwell, and Eric Stewart. The name of the group was inspired by the title of a 1963 UK feature film, starring the British actor Dirk Bogarde, called The Mind Benders. Before that Fontana had a group called Wayne Fontana and the Jets (from July 1962). Wayne Fontana & the Mindbenders released a number of singles before recording "Um, Um, Um, Um, Um, Um" in 1964, which was to be their first major hit in Britain and led to a tour with Brenda Lee. They also had a No. 1 hit in the United States with "The Game of Love" in 1965 (which also reached No. 2 on the UK singles chart). The band's self-titled album reached No. 18 in the UK.

After a tour of America and two more singles that were less successful than "The Game of Love", "It's Just a Little Bit Too Late" and "She Needs Love", Fontana left the band in the middle of a concert in 1965. The Mindbenders decided to carry on as a trio—Stewart was the primary lead singer and guitarist, Lang played bass, and Rothwell was the drummer. Both Lang and Rothwell sang backing vocals, and took the occasional lead vocal on album tracks.

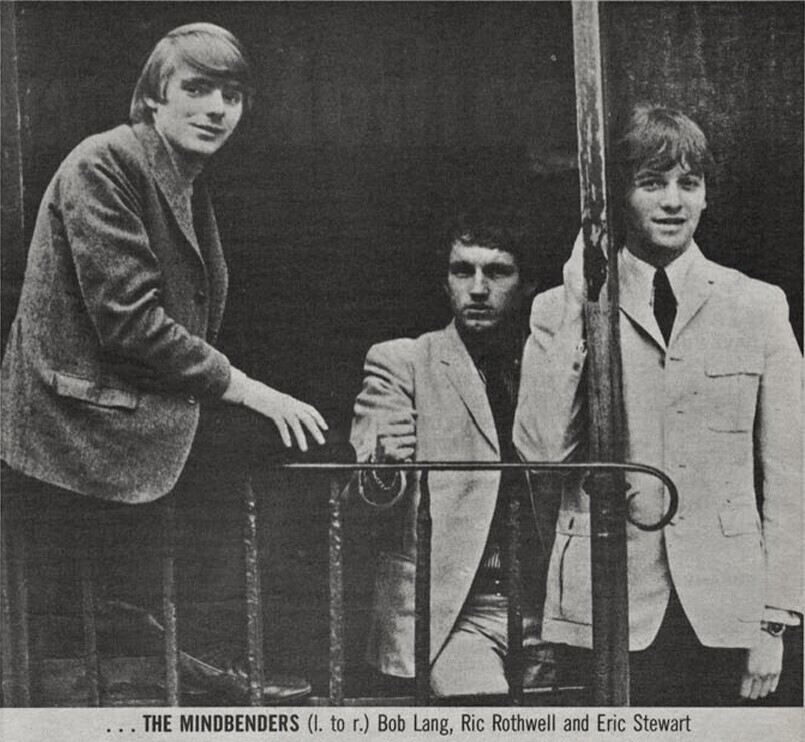
The Mindbenders after Fontana's departure, featured in the 14 May 1966 issue of KRLA Beat

The Mindbenders' first single without Fontana was the hit "A Groovy Kind of Love" (a Carole Bayer Sager / Toni Wine composition). The song reached No. 1 in the US (No. 1 on the Cashbox singles chart) and No. 2 in the UK in 1966. It sold one million copies globally. The Mindbenders' 1966 album of the same name managed to reach No. 28 in the UK.

A second song by Bayer and Wine, "Can't Live with You (Can't Live Without You)", had struggled to break the UK top 30 while the third one, "Ashes to Ashes", took the Mindbenders to No. 14 on the UK Singles Chart in the autumn of 1966.

On 4 July 1966, the Mindbenders began their United States tour in Atlanta, Georgia, in front of a capacity 25,000 crowd as the support act for James Brown. It would be their only tour of the United States as the Mindbenders, without Fontana. Stewart recalled that "we went down quite well", but that later shows at the Fillmore West Auditorium on Friday 8 July and Saturday 9 July 1966 were more memorable. "The liquid light show was great and really worked with our act, which was a lot heavier than on our records."

In September/October 1966, they embarked on a 12-date package tour of England backing Dave Berry of "The Crying Game" fame. The tour also included Dusty Springfield and the Alan Price Set.

Stewart was developing himself as a songwriter, and wrote "My New Day and Age" for Family. However, the Mindbenders generally sought material from outside the band, with only a handful of B-sides and album tracks being written by Stewart, occasionally in collaboration with Lang and Rothwell.

The band's next project was a loose sort of concept album. However, the Mindbenders' release With Woman in Mind really had no overarching narrative or story, the 'concept' being simply songs written about relationships with women. The album contained "I Want Her, She Wants Me" (written by Rod Argent of the Zombies), "Ashes to Ashes", and the lascivious "Schoolgirl" (written by Graham Gouldman). The album did not sell well and was not even released in the United States. The accompanying single, "We'll Talk About It Tomorrow" (another Bayer/Wine composition), also flopped.

The Mindbenders appeared in the 1967 Sidney Poitier film, To Sir, with Love and were also on the soundtrack with the songs "Off and Running" (the last Bayer/Wine song recorded by the band) and "It's Getting Harder All the Time". Shortly thereafter, Rothwell quit the band and was replaced by Paul Hancox. Graham Gouldman became the band's producer around this time; future Led Zeppelin bassist John Paul Jones was also involved in arranging their records in 1967/68.

Later in 1967, the Mindbenders released their cover version of "The Letter" which fell short at No. 42 on the UK singles chart (the last time the Mindbenders registered a single on the UK charts), whilst the Box Tops original reached the UK top 10. A couple more flops followed and in March 1968, Lang quit and was replaced by Graham Gouldman. With Gouldman on bass, but with Ric Dixon producing, the band recorded Gouldman's composition "Uncle Joe, the Ice Cream Man" as their final single.

On 20 November 1968, the Mindbenders broke up at the final concert of a UK tour with the Who, Arthur Brown and Joe Cocker.

=== Aftermath ===
Stewart and Gouldman played together in Hotlegs and later went on to form 10cc.

Lang later joined another rock music outfit, Racing Cars. Lang did not play with the band for long, however, and did not feature on any of their recordings. They had one hit single, "They Shoot Horses, Don't They?", which reached No. 14 on the UK Singles Chart in 1977.

== Personnel ==
- Wayne Fontana (born Glyn Geoffrey Ellis, 28 October 1945, Levenshulme, Manchester Lancashire, died 6 August 2020) – vocals, tambourine (1963–1965)
- Bob Lang (born Robert Francis Lang, 10 January 1946, Levenshulme, Manchester, Lancashire) – bass (1963–1968)
- Ric Rothwell (born Eric Rothwell, 11 March 1944, Reddish, Stockport, Cheshire) – drums (1963–1967)
- Eric Stewart (born Eric Michael Stewart, 20 January 1945, Droylsden, Lancashire) – guitar, vocals (1963–1968)
- Paul Hancox (born 25 October 1950, Birmingham, Warwickshire) – drums (1967–1968)
- Graham Gouldman (born Graham Keith Gouldman, 10 May 1946, Broughton, Salford, Lancashire) – bass (1968)
- Jimmy O'Neil (born James Andrew O'Neil, 6 July 1945, Birmingham, Warwickshire, died January 2016, Philippines) – organ (1968)
- Ted Lee (born Edward James Lee, 26 December 1940, Openshaw, Manchester) – bass

== Discography ==
=== Studio albums ===
Wayne Fontana and the Mindbenders

- Wayne Fontana and the Mindbenders (label has: Um, Um, Um, Um, Um, Um – It's Wayne Fontana and the Mindbenders) – 1964 (UK Fontana TL5230)
- The Game of Love – 1965 (US Fontana MGF 27542 (Mono)/SRF 67542 (Stereo))
- Eric, Rick, Wayne and Bob – It's Wayne Fontana and the Mindbenders – 1965 (UK Fontana TL5257)

The Mindbenders

- The Mindbenders (UK Fontana STL 5324) – June 1966
- A Groovy Kind of Love (US Fontana MGF 27554 (Mono) / SRF 67554 (Stereo)) – US No. 92, July 1966

Original copies feature "Don't Cry No More", replaced with "Ashes to Ashes" on later pressings

- With Woman in Mind (UK Fontana STL 5403) – April 1967

=== Compilation albums ===
- Hit Single Anthology (Europe Fontana 848 161–2) – 1991
- The Best of Wayne Fontana & The Mindbenders (US Fontana 314 522 666–2) – 1994

=== Appearances ===
- To Sir, with Love: Original Motion Picture Soundtrack (US Fontana SRF-67569 / UK Fontana STL-5446) - 1967

=== Singles ===
Wayne Fontana and the Mindbenders

Year	Single	Catalogue	Chart Positions					UK album	US album
Year	Single	Catalogue	UK	AU	CAN	IRL	US	UK album	US album
1963	"Hello Josephine" b/w "Road Runner"	UK Fontana TF404	46	—	—	—	—	Non-album tracks	Non-album tracks
1963	"For You, for You" b/w "Love Potion No. 9"	UK Fontana TF418	—	—	—	—	—	Non-album tracks	Non-album tracks
1964	"Little Darlin'" b/w "Come Dance with Me"	UK Fontana TF436	—	—	—	—	—	Non-album tracks	Non-album tracks
1964	"Stop Look and Listen"; UK B: "Duke of Earl"; US B: "Road Runner"	UK Fontana TF451; US Fontana 1917	37	—	—	—	—	Non-album tracks	Non-album tracks
1964	"Um, Um, Um, Um, Um, Um" b/w "First Taste of Love"	UK Fontana TF497	5	—	—	—	—	Non-album tracks	Non-album tracks
1965	"The Game of Love" b/w "Since You've Been Gone" b/w "One More Time" (Second US pressing)	UK Fontana TF535; US Fontana 1503; US Fontana 1509 (Second US pressing)	2	38	3	10	1	A: Non-album track B1: Non-album track B2: Wayne Fontana and the Mindbenders	A: The Game of Love; B1: Non-album track B2: The Game of Love
1965	"It's Just a Little Bit Too Late" b/w "Long Time Comin'"	UK Fontana TF579; US Fontana 1514	20	55	9	—	45	Eric, Rick, Wayne and Bob	Non-album tracks
1965	"She Needs Love" b/w "Like I Did"	UK Fontana TF611; US Fontana 1524	32	—	—	—	—	A: Non-album track B: Eric, Rick, Wayne and Bob	Non-album tracks

The Mindbenders

Year	Single	Catalogue	Chart Positions					UK album	US album
Year	Single	Catalogue	UK	AU	CAN	IRL	US	UK album	US album
1965	"A Groovy Kind of Love" b/w "Love Is Good"	UK Fontana TF 644; US Fontana 1541	2	—	4	9	2	The Mindbenders	A Groovy Kind of Love
1966	"Can't Live with You (Can't Live Without You)" b/w "One Fine Day"	UK Fontana TF 697	28	—	—	—	—	A: Non-album track B: The Mindbenders	A Groovy Kind of Love
1966	"Ashes to Ashes" b/w "You Don't Know About Love"	UK Fontana TF 731; US Fontana 1555	14	—	18	—	55	A: With Woman in Mind; B: The Mindbenders	Non-album tracks
1966	"I Want Her, She Wants Me" b/w "The Morning After"	UK Fontana TF 780; US Fontana 1571	—	—	—	—	—	With Woman in Mind	Non-album tracks
1967	"We'll Talk About It Tomorrow" b/w "Far Across Town"	UK Fontana TF 806	—	—	—	—	—	Non-album tracks	Non-album tracks
1967	"Off and Running" b/w "It's Getting Harder All the Time"	US Fontana 1595	—	—	—	—	—	To Sir, with Love: Original Motion Picture Soundtrack	
1967	"The Letter" b/w "My New Day and Age"	UK Fontana TF 869	42	—	—	—	—	Non-album tracks	Non-album tracks
1967	"Schoolgirl"^{[A]} b/w "Coming Back"	UK Fontana TF 877	—	—	—	—	—	A: With Woman in Mind; B: Non-album track	Non-album tracks
1968	"Blessed Are the Lonely" b/w "Yellow Brick Road"	UK Fontana TF 910; US Fontana 1620	—	—	—	—	—	Non-album tracks	Non-album tracks
1968	"Uncle Joe, the Ice Cream Man" b/w "The Man Who Loved Trees"	UK Fontana TF 961; US Fontana 1628	—	—	—	—	—	Non-album tracks	Non-album tracks
1969	"A Groovy Kind of Love" b/w "Ashes to Ashes"	UK Fontana TF 1026	—	—	—	—	—	A: The Mindbenders; B: With Woman in Mind	A Groovy Kind of Love; B: Non-album track

== See also ==
- List of music artists and bands from Manchester
- List of artists who reached number one in the United States
- List of performers on Top of the Pops

== Notes ==
- A Re-recorded version.
