= Vic Emerson =

English musician (1949-2018)

- Born: 1949; Prestwich, Bury, England
- Died: 13 October 2018 (aged 69) Paris, France
- Genres: Rock; soft rock
- Occupations: Musician; songwriter; pianist; keyboardist
- Instruments: Hammond organ; keyboards; synthesizer; piano
- Label: RCA
- Formerly of: Mandalaband; Sad Café; 10cc

Victor Emerson (1949 – 13 October 2018) was an English musician, songwriter and keyboardist. He was a founder member of the bands Mandalaband and Sad Café. He was co-writer of the latter's 1979 No. 3 UK hit single "Every Day Hurts" and the 1980 No. 14 hit "My Oh My". He was also a member of the rock band 10cc from 1981 to 1983.

== Early life and career ==
Emerson was born in Prestwich, which at the time was in Lancashire but is now in the Metropolitan Borough of Bury, in Greater Manchester. He was the son of tailor Ben Emerson, and wife Myra. At age four, he had his first piano lessons and attended the Bury Grammar School. In the early 1960s, he bought a Hammond organ for use at home, then became a cinema organist in Stockport after he left school.

In the 1960s, Emerson worked on the cabaret circuit, playing keyboards, then became a session musician at Camel Studios, where he met drummer Tony Cresswell, guitarist Ashley Mulford and bass player John Stimpson, all later to become members of Sad Café. The engineer at the studios, David Rohl, was working on an album called Mandalaband and asked Emerson to play keyboards on the album. This was when Mandalaband was formed, with Emerson becoming a member.

After the split of Mandalaband in 1976, Emerson moved into a flat with John Stimpson in Manchester, and they looked to form a new band. Needing a singer, they met Paul Young of the band Gyro, and this was when Sad Café was formed. The band had a No. 3 hit single in the UK with "Every Day Hurts", which was written by Emerson, Stimpson and Young, and produced by Eric Stewart of 10cc.

In 1981, Emerson became a member of 10cc. He toured with the band and played on the albums Ten Out of 10 (1981) and Windows in the Jungle (1983), as well as on Stewart's second solo album, Frooty Rooties (1982).

In 1985, a year after he left Sad Café, Emerson moved to Paris, France. While living there, he worked on various albums of local artists such as on Alain Bashung's Passé le Rio Grande (1986) and Novice (1989), Zazie's Zen (1995) and Emma Shapplin's Carmine Meo (1997).

After Paul Young's death in 2000, Emerson contributed on several tracks for the 2011 posthumous Paul Young album, Chronicles.

== Death ==
Emerson died in Paris aged 69 on 13 October 2018, of pancreatic cancer.
