= Eric Stewart =

English musician (born 1945)

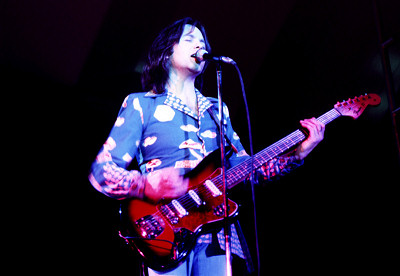
- Stewart in Oslo, Norway, 1976

Background information
- Born: Eric Michael Stewart; 20 January 1945 (age 81); Droylsden, Lancashire, England
- Genres: Art rock; pop rock
- Occupations: Musician; songwriter; record producer; audio engineer
- Instruments: Vocals; guitar; keyboards
- Years active: 1960–present

Eric Michael Stewart (born 20 January 1945) is an English singer-songwriter, multi-instrumentalist and record producer, best known as a founding member of the rock groups the Mindbenders with whom he played from 1963 to 1968, and likewise of 10cc from 1972 to 1995. Stewart co-owned Strawberry Studios in Stockport, England, from 1968 to the early 1980s, where he recorded albums with 10cc and artists including Neil Sedaka and Paul McCartney. Stewart collaborated with McCartney extensively in the 1980s, playing on or co-writing songs for McCartney's solo albums Tug of War (1982), Pipes of Peace (1983), Give My Regards to Broad Street (1984), and Press to Play (1986). Since 1980, Stewart has released four solo studio albums.

== Career ==
=== Early-mid 1960s: The Mindbenders ===
Eric Stewart was born 20 January 1945 in Droylsden, a housing overflow area for neighbouring Manchester, and now part of Greater Manchester. Around 1960, he joined local band Jerry Lee and the Staggerlees, which after a year changed its name to the Emperors of Rhythm. Stewart remained with the band for two years and was at the Oasis club in Manchester in early 1963 on the evening that Wayne Fontana had an audition with a record company representative. Fontana's drummer and guitarist did not turn up for the audition, and Fontana asked Stewart and drummer Ric Rothwell if they would 'sit in' for the audition. After a few minutes' rehearsal, the quartet played three well known songs of the time. Fontana was offered a record deal on condition that the musicians who played at the audition formed the band.

Fontana's band was called The Jets, but due to an existing band using the name, an alternative name had to be sought – it was decided that the band would take the name "The Mindbenders", which was the name of a film on release at the time – Wayne Fontana and the Mindbenders then came into being. The band initially played rhythm and blues relying on outside material; however, Stewart and Fontana co-wrote several songs during that period: "Since You've Been Gone" (with bassist Bob Lang), the B-side of the band's sixth single "The Game of Love" (April 1965), which hit No. 2 in the UK and No. 1 in the US, "One More Time" and "Long Time Comin'", the latter B-side of "It's Just a Little Bit Too Late" (June 1965).

The band toured the US with Herman's Hermits in July and August 1965, producing wild scenes Stewart compared with Beatlemania. "The hotels we stayed in were under constant guard by security people and there were always girls waiting outside in the hundreds", he recalled. "They were always yanking off my glasses and pulling out tufts of hair, which was very, very painful." The Mindbenders split with Fontana in late 1965 and continued with a successful UK and US No. 2 hit "A Groovy Kind of Love" in early 1966 with Stewart on vocals. They reached the top 20 later that year with "Ashes To Ashes". Stewart was also devoting more time to songwriting having written several B-sides ("Love Is Good", "My New Day and Age", "Yellow Brick Road", "The Man Who Loved Trees") and album tracks ("You Don't Know About Love", "The Morning After", "Rockin' Jaybee", the latter written with band members Bob Lang and Ric Rothwell). The group appeared in the 1967 film To Sir, with Love. Stewart became disenchanted with the Mindbenders towards the end of its existence, realising the material they were playing was drifting further from the music for which they had gained chart success.

"Because of the sort of records we'd had, everyone thought of us as a sort of ballads group, but we really weren't like that at all. I think we were probably the first of the three-piece heavy groups – but the sort of music we preferred to play was totally unacceptable to the sort of people who were prepared to book the Mindbenders", he said.

The band came to an ignominious end. "There were some pretty horrid gigs", Stewart later recalled. "One night we were booked to appear at a working men's club in Cardiff and when we arrived there we found that the posters outside the club said that starring that night was some Welsh tenor 'plus support group' – which meant us. That really choked me, the fact that we'd reached the stage where they didn't even bother to put our names up on the posters." The band accepted a booking playing cabaret shows for a week, wearing white suits and red silk shirts and telling jokes between the songs. After one particularly disastrous gig the band argued and Stewart angrily declared the Mindbenders were finished. He dropped the other members off at their homes after the gig and said, "That was the end of the Mindbenders. We never saw each other again after that."

=== 1968–1972: Strawberry Studios, Hotlegs ===
According to Stewart, the flow of royalties and publishing income from his work with the Mindbenders had left him "fairly comfortable" financially. In July 1968 he was invited by former Billy J. Kramer and the Dakotas road manager Peter Tattersall to become an investor in Inner City Studios, a small recording studio located above a music shop in Stockport. Stewart, who had been recording some demos of his own songs at the studio, invested £800. He explained: "I was infected with the idea of becoming a recording engineer and building a studio where I could develop my own ideas as to what a studio should be like." The pair moved to larger premises at no. 3 Waterloo Road in October and Stewart, who helped with renovations and painting, renamed the studio in honour of his favourite Beatles song, "Strawberry Fields Forever".

Within months the pair were joined by a further investor – songwriter and former Mindbenders bassist Graham Gouldman, who injected a further £2000. In mid-1969 Stewart and Gouldman began working with two other musicians, Lol Creme and Kevin Godley, on a project that rock manager and entrepreneur Giorgio Gomelsky was developing for his Marmalade Records label. Gomelsky was impressed with songs Godley and Creme had written and was planning to market them as a duo. Stewart was invited to play lead guitar at one session and he and Gouldman soon began offering the pair regular session work at Strawberry. (One single, "I'm Beside Myself" b/w "Animal Song" was issued under the name of Frabjoy and Runcible Spoon, plus two tracks on the Marmalade LP sampler 100 Proof issued under the names of Kevin & Lol and Graham Gouldman, before Marmalade closed its doors).

In December 1969, a deal was struck with the American record producers Jerry Kasenetz and Jeffry Katz of Super K Productions, to book the studios solidly for three months to record bubblegum songs, using the talents of Gouldman, Stewart, Godley and Creme. The income from the period of intense sessions allowed the owners to buy more equipment to turn it into "a real studio". "To begin with they were interested in Graham's songwriting and when they heard that he was involved in a studio I think they thought the most economical thing for them to do would be to book his studio and then put him to work there – but they ended up recording Graham's songs and then some of Kevin and Lol's songs, and we were all working together," Stewart said.

The trio of Stewart, Godley and Creme produced a song, "Neanderthal Man", which was released in June 1970 by Philips Records under the name of Hotlegs. The single became a worldwide hit, reaching No. 2 in Britain and No. 22 in the US, and was followed by an album, Thinks: School Stinks (1970), which Stewart later described as "a little ahead of its time". The trio released another single, "Umbopo", under the name of Doctor Father. The singles and album tracks were all engineered by Stewart.

Hotlegs embarked on a British tour supporting the Moody Blues in October 1970, with Gouldman playing bass. The tour was aborted after five nights when Moody Blues bassist and singer John Lodge became ill. When no further work for Hotlegs ensued, the band members agreed the band was defunct and resumed their session work.

=== 1972–1983, 1992–1995: 10cc ===
American singer Neil Sedaka began recording his Solitaire album at Strawberry Studios in early 1972, using Stewart as recording engineer, and Gouldman, Godley and Creme as his backing band. The album's success galvanised the four musicians to work on their own material and release it as a band. They recorded a Stewart–Gouldman song, "Waterfall", and Stewart took a demo of it to the Apple Records cutting room in London, where Sedaka's album was being mastered, hoping Apple would release it. Months later Apple wrote back to reject the song, saying it lacked commercial appeal.

By then they had recorded another song, Godley and Creme's "Donna", and realised the song "had something". Stewart phoned entrepreneur and producer Jonathan King, whom he had known since the Mindbenders days, and invited him to hear it. King was excited about the song, sensing a potential hit, and signed the band to his UK Records label, naming them 10cc. The song, released weeks later in August 1972, became a UK No. 2.

The first of the band's albums, 10cc (1973) contained four songs co-written by Stewart with various band members. His most productive writing partnership, however, was with Gouldman: the pair wrote some of the band's biggest-selling singles – including "Wall Street Shuffle", "I'm Not in Love" and "Art for Art's Sake" – and after the departure of Godley & Creme in 1976, Stewart and Gouldman settled into a strong songwriting partnership that lasted for the next six albums, though Stewart and Gouldman took a break from 10cc between 1984 and 1991.

By Mirror Mirror (1995) the team had dissolved as tensions between the pair grew. The album was an amalgam of solo material by Gouldman and Stewart, written and recorded separately, and was the final one for 10cc. Stewart has subsequently refused any offers and requests for a reunion.

The band had previously suffered a major setback in 1979 when Stewart was seriously injured in a car crash. He told the BBC:

It flattened me completely. I damaged my left ear, I damaged my eye very badly. I couldn't go near music. I couldn't go near anything loud and I love music and motor-racing. I had to stay away from both things for a long time, for about six months. And the momentum of this big machine that we'd had rolling slowed and slowed and slowed. And on the music scene, the punk thing had come in a big way. The Sex Pistols, the Clash, lots of things like that. So by the time I was fit again to play, I think we'd just missed the bus. It'd gone. And whatever we did after that, we got a few tickles here and there and we could continue touring forever on the strength of the past hits, but it didn't feel right again, we just didn't have that public with us.

In 2025, Gouldman said that the pair have not seen one another for decades. Godley does not speak to Stewart, but Creme and Stewart maintain a relationship of sorts, as both men are married to a pair of sisters.

=== Beyond 10cc ===
Stewart has engineered and/or produced albums recorded in Strawberry Studios including artists like Ramases (Space Hymns, 1971), Neil Sedaka (Solitaire, 1972, The Tra-La Days Are Over, 1973) and Justin Hayward and John Lodge (Blue Jays, 1975).

Stewart released two solo albums sandwiched between 10cc's 1980s output – Girls (1980) and Frooty Rooties (1982).

After 10cc split, Stewart continued his career as a producer and worked with Sad Café (Facades, 1979, Sad Café, 1980) and Agnetha Fältskog (Eyes of a Woman, 1985).

Stewart became involved with Paul McCartney from the early 1980s. He played on three of McCartney's albums (Tug of War, Pipes of Peace and Give My Regards to Broad Street), took part in the "Take It Away" and "So Bad" music videos as well as the Give My Regards to Broad Street film. Later Stewart started writing music together with McCartney which eventually led to Stewart co-writing more than half of Paul McCartney's Press to Play. Stewart's original role was also planned as a producer but during the early stages of work on the album he was replaced by Hugh Padgham, the choice he would later criticise. Padgham acknowledged their differences in 2024, "I remember it in a different way to Eric, and I kind of regret the way he talks about me. I had mucho respect for him, because I grew up listening to 10cc."

From 1990, Stewart began to participate as a guest vocalist on the last The Alan Parsons Project album Freudiana (1990) and later on Parsons' Try Anything Once (1993) and On Air (1996). Stewart reflected:

"I love the big love ballad on Freudiana and I loved doing Blue Blue Sky. 'On Air' is my favourite album."

In 2000s, Stewart returned to recording solo albums with Do Not Bend (2003), while his fourth solo album, Viva la Difference, was originally planned to come out in 2007, but delayed until 2009.

In 2017, Stewart released his autobiography titled The Things I Do for Love as an iOS ebook. The release was backed with a career spanning compilation album Anthology, with remastered songs some of which were newly mixed and retitled. The compilation was also co-mastered by Stewart himself.

== Discography ==
=== Studio albums ===
- Girls (1980)
- Frooty Rooties (1982)
- Do Not Bend (2003)
- Viva la Difference (2009)

=== Compilation albums ===
- Anthology (2017)

=== With The Alan Parsons Project/Alan Parsons ===
- Freudiana (1990)
- Try Anything Once (1993)
- On Air (1996)

=== As producer, engineer, composer or session musician ===
Year	Subject	Collaborator	Comment
1979	Facades	Sad Café	producer, engineer
1980	Sad Café	Sad Café	producer, engineer
1982	Tug of War	Paul McCartney	electric guitar, backing vocals
1983	Pipes of Peace	Paul McCartney	electric guitar, backing vocals
1984	Give My Regards to Broad Street	Paul McCartney	electric guitar, backing vocals
1985	Eyes of a Woman	Agnetha Fältskog	producer, writer "I Won't Be Leaving You" and "Save Me (Why Don't Ya)", co-writer "I Won't Let You Go" and "You're There", percussion, Fender Rhodes, backing vocals
1985	Explorers	The Explorers	backing vocals on "Falling For Nightlife"
1985	Moving Mountains	Justin Hayward	keyboards and engineer on "Goodbye"
1986	Press to Play	Paul McCartney	co-writer "Stranglehold", "Footprints", "Pretty Little Head", "Move Over Busker", "Angry", "However Absurd", "Write Away" and "Tough on a Tightrope", acoustic guitar, electric guitar, keyboards, backing vocals
1988	Crack The Whip	Manzanera & Mackay	additional backing vocals
2000	A Whale of a Tale! And Others	Sourmash a.k.a. Herman's Hermits	producer
2005	Nostalgia	July for Kings	producer, recording, mixing
2011	Chronicles	Paul Young	rhythm guitar, keyboards
2012	In Cosmic Winter	Negativehate	bass
