= Fontana Records =

Record label

- Parent company: Universal Music Group (1999–2012, 2019–present); Isolation Network (2012–2019)
- Founded: 1956; 70 years ago
- Distributors: Philips Records (1956–1972); PolyGram Group Distribution (1972–1999); Fontana Distribution (1999–2020); Virgin Music Group (2020–2025); Universal Music UK (since 2025)
- Genre: Various
- Country of origin: Netherlands
- Location: London
- Official website: https://fontana-records.com/

Fontana Records is a record label that started in 1956 as a subsidiary of the Dutch Philips Records. Fontana Distribution, an independent label distributor, takes its name from the label.

== History ==
Fontana began in 1956 as a subsidiary of the Dutch Philips Records. Fontana's U.S. counterpart label was started in 1964 and distributed by Philips US subsidiary Mercury Records. The initial single release (F 1501) was an instrumental track by British session drummer Bobby Graham, both sides featuring Jimmy Page on guitar. Among the hitmakers were Wayne Fontana & the Mindbenders (later on their own simply as The Mindbenders), The Troggs, The New Vaudeville Band, Manfred Mann, Dave Dee, Dozy, Beaky, Mick & Tich, and Steam.

In 2009, the label released Brooke Hogan's album.

The label was revived in 2025 as part of a restructuring of Universal Music UK's labels. It serves as the UK home for Universal Music's affiliated jazz labels: Blue Note, Verve Records, and Impulse!. The label's roster also includes pop artists who moved from Decca during the same restructuring.

== U.S. label variations ==
- 1964—Pink label
- 1965-1970—Light blue or slightly darker-toned blue label (some of these labels were stamped with an "S")
- 1980s—Black and silver label

== See also ==
- Lists of record labels
