= Longbranch Pennywhistle (album) =

Studio album by Longbranch Pennywhistle
- Released: 1970
- Studio: TTG Studios, Los Angeles, California
- Genre: Country rock, Folk rock
- Length: 30:18
- Label: Amos Records
- Producer: Tom Thacker

Longbranch Pennywhistle is an early-in-genre country rock album by Longbranch Pennywhistle, a duo featuring the then-little-known Glenn Frey and John David Souther. It also contains strains of folk rock. It was released in 1970; the duo split up shortly afterwards.

AllMusic's review of the album called it low-key and less commercial than the Eagles would be.

One of the album's songs, "Kite Woman", would resurface on Souther's 1972 debut solo album, John David Souther.

== Track listing ==
Side one

1. "Jubilee Anne" (Souther)
2. "Run, Boy, Run" (Frey)
3. "Rebecca" (Frey)
4. "Lucky Love" (Souther)
5. "Kite Woman" (Souther)
6. "Bring Back Funky Women" (Souther, Frey)

Side Two

1. "Star-Spangled Bus" (Souther)
2. "Mister, Mister" (Souther)
3. "Don't Talk Now" (James Taylor)
4. "Never Have Enough" (Souther)

== Personnel ==
- John David Souther - guitar, vocals, arrangements
- Glenn Frey - guitar, vocals, arrangements
- James Burton - guitar
- Ry Cooder - guitar
- Buddy Emmons - steel guitar
- Joe Osborn - bass
- Doug Kershaw - fiddle
- Larry Knechtel - piano
- Jim Gordon - drums

Technical

- Tom "Take-damn It" Thacker - producer
- James Bowen - supervisor
- Chuck Britz, Michael Lietz - engineer
