= Natural History (JD Souther album) =

Studio album by JD Souther
- Released: May 31, 2011
- Genre: Rock
- Length: 45:09
- Label: Entertainment One
- Producer: Fred Mollin

JD Souther chronology
If the World Was You (2008)	Natural History (2011)	Tenderness (2015)

Professional ratings
Review scores
Source	Rating
AllMusic	3.5/5 stars

Natural History is an album by JD Souther, released in 2011. It includes new recordings of some of his best known songs, many most prominently recorded by other artists; "Best of My Love" and "New Kid in Town" by the Eagles, "Faithless Love" and "Prisoner in Disguise" by Linda Ronstadt. The arrangements are spare featuring acoustic guitar and piano.

== Track listing ==
All songs written by JD Souther, except where noted.

1. "Go Ahead and Rain" – 3:29
2. "Faithless Love" – 4:07
3. "You're Only Lonely" – 4:07
4. "The Sad Cafe" (Don Henley, Glenn Frey, Joe Walsh, Souther) – 4:50
5. "Silver Blue" – 3:57
6. "New Kid in Town" (Henley, Frey, Souther) – 5:26
7. "I'll Take Care of You" – 2:25
8. "Little Victories" – 4:37
9. "Prisoner in Disguise" – 3:47
10. "Best of My Love" (Henley, Frey, Souther) – 4:34
11. "I'll Be Here at Closing Time" – 3:50
12. "How Long" - 3:27 (bonus track for Japan)
13. "Heartache Tonight" - 3:45 (bonus track for Japan)

== Personnel ==
- JD Souther – vocals, acoustic and electric guitar
- Chris Walters – piano
- John Hobbs – piano
- Bryan Sutton – acoustic and electric guitar
- Jim White – drums, percussion
- Viktor Krauss – upright bass
- Jerry Douglas – dobro
- Charlie McCoy – vibes
- Jeff Coffin – soprano and tenor saxophone
- Rod McGaha – trumpet
- John Jorgenson – clarinet, nylon string and electric guitar

Production notes

- Fred Mollin – producer
- Casey Wood, Dave Salley – engineer
- Kyle Lehning – mixer
- Alan Silverman – mastering
