= Only the Lonely (disambiguation) =

"Only the Lonely" is a 1960 song by Roy Orbison.

Only the Lonely may also refer to:

- Only the Lonely (film), a 1991 romantic comedy-drama
- "Only the Lonely" (Forever Knight), a television episode
- Only the Lonely: Roy Orbison's Life and Legacy, a 1989 biography of Roy Orbison by Alan Clayson

== Music ==
- Only the Lonely, an album by Colony House, 2017
- Only the Lonely (EP), or the title song (see below), by Unkle, 2011
- "Only the Lonely" (The Motels song), 1982
- "Only the Lonely" (T'Pau song), 1989
- "Only the Lonely", a song by David Gray from Sell, Sell, Sell
- "Only the Lonely", a song by Frank Sinatra from Frank Sinatra Sings for Only the Lonely, 1958
- "Only the Lonely", a song by Unkle from Where Did the Night Fall, 2010

== See also ==
- "Only Lonely", a song by Bon Jovi
- "Only Lonely" (Tina Arena song)
- "Only Lonely", a song by Hootie & the Blowfish from Musical Chairs
- You're Only Lonely, an album by J. D. Souther
  - "You're Only Lonely" (song), the title song
