= John David Souther (album) =

Studio album by JD Souther
- Released: 1972
- Genre: Country rock
- Length: 34:18
- Label: Asylum
- Producer: JD Souther, Fred Catero

JD Souther chronology
John David Souther (1972)	Black Rose (1976)

John David Souther is the debut album American singer-songwriter JD Souther, released in 1972. The song "How Long" was recorded by the Eagles for their 2007 album Long Road Out of Eden, from which it was released as a single. It was a Grammy award winner for them under the "Best Country Performance by a Duo or Group with Vocal" category. "Run Like a Thief" was covered by Bonnie Raitt on her album Home Plate.

== Background ==
Souther was one of the first artists signed by David Geffen to Asylum Records. Souther had previously collaborated with Glenn Frey in a folk duo called Longbranch Pennywhistle. Souther later joined with Chris Hillman and Richie Furay to form the Souther-Hillman-Furay Band after the release of his solo debut. They recorded two albums before he returned to his solo career.

== Reception ==
Professional ratings
Review scores
Source	Rating
AllMusic	4.5/5 stars
Christgau's Record Guide	C+

In his retrospective review for AllMusic, critic Lindsay Planer wrote the album "bears the same earthy Southwestern textures that are inextricably linked to the roots of the country/rock subgenre."

== Track listing ==
All songs by JD Souther.

1. "The Fast One" – 3:10
2. "Run Like a Thief" – 3:15
3. "Jesus in 3/4 Time" – 3:38
4. "Kite Woman" – 3:06
5. "Some People Call It Music" – 3:16
6. "White Wing" – 4:21
7. "It's the Same" – 3:32
8. "How Long" – 3:22
9. "Out to Sea" – 5:03
10. "Lullaby" – 1:35

== Personnel ==
- JD Souther – guitar, piano, vocals
- John Barbata – drums
- Michael Bowden – bass
- Fred Catero – guitar
- Ned Doheny – guitar
- Glenn Frey – guitar, piano, backing vocals
- Bryan Garofalo – bass
- Gib Guilbeau – fiddle, violin
- David Jackson – bass, piano, keyboards
- Gary Mallaber – drums, keyboards
- Mickey McGee – drums
- Wayne Perkins – guitar, slide guitar
- Joel Tepp – bass, harp

== Production ==
- Producers: JD Souther, Fred Catero
- Engineer: Fred Catero
- Art direction: Anthony Hudson
- Design: Anthony Hudson
- Photography: Frank Laffitte
