= Dream Baby (How Long Must I Dream) =

1962 song by Roy Orbison

Single by Roy Orbison

from the album Roy Orbison's Greatest Hits
- B-side: "The Actress"
- Released: February 10, 1962
- Recorded: January 9, 1962
- Studio: RCA Victor Studio B, Nashville, Tennessee
- Genre: Rockabilly
- Length: 2:34
- Label: Monument
- Songwriter: Cindy Walker
- Producer: Fred Foster

Roy Orbison singles chronology
"Crying" (1961)	"Dream Baby (How Long Must I Dream)" (1962)	"The Crowd" (1962)

"Dream Baby (How Long Must I Dream)" is a song written by Cindy Walker which was first recorded and released by Roy Orbison originally as a non-album single in 1962. It was a big international hit for Orbison, reaching number 2 in both the Australian and the UK singles charts and number 4 in the U.S. Billboard. It was also a top ten hit in Canada and Norway. Five months later, "Dream Baby" was included on Orbison's Greatest Hits compilation LP.

== Chart history ==
=== Weekly charts ===
Chart (1962)	Peak position
Australia (Kent Music Report)	2
Canada RPM Top Singles	8
Netherlands	9
New Zealand (Lever)	6
Norway VG-lista	5
UK Singles Chart (OCC)	2
US Billboard Hot 100	4
US Cash Box Top 100	9

=== Year-end charts ===
Chart (1962)	Rank
US Billboard Hot 100	65

== Personnel ==
Musicians:

- Roy Orbison - vocal
- Fred Carter, Jr. - rhythm guitar
- Grady Martin - electric guitar
- Bob Moore - double bass
- Buddy Harman - drums
- Boots Randolph - saxophone
- unknown - piano

== Glen Campbell version ==
"Dream Baby (How Long Must I Dream)"

Single by Glen Campbell

from the album The Last Time I Saw Her
- B-side: "Here and Now"
- Released: March 1, 1971
- Recorded: December 23, 1970
- Studio: T.T.G. Recording Studio, Hollywood, California
- Genre: Country
- Length: 2:32
- Label: Capitol
- Songwriter: Cindy Walker
- Producer: Al DeLory

Glen Campbell singles chronology
"It's Only Make Believe" (1970)	"Dream Baby (How Long Must I Dream)" (1971)	"The Last Time I Saw Her" (1971)

American country music artist Glen Campbell covered "Dream Baby" in 1971. It was released in March of that year as the lead single from his album The Last Time I Saw Her. The song peaked at number 7 on the U.S. Billboard Hot Country Singles chart. It also reached number 4 on the RPM Country Tracks chart in Canada.

Chart (1971)	Peak position
US Hot Country Songs (Billboard)	7
US Billboard Hot 100	31
U.S. Billboard Easy Listening	2
Canadian RPM Country Tracks	4
Canadian RPM Top Singles	20
Canadian RPM Adult Contemporary	6
New Zealand (Listener)	17
UK Singles Chart	39

== Lacy J. Dalton cover ==
A 1983 cover by American country music artist Lacy J. Dalton peaked at number 9 on the U.S. Billboard Hot Country Singles chart.

Chart (1983)	Peak position
US Hot Country Songs (Billboard)	9
Canadian RPM Country Tracks	10

== Other cover versions ==
The Beatles performed the song in front of a live studio audience on 7 March 1962 for the BBC radio programme Teenager's Turn, which was broadcast the following day. This was the Beatles' first ever BBC radio session. It has never been officially issued.

"Dream Baby" was also covered by Del Shannon in 1963, Jerry Lee Lewis in 1967 and also by Waylon Jennings. Perry Como on his 1971 I Think of You.

In 1995, Hootie & the Blowfish recorded their version for the movie soundtrack of White Man's Burden.
