= The Last Time I Saw Her (song) =

1968 song by Gordon Lightfoot

Song by Gordon Lightfoot

from the album Did She Mention My Name?
- Released: January 1968
- Recorded: December 1967
- Genre: Folk
- Length: 5:10
- Label: United Artists
- Songwriter: Gordon Lightfoot
- Producer: John Simon

"The Last Time I Saw Her"

Single by Glen Campbell

from the album The Last Time I Saw Her
- B-side: "Bach Talk"
- Released: June 21, 1971
- Recorded: April 20, 1971
- Studio: T.T.G. Recording Studio, Hollywood, California
- Genre: Country
- Length: 4:06
- Label: Capitol
- Songwriter: Gordon Lightfoot
- Producer: Al DeLory

Glen Campbell singles chronology
"Dream Baby (How Long Must I Dream)" (1971)	"The Last Time I Saw Her" (1971)	"Oklahoma Sunday Morning" (1971)

"The Last Time I Saw Her" is a song written and recorded by Canadian singer-songwriter Gordon Lightfoot and released in 1968. It was also recorded by American country music artist Glen Campbell, whose version was released in June 1971 as the second single from his album of the same name, The Last Time I Saw Her. Campbell’s version peaked at number 21 on both the U.S. Billboard Hot Country Singles chart and the RPM Country Tracks chart in Canada. Lightfoot had recorded the song for his 1968 album Did She Mention My Name?. Other artists who have recorded the song include Harry Belafonte (for his 1969 album Homeward Bound), John Arpin (for his 1974 album Love and Maple Syrup), Johnny Mathis (as the B-side of his recording of another of Lightfoot's songs, "Wherefore and Why"), Andy Williams (as the B-side of North American releases of his single "Music from Across the Way"), and Keola & Kapono Beamer (for their 1982 album Tahiti Holiday). In 1974, a Finnish version, "Sun Piirtees Vielä Nään", was recorded by Tapio Heinonen for his album Lämmöllä.

== Chart performance ==
Chart (1971)	Peak position
US Hot Country Songs (Billboard)	21
US Billboard Hot 100	61
U.S. Billboard Easy Listening	12
Canadian RPM Country Tracks	21
Canadian RPM Top Singles	42
Canadian RPM Adult Contemporary	27
