= Black Rose (JD Souther album) =

Studio album by JD Souther
- Released: 1976
- Studio: The Sound Station
- Genre: Soft rock
- Length: 39:45
- Label: Asylum
- Producer: Peter Asher

JD Souther chronology
John David Souther (1972)	Black Rose (1976)	You're Only Lonely (1979)

Black Rose is the second album by American singer-songwriter JD Souther, released in 1976. It includes Souther's version of "Faithless Love" released by Linda Ronstadt in 1974. Ronstadt would later cover "Simple Man, Simple Dream" and "Silver Blue" from this album.

== Reception ==
Professional ratings
Review scores
Source	Rating
Allmusic	3.5/5 stars

In his retrospective review for Allmusic, critic William Ruhlmann called it an "excellent album steeped in the Southern California country-rock sound of the '70s". In a review for Rolling Stone, Stephen Holden wrote, "John David Souther’s second solo album benefits from a beautiful, all-star Peter Asher production. More sophisticated than either his first album or the two Souther-Hillman-Furay albums, Black Rose underscores Souther’s melodic writing, his strongest point, with some genuinely innovative arrangements by David Campbell, the classically trained musician who scored “Prisoner in Disguise" for Linda Ronstadt. "Silver Blue," much of which Campbell has scored as a duet for voice and plucked double bass and violas, is a starkly arresting production, while setting "Faithless Love" into a semiformal piece for voice, acoustic guitar and chamber ensemble transforms a prettier-than-average country-rock ballad into an eloquent one. "Doors Swing Open," a complex tune based on ninth and minor sixth chords, boasts an elegantly lush arrangement that both gives it shape and highlights its lovely chromaticism."

"Midnight Prowl" was a minor hit in Boston in 1976.

== Track listing ==
All songs written by JD Souther.

1. "Banging My Head Against the Moon" – 3:41
2. "If You Have Crying Eyes" – 5:05
3. "Your Turn Now" – 3:48
4. "Faithless Love" – 3:33
5. "Baby Come Home" – 3:47
6. "Simple Man, Simple Dream" – 1:49
7. "Silver Blue" – 4:15
8. "Midnight Prowl" – 5:09
9. "Doors Swing Open" – 4:42
10. "Black Rose" – 3:56

== Personnel ==
- JD Souther – acoustic guitar, congas, ARP String Ensemble, lead vocals, backing vocals
- Peter Asher – percussion, piano, electric piano, cabasa, shaker, vocals, backing vocals
- James Bond – double bass
- Michael Botts – drums
- Donald Byrd – flugelhorn, horn
- David Campbell – arranger, conductor, viola
- Stanley Clarke – bass, double bass
- Ronald Cooper – cello
- David Crosby – vocals, backing vocals
- Vincent De Rosa – horn, French horn
- Ned Doheny – guitar, backing vocals
- Chuck Domanico – bass guitar
- Robert Dubow – violin
- David Duke – horn, French horn
- Earl Dumler – flute, oboe
- James Dunham – viola
- Kenny Edwards – bass
- Glenn Frey – guitar, electric guitar, electric piano, backing vocals
- Art Garfunkel – vocals, backing vocals
- Lowell George – guitar, slide guitar
- Andrew Gold – guitar, piano, electric guitar, ARP String Ensemble, tambourine, vocals, backing vocals
- Pamela Goldsmith – viola
- John Guerin – drums
- Don Henley – vocals, backing vocals
- Dennis Karmazyn – cello
- Ray Kelly – cello
- Jim Keltner – drums
- Danny "Kootch" Kortchmar – guitar, electric guitar
- Russ Kunkel – drums
- Kathleen Lenski – violin
- Don Menza – flute
- Roy Poper – flugelhorn, horn, French horn
- Linda Ronstadt – vocals, backing vocals, harmony vocals, gut-string guitar
- Sheldon Sanov – violin
- Harry Shlutz – cello
- Haim Shtrum – violin
- Paul Stallworth – bass
- Charles Veal – violin
- Waddy Wachtel – electric guitar
- Joe Walsh – guitar, slide guitar
- John Wittenberg – violin

== Production ==
- Producer: Peter Asher
- Engineers: Val Garay, Greg Ladanyi
- Mastering: Doug Sax
- Arranger: David Campbell
- Direction: Elliot Roberts
- Art Direction: Jimmy Wachtel
- Design: Jimmy Wachtel
- Photography: Lorrie Sullivan

== Charts ==
Album – Billboard (North America)

Year	Chart	Position
1976	Pop Albums	85
