= Tenderness (JD Souther album) =

Studio album by JD Souther
- Released: May 12, 2015
- Genre: AC
- Length: 35:24
- Label: Sony Masterworks
- Producer: Larry Klein

JD Souther chronology
Natural History (2011)	Tenderness (2015)

Professional ratings
Review scores
Source	Rating
AllMusic	4/5 stars

Tenderness is an album by JD Souther, released in 2015 on Sony Masterworks. It is Souther's first album of new songs since 2008's If the World Was You.

== Track listing ==
All songs written by JD Souther, except where noted.

1. "Come What May" – 3:16
2. "Something in the Dark" (Souther, Larry Klein) – 4:20
3. "This House" – 4:03
4. "Let's Take a Walk" (Souther, Klein) – 3:37
5. "Dance Real Slow" – 4:47
6. "Show Me What You Mean" – 2:33
7. "Horses in Blue" – 4:28
8. "Need Somebody" – 3:01
9. "Downtown (Before the War)" – 5:19
10. "All Your Wishes" - 4:09 (bonus track for Japan)

== Personnel ==
- JD Souther – vocals, acoustic and electric guitar, background vocals
- Dean Parks – electric guitar
- David Piltch – bass
- Jay Bellerose – drums, percussion
- Patrick Warren – piano, electric piano, organ, keyboards
- Till Brönner – trumpet
- Mark Robertson – violin
- Alyssa Park – violin
- Luke Maurer – viola
- Vanessa Freebairn-Smith – cello
- Larry Klein – keyboards
- Chris Walters – piano
- Billy Childs – piano
- Lizz Wright – vocals, background vocals
- Jeff Coffin – soprano saxophone
- Matt Nelson – cello
- Sam Bacca – percussion

Production

- Larry Klein – producer
- Lynne Earls – engineer
- Nicolas Essig, Pablo Hernandez, Noah Dresner – assistant engineer
- Billy Childs – strings arrangements
- Tim Palmer – mixing engineer
- Bernie Grundman – mastering
