= The Last Time I Saw Her =

Studio album by Glen Campbell
- Released: July 1971
- Recorded: 1971
- Studio: TTG Studios, Hollywood, California
- Genre: Folk
- Label: Capitol
- Producer: Al De Lory

Glen Campbell chronology
The Glen Campbell Goodtime Album (1970)	The Last Time I Saw Her (1971)	Anne Murray / Glen Campbell (1971)

The Last Time I Saw Her is the 20th studio album by American singer/guitarist Glen Campbell, released by Capitol Records in 1971.

== Track listing ==
Side 1:

1. "The Last Time I Saw Her" (Gordon Lightfoot) – 4:06
2. "Rose Garden" (Joe South) – 2:44
3. "Help Me Make It Through the Night" (Kris Kristofferson) – 2:18
4. "She Understands Me" (Jerry Hubbard) – 2:34
5. "He Ain't Heavy, He's My Brother" (Bobby Scott, Bob Russell) – 3:25

Side 2:

1. "If You Could Read My Mind" (Gordon Lightfoot) – 3:45
2. "Dream Baby (How Long Must I Dream)" (Cindy Walker) – 2:37
3. "Today Is Mine" (Jerry Hubbard) – 3:37
4. "Here We Go Again" (Russell Steagall, Don Lanier) – 2:26
5. "Theme From 'Love Story'" (Francis Lai, Carl Sigman) – 3:01

== Personnel ==
- Glen Campbell – vocals, acoustic guitar
- Larry McNeely – acoustic guitar
- Louis Shelton – acoustic guitar
- Hal Blaine – drums
- Carol Kaye – bass guitar
- Bill Graham – bass guitar

== Production ==
- Producer – Al De Lory
- Arranged and conducted by Al De Lory and Marty Paich
- Engineer – Chuck Britz
- Photography – Rick Rankin
- Liner photo – Frank Laffitte

== Charts ==
Album – Billboard (United States)

Chart	Entry date	Peak position	No. of weeks
Billboard Country Albums	July 31, 1971	6	22
Billboard 200	July 8, 1971	87	9

Singles – Billboard (United States)

Year	Single	Hot Country Singles	Hot 100	Easy Listening
1971	"Dream Baby (How Long Must I Dream)"	7	31	2
1971	"Last Time I Saw Her"	21	61	12
