= Westlake Recording Studios =

Recording studio in California, US

Coordinates: 34.09095°N 118.348461°W

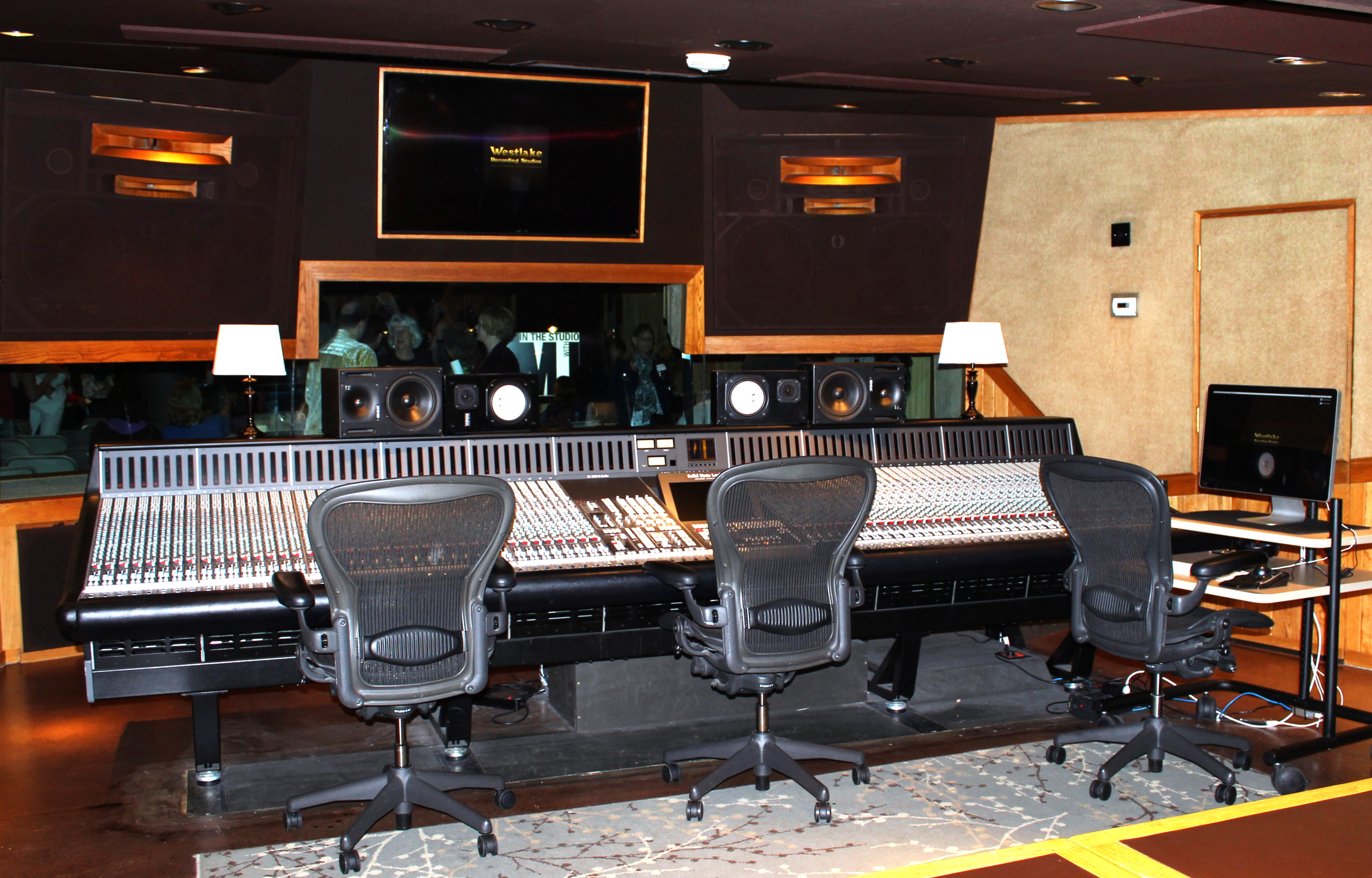
- A mixing desk in Westlake Studios
- Type: Recording studio
- Industry: Music, radio drama
- Founded: 1970s
- Founder: Tom Hidley & Glenn Phoenix
- Headquarters: West Hollywood, California, U.S.
- Number of locations: 2
- Website: westlakestudios.com

Westlake Recording Studios is a music recording studio with two locations in Los Angeles and West Hollywood, California.

== History ==
Westlake Recording Studios was founded in the early 1970s by the American audio engineer Tom Hidley under the name Westlake Audio. Hidley was experienced in the development of audio technology, having collaborated with Madman Muntz in the development of the first car stereo in 1959, and along with Amnon "Ami" Hadani, he had previously set up another recording studio in Hollywood, TTG Studios, in 1965. The layout of the rooms at Westlake Studios aimed for an acoustic design that could give a fairly flat frequency response at the recording position, with low reverberation delay and extensive use of bass traps. As the need to transfer audio material between different studios grew, there was an increasing demand for standardization across the recording industry; the success of Hidley's acoustic design was copied at other sites, and "Westlake-style" rooms spread to a number of other studios by the late 1970s. Westlake has been credited as "one of the first big commercial efforts to produce acoustically standardised 'interchangeable' rooms".

Artists who have recorded music at Westlake Studios have included Rihanna, the Weeknd, Kygo, Charli XCX, Café Quijano, Donna Summer, Giorgio Moroder, Quincy Jones, Billy Idol, Bruce Swedien, Gilberto Gil, Missy Elliott, Madonna, Marilyn Manson, Aaliyah and Justin Timberlake. Notable recordings produced at Westlake Studios have included Michael Jackson's album, Thriller (April–November 1982), the number-one-selling album of all time; and Alanis Morissette's Jagged Little Pill (1994–1995).

Westlake Studios have also been used to produce audio material for films, television shows and commercials. In June 1980, National Public Radio, in a co-production with the BBC, used Westlake Studios to record a 13-part radio adaptation of Star Wars. NPR returned to Westlake in 1996 to record its production of Return of the Jedi.

== Recording studios ==
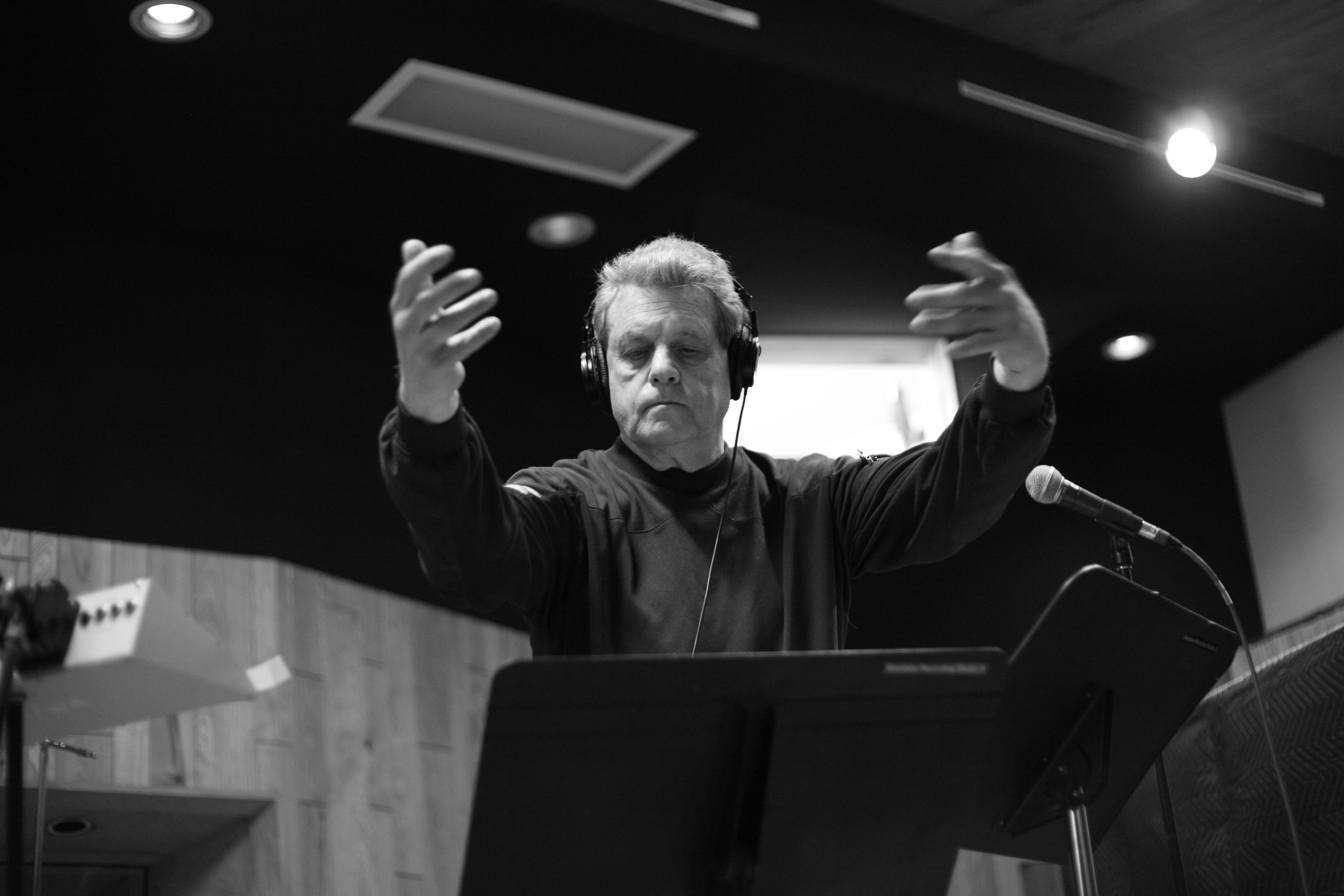
Buddy Bregman recording his last album sessions in Studio D at Westlake, May 2006

Westlake has a total of seven recording studios, including four with full size live rooms, two production rooms and a mixing suite.

Studios A and B are located on Beverly Boulevard in Beverly Grove, Los Angeles and Studios C, D, E, Production Room 1 and Production Room 2 are located on Santa Monica Boulevard in West Hollywood.

=== Studio A ===
Studio A is one of the most historic rooms at Westlake. The control room of Studio A features an 80-channel Solid State Logic XL 9000 K console and a 1,200-square-foot (110 m^{2}) tracking room, including a large piano isolation room. Studio A was where Michael Jackson's Thriller was recorded in 1982.

=== Studio B ===
Studio B is a full size studio that features a 72-channel Solid State Logic 4072 G series console and a large selection of outboard gear. It has a 500-square-foot (46 m^{2}) tracking room and a 65-square-foot (6.0 m^{2}) isolation room.

=== Studio C ===
Studio C is a full size studio that features a 72-channel Solid State Logic 9072 J series console and a large selection of outboard gear. It has a 1,000-square-foot (93 m^{2}) tracking room and a large private lounge.

=== Studio D ===
Studio D is Westlake's largest room. It features a Solid State Logic XL 9000 K console and a large selection of outboard gear. The main tracking area is 1,120 square feet (104 m^{2}) and there is a 200-square-foot (19 m^{2}) piano isolation room and a 176-foot (54 m) isolation room. Studio D has a private entrance and features 3 lounge areas including a loft that overlooks the tracking room. Because Thriller had broken global sales records, Westlake custom-built Studio D specifically to accommodate Michael Jackson, producer Quincy Jones, and lead engineer Bruce Swedien for the intense Bad recording sessions. Studio D was where Michael Jackson's Bad was recorded .

=== Studio E ===
Studio E is a mixing suite that features a Solid State Logic 9072 J Series console. Out of all the studios at Westlake, Studio E has the largest selection of outboard gear. Studio E has a 52-square-foot (4.8 m^{2}) vocal booth and a private lounge.

=== Production Suites 1 & 2 ===
In addition to the five studios, Westlake has two smaller production rooms designed for overdubs, writing and mixing. Both of these rooms contain Solid State Logic AWS 900+'s, 24-channel controlled analog consoles. Both rooms contain small tracking rooms fit to record vocals, guitar, bass and many other smaller instruments.
