= Tom Hidley =

American recording studio designer and audio engineer (1931–2025)

- Born: May 27, 1931; Los Angeles, California, U.S.
- Died: May 2, 2025 (aged 93); Bangkok, Thailand

Tom Hidley (May 27, 1931 – May 2, 2025) was an American recording studio designer and audio engineer whose companies have been responsible for the design of hundreds of professional studios worldwide since 1965. He coined the term "bass trap" and is credited with a number of recording studio design innovations, including soffit-mounted monitor speakers and sliding glass doors between live and isolation rooms.

== Life and career ==
=== Background and early career ===
As a teenager, Hidley spent long hours playing the saxophone, clarinet, and flute until ordered by his physician to cease after suffering a physical breakdown. Turning to other music-related activities, Hidley began working at loudspeaker and tape-machine companies while recording at clubs after-hours. By 1956, he was working for JBL Loudspeaker Co. and performing audio engineering at custom installations, including installations in the homes of Frank Sinatra, Ella Fitzgerald, Lucille Ball, and Danny Kaye.

In 1959, Madman Muntz hired Hidley to assist with the development of the first car stereo. Among the first to own a Muntz car stereo was Sinatra and through Sinatra's purchase, Hidley became known to Sinatra associate Val Valentin, who invited Hildley to assist in the building of the MGM/Verve recording studios in New York in 1962. Two years later, Phil Ramone hired Hidley to be the audio technical manager of A & R Recording in Midtown Manhattan. Ami Hadani was also employed there at the time. In 1965, both Hidley and Hadani left A & R, moved to Los Angeles, and founded TTG Studios.

While at A & R, Hidley had begun experimenting with building monitor speakers whose frequency range extended to lower frequencies than the available speakers of the time. At TTG, he modified an 8-track recorder to create one of the first 16-track, 2-inch tape recorders in the world. In 1968, after visiting Hidley's studio with Animals frontman Eric Burdon, Jimi Hendrix excitedly told Record Plant founders Gary Kellgren and Chris Stone about how great the studio sounded. Kellgren and Stone visited TTG and were so impressed with Hidley that they contracted Hidley to design a new Record Plant studio in Los Angeles. Record Plant West opened in December 1969; Hidley became the director of technical operations for all Record Plant locations. He continued to design and innovate, including creating the drum booth and the use of sliding glass doors to separate isolation booths from live rooms.

=== Westlake Audio and Eastlake Audio ===
While at Record Plant, Hidley also began selling professional audio equipment system packages from the garage of his home in Westlake Village, which is next to Thousand Oaks, California. He named his company Westlake Audio. In 1971, Hidley partnered with Glenn Phoenix and Paul Ford to open Westlake Audio on Wilshire Boulevard in Los Angeles. Westlake specialized in selling complete recording studio packages, including not only the design and construction of a studio space but all of the related pro audio equipment. That included a line of Hidley-designed speakers. Westlake was highly influential in standardizing acoustic design in the recording industry, with prospective studio clients commonly seeking out "Westlake rooms."

In 1975, after spending a few years on three new Westlake-designed studios in Europe-one for The Moody Blues rock band, The Manor Studio, for businessman Richard Branson's Virgin Records in England and Mountain Studios for country/pop singer Anita Kerr in Montreux southeast of Lausanne, Switzerland. Hidley returned to the US and proposed opening a European Westlake Audio office. His partners unanimously opposed the idea, so Hidley sold his share of Westlake and founded Eastlake Audio in Switzerland, where he continued to design studios and sell monitor speakers. Sierra Audio, a sister company to Kent Duncan's Burbank recording studio Kendun Recorders, was formed to represent Eastlake Audio in the Western Hemisphere, South America, and the Pacific.

=== Hidley Designs ===
In 1980, Hidley sold Eastlake Audio and moved to Hawaii with the intent to retire, but when Harumitsu Machijiri wanted Hidley to design Sedic Studios' new facilities in Tokyo, Hidley accepted on the condition that he would design and build two rooms: the first a Westlake/Eastlake design, and the second a new improved design. Once built, the better-sounding room would be kept while the other would then be subsequently demolished and rebuilt to match the improved design. Machijiri agreed and Hidley worked with former Pioneer speaker designer Shozo Kinoshita on the project. Inspired by his new "Non-Environment" control room concepts, Hidley returned to both the studio design business and Switzerland, where he founded Hidley Designs in 1986.

=== Later life and death ===
In 2005, Hidley and his wife moved to Australia on his four-year retirement visa. He died at his home in Bangkok, Thailand, on May 2, 2025, at the age of 93.
