= Oklahoma Sunday Morning =

- German release picture sleeve

Single by Glen Campbell
- B-side: "Everybody's Got to Go There Sometime"
- Released: December 6, 1971
- Genre: Country
- Length: 2:55
- Label: Capitol
- Songwriter(s): Tony Macaulay, Albert Hammond and Lee Hazlewood
- Producer(s): Al DeLory

Glen Campbell singles chronology
| "The Last Time I Saw Her" (1971) | "Oklahoma Sunday Morning" (1971) | "Manhattan, Kansas" (1972) |

"Oklahoma Sunday Morning" is a song written by Tony Macaulay, Albert Hammond and Lee Hazlewood. It was recorded by American country music artist Glen Campbell and released in December 1971 as a single. The song peaked at number 15 on the U.S. Billboard Hot Country Singles chart and number 9 the RPM Country Tracks chart in Canada.

== Chart performance ==
| Chart (1971–1972) | Peak position |
|---|---|
| US Hot Country Songs (Billboard) | 15 |
| US Billboard Hot 100 | 104 |
| U.S. Billboard Easy Listening | 36 |
| Canadian RPM Country Tracks | 9 |
