= Roy Orbison's Greatest Hits =

Greatest hits album by Roy Orbison
- Released: August 1, 1962
- Recorded: 1959 – 1962
- Studio: RCA Victor Studio B, Nashville, Tennessee
- Genre: Rock and roll, rockabilly
- Length: 28:38
- Label: Monument (M 4009)
- Producer: Fred Foster

Roy Orbison chronology
Crying (1962)	Roy Orbison's Greatest Hits (1962)	In Dreams (1963)

Roy Orbison's Greatest Hits is a Roy Orbison record album from Monument Records recorded at the RCA Studio B in Nashville, and released on August 1, 1962, and was available both in stereo and mono. Between the hit songs were also "Love Star" and "Evergreen", which were released here for the first time.

The single, "Dream Baby (How Long Must I Dream)", debuted on the Billboard Hot 100 in the issue dated February 17, 1962, peaking at number four during its 12-week stay. on the Cashbox singles, it reached number nine during its 12-week stay. and number two in The U.K during its 14-week stay. Another Single "The Crowd", debuted on the Billboard Hot 100 in the issue dated June 2, 1962, peaking at number 26 during its 10-week stay. number 21 on the Cashbox during its 11-week stay. and number 40 in The UK during its four-week stay.

According to the authorised Roy Orbison biography, this was Orbison's third album on the Monument label, and his first greatest hits compilation. It was a success remaining in the charts for 140 weeks, when it debuted on the Billboard Top LPs chart in the issue dated September 1, 1962, peaking at number 13. it entered the UK album charts 5 years later, on September 30, 1967, and it spent its only week on the album chart there at number 40. It reached No. 16 on the Cashbox albums chart for it spent 86 weeks. It was re-released in 1967 after his departure from Monument Records.

The album received Gold certification from the Recording Industry Association of America on March 24, 1966. Bear Family included also the album in the 2001 Orbison 1955-1965 box set.

== Reception ==
Professional ratings
Review scores
Source	Rating
AllMusic	3/5 stars
The Encyclopedia of Popular Music	4/5 stars
Record Mirror	4/5 stars

Billboard admired the "great individual performances in the dramatic Orbison style throughout" the album.

Cash Box stated Orbison's "rich full-bodied voice is perfectly suited to such coinpulling merchandise as 'Only the Lonely', 'Crying' and 'The Crowd'.

Both Record Mirror and The Encyclopedia of Popular Music gave the album four-star ratings. while getting a lower three-star rating from AllMusic.

== Track listing ==
Side one
No.	Title	Writer(s)	Length
1.	"The Crowd"	Roy Orbison, Joe Melson	2:19
2.	"Love Star"	Cindy Walker	2:58
3.	"Crying"	Roy Orbison, Joe Melson	2:45
4.	"Evergreen"	Joe Tanner	2:43
5.	"Running Scared"	Roy Orbison, Joe Melson	2:10
6.	"Mama"	Roy Orbison, Joe Melson, Ray Rush	2:58

Side two
No.	Title	Writer(s)	Length
1.	"Candy Man"	Beverly Ross, Fred Neil	2:48
2.	"Only the Lonely"	Roy Orbison, Joe Melson	2:24
3.	"Dream Baby (How Long Must I Dream)"	Cindy Walker	2:35
4.	"Blue Angel"	Roy Orbison, Joe Melson	2:50
5.	"Uptown"	Roy Orbison, Joe Melson	2:05
6.	"I'm Hurtin'"	Roy Orbison, Joe Melson	2:43

== Charts ==
Chart (1962)	Peak position
US Top LPs (Billboard)	13
US Cashbox	16
UK Albums Chart	40

=== Singles ===
Year	Title	US Hot 100	US Cashbox	UK singles
1962	"Dream Baby (How Long Must I Dream)"	4	9	4
1962	"The Crowd"	26	21	40

== Billboard & UK singles chart positions for previously Singles ==
Song	US chart debut	Hot 100	U.S. Cashbox	UK chart debut	UK singles chart
"Uptown"	January 18, 1960	72	70	–	–
"Only the Lonely"	June 6, 1960	2	2	August 3, 1960	3
"Blue Angel"	September 1, 1960	9	13	November 2, 1960	11
"I'm Hurtin'	December 12, 1960	27	28	–	–
"Running Scared"	April 10, 1961	1	1	May 31, 1961	9
"Crying"	August 14, 1961	2	1	September 27, 1961	25
"Candy Man"	August 7, 1961	25	34	–	–
