= You're Only Lonely =

Studio album by JD Souther
- Released: 1979
- Studios: Warner Bros. Recording Studio, North Hollywood, CA
- Genres: Rock; folk rock
- Length: 35:27
- Label: Columbia
- Producer: JD Souther

JD Souther chronology
Black Rose (1976)	You're Only Lonely (1979)	Home by Dawn (1984)

You're Only Lonely is the third studio album by American singer-songwriter JD Souther, released in 1979 by Columbia Records. The title song charted as a single on Billboard, reaching No.1 on the Adult Contemporary chart. "White Rhythm & Blues" was covered by Linda Ronstadt on her album Living in the USA. In 1992, George Strait covered "The Last in Love", for the soundtrack to the film Pure Country.

== Critical reception ==
Professional ratings
Review scores
Source	Rating
AllMusic	4/5 stars

The New York Times concluded that "Souther's trouble is that his voice simply isn't very interesting, at least in a folk-rock context on recording."

In his retrospective review for AllMusic, critic William Ruhlmann praised "White Rhythm and Blues" as well as the solo version of the Souther–Hillman–Furay Band song "Trouble in Paradise".

== Track listing ==
All tracks are written by JD Souther, except where noted.

No.	Title	Writer(s)	Length
1.	"You're Only Lonely"		3:48
2.	"If You Don't Want My Love"		4:22
3.	"The Last in Love"	Glenn Frey, Souther	3:40
4.	"White Rhythm and Blues"		4:39
5.	"'Til the Bars Burn Down"	Frey, Souther	4:42
6.	"The Moon Just Turned Blue"		2:08
7.	"Songs of Love"		4:18
8.	"Fifteen Bucks"	Kenny Edwards, Don Grolnick, Danny Kortchmar, Rick Marotta, Souther, Waddy Wachtel	3:24
9.	"Trouble in Paradise"		4:26

== Personnel ==
- JD Souther – vocals, guitar
- David Sanborn – alto saxophone
- Tom Scott – tenor saxophone
- Glenn Frey – guitar
- Don Felder – rhythm guitar
- Danny Kortchmar – guitar
- Waddy Wachtel – guitar, harmony vocals
- Fred Tackett – acoustic guitar
- Dan Dugmore – steel guitar
- Kenny Edwards – bass guitar, harmony vocals
- Don Grolnick – piano
- Jai Winding – organ
- John Sebastian – harmonica
- Jackson Browne – vocals on "You're Only Lonely"
- Jorge Calderón – vocals, harmony vocals
- Phil Everly – harmony vocals on "White Rhythm and Blues"
- Don Henley – vocals
- Mike Botts – drums
- Rick Marotta – drums

== Production ==
- Producer: JD Souther
- Engineers: Loyd Clifft, Lee Herschberg
- Direction: Irving Azoff
- Art direction: Jimmy Wachtel
- Photography: Jim Shea

== Charts ==
Chart (1979)	Peak position
Australia (Kent Music Report)	65
US Top LPs & Tape (Billboard)	41
