= Home by Dawn =

Studio album by JD Souther
- Released: 1984
- Studio: Emerald Sound, Nashville; Record One, Los Angeles
- Genre: Rock
- Length: 32:43
- Label: Warner Bros.
- Producer: David Malloy

JD Souther chronology
You're Only Lonely (1979)	Home by Dawn (1984)	If the World Was You (2008)

Home by Dawn is the fourth album by American singer-songwriter JD Souther, released in 1984.

== Critical reception ==
Professional ratings
Review scores
Source	Rating
AllMusic	3/5 stars
The Philadelphia Inquirer	4/5 stars

Musician reviewer J. D. Considine wrote simply: "Don't wait up." The Philadelphia Inquirer deemed Home by Dawn "one of the best, most enjoyable L.A. rock albums in years." The New York Times noted that "although his idiom certainly is reminiscent of the Eagles', his very lack of dominant commercial success helps preserve his sense of freshness."

== Track listing ==
All songs written by JD Souther, except where noted.

1. "Home by Dawn" – 2:49
2. "Go Ahead and Rain" – 3:31
3. "Say You Will" (Souther, Danny Kortchmar) – 2:51
4. "I'll Take Care of You" – 2:32
5. "All for You" – 3:31
6. "Night" (Souther, Waddy Wachtel) – 3:29
7. "Don't Know What I'm Gonna Do" – 2:09
8. "Bad News Travels Fast" – 5:52
9. "All I Want" – 5:59

== Personnel ==
- JD Souther – guitar, piano, drums, vocals, backing vocals
- Steve Goldstein – keyboards on "Night"
- Don Henley – vocals, backing vocals
- David Hungate – bass
- Vince Melamed – keyboards
- Josh Leo – guitar
- Russ Martin – backing vocals
- Randy McCormick – keyboards
- Linda Ronstadt – vocals on "Say You Will"
- Timothy B. Schmit – vocals, backing vocals
- Waddy Wachtel – guitar on "Night"
- Billy Joe Walker Jr. – guitar

Production

- David Malloy - producer
- Richard Bosworth - engineer
- Joe Bogan - recording
- Niko Bolas, Russ Martin - additional vocal recording
