= JD Souther =

American singer, songwriter and actor (1945–2024)

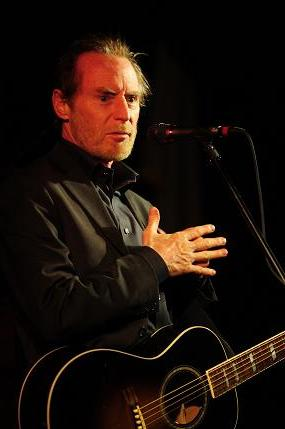
- Souther performing in 2008

Background information
- Born: John David Souther; November 2, 1945; Detroit, Michigan, U.S.
- Died: September 17, 2024 (aged 78) Sandia Park, New Mexico, U.S.
- Genres: Pop rock; country rock; folk rock; soft rock
- Occupations: Singer; songwriter; musician
- Instruments: Guitar; vocals
- Years active: 1965–2024
- Label: Elektra
- Formerly of: Longbranch Pennywhistle; Souther-Hillman-Furay Band
- Website: www.jdsouther.net

John David Souther (/saʊðər/; November 2, 1945 – September 17, 2024) was an American singer, songwriter, and actor. He was "a principal architect of the Southern California sound and a major influence on a generation of songwriters". Souther wrote and co-wrote songs recorded by Linda Ronstadt and some of the Eagles' biggest hits, including "Best of My Love", "Victim of Love", "Heartache Tonight" and "New Kid in Town". "How Long", which appeared on the Eagles' Long Road Out of Eden, came from Souther's first solo album. He recorded two hit songs in his solo career: "You're Only Lonely" (1979) and "Her Town Too" (1981), a duet with James Taylor. He had a brief acting career and appeared on TV and in movies. He played with the Eagles on their 2008 farewell tour.

== Early life and career ==
Souther was born on November 2, 1945, in Detroit, Michigan, the son of John Souther and Loty (née Finley), and was raised in Amarillo, Texas. His father sang in a jazz band and later ran a store selling records and musical instruments. His grandmother was an opera singer, and the first song he learned as a child was Puccini's "Nessun Dorma". He learned to play the violin, and later clarinet, saxophone and guitar. He attended Amarillo college but dropped out to play drums with his first band, The Cinders.

His first recordings were made with The Cinders at the nearby Norman Petty Recording Studios in Clovis, New Mexico. The band's first 45 rpm record was released on the RIC label in 1965. The following year, Norman Petty successfully shopped their recordings to Warner Bros. Records for a second single release under the name John David and The Cinders.

After living in New York and Florida, Souther moved to Los Angeles in 1969 and met musician and songwriter Glenn Frey. They became roommates and musical collaborators and briefly performed as folk duo Longbranch Pennywhistle. They released an album in 1970 on Jimmy Bowen's Amos Records. Souther helped the Eagles to form as a backing band for Linda Ronstadt, and when they branched out on their own, he played with them at the Troubadour on LA's Sunset Strip.

Souther declined an offer to join the Eagles and instead signed to David Geffen's Asylum label and recorded a debut solo studio album under his own name. In 1972 he formed the Souther–Hillman–Furay Band with Chris Hillman of The Byrds and Richie Furay of Buffalo Springfield. The group released two albums which failed to sell and the band split up. Souther wrote the song "Run Like a Thief", which appeared on Bonnie Raitt's 1975 album, Home Plate.

1976 saw the release of Souther's second solo LP, Black Rose, produced by Peter Asher and considered by many to be his finest work. It featured a duet with Ronstadt, "If You Have Crying Eyes". Souther contributed as a singer to works written by other artists, including backing vocals with Don Henley; on "The Light Is On" for Christopher Cross on his debut album; on the songs "False Faces" and "Loose Ends" on Dan Fogelberg's 1976 LP Nether Lands; and, with Fogelberg, as the Hot Damn Brothers on Fogelberg's 1975 LP Captured Angel.

Souther co-wrote several songs for the Eagles, including "Best of My Love", "James Dean", "New Kid In Town", and "Doolin-Dalton". The Eagles recording "Heartache Tonight", written by Souther, Bob Seger, Frey, and Henley, was released in 1979 and became the band's final chart-topping song on the Billboard Hot 100. Souther scored his biggest solo hit with the 1979 song "You're Only Lonely" from the album of the same name, which reached number 7 on the Billboard Hot 100 and held the number 1 spot on the Adult Contemporary chart for five consecutive weeks. He was an accomplished performer, and Frey commented that the only reason he was not a bigger solo star was that "he gave the Eagles and Linda Ronstadt most of his best songs".

Souther dated Ronstadt in the 1970s and co-produced her Don't Cry Now album. He also wrote songs for several of her multi-platinum albums, including "Faithless Love" from Heart Like a Wheel and "White Rhythm and Blues" on Living in the USA. He recorded other duets with Ronstadt, including "Prisoner in Disguise", "Sometimes You Can't Win", and "Hearts Against the Wind", which was featured in the 1980 film Urban Cowboy. He collaborated with his friend James Taylor on "Her Town Too" from Taylor's platinum-certified Dad Loves His Work album; it reached number 11 on the Hot 100 and number 5 on the AC chart in 1981.

In 1987 he contributed to, performed on, and arranged the vocals for the Roy Orbison and Friends: A Black and White Night concert and video. That same year he collaborated with Clannad, providing guest vocals for their album Sirius. He sang the show tune "Smoke Gets in Your Eyes" in Steven Spielberg's 1989 film Always, and wrote the theme song to the 1989–92 sitcom Anything But Love. He wrote the song "Wishing on Another Lucky Star", which was featured on the soundtrack of the 1988 movie Permanent Record. He co-wrote Don Henley's 1989 hit song "The Heart of the Matter" and "Doin' Time for Bein' Young", a song performed by James Intveld for the soundtrack of the 1990 Johnny Depp movie Cry-Baby.

At the end of the 1980s, Souther retired from music for more than twenty years "to build a great house and have a life". He returned to recording in 2008 and in October released an album recorded with a jazz band, If the World Was You, his first new studio release in nearly 25 years. He said he had retired from the music industry because it was making him crazy, but "it turns out I was crazy anyway, so I thought I might as well start making records again." He joined the Eagles on their farewell tour in 2008; the band opened the show each night with his 1972 song "How Long", from the Long Road Out Of Eden album.

In the fall of 2009, Souther released a follow-up live album, Rain − Live at the Belcourt Theatre, featuring a blend of old and new material. On May 31, 2011, he released Natural History, featuring new versions of his songs recorded by other artists. On October 9, 2012, he released Midnight in Tokyo, a live EP. On June 14, 2013, Souther was inducted into the Songwriters Hall of Fame. He was described as "a principal architect of the Southern California sound and a major influence on a generation of songwriters."

=== Acting career ===
In 1989, Souther played the character of John Dunaway in the third season of the television drama Thirtysomething. In 1990 he played Ted in the film Postcards from the Edge. He appeared in the audiobook of Jimmy Buffett's A Salty Piece of Land. Souther played Jesse James in the television movie Purgatory in 1999 and Jeffrey Pommeroy in My Girl 2. In 2012, he appeared in the mystery thriller Deadline. He had a recurring role in the first season of the country music drama series Nashville, which premiered in October 2012. He reprised his role in a 2017 episode of the fifth season.

== Personal life and death ==
Souther married Alexandra Sliwin, a member of the group Honey Ltd., in March 1969; they divorced in 1972. He dated Linda Ronstadt and Stevie Nicks in the 1970s. He briefly dated Judee Sill and was the inspiration for her song "Jesus Was a Cross Maker".

In December 2002, Souther moved from the Hollywood Hills to Nashville, Tennessee. In 2004, he married Sarah Nicholson from Bansha, Ireland; they divorced in 2010.

JD Souther died at his home in Sandia Park, New Mexico, on September 17, 2024, at the age of 78. He was due to begin a tour in less than a week with songwriter Karla Bonoff.

== Discography ==
=== Albums ===
Year	Album	Chart positions			Label
Year	Album	US	AUS	CAN	Label
1972	John David Souther	206	—	—	Asylum
1976	Black Rose	85	—	—	Asylum
1979	You're Only Lonely	41	65	68	Columbia
1984	Home by Dawn	203	—	—	Warner Bros.
2008	If the World Was You	—	—	—	Slow Curve
2009	Rain − Live at the Belcourt Theatre	—	—	—	Slow Curve
2011	Natural History	—	—	—	Entertainment One Music
2012	Midnight in Tokyo	—	—	—	Entertainment One Music
2015	Tenderness	—	—	—	Sony Masterworks
2023	Live at the Boarding House, July 7, 1976	—	—	—	Floating World Ltd.
"—" denotes releases that did not chart

=== Singles ===
Year	Single	Peak chart positions							Album
Year	Single	US AC	US	US Country	AUS	CAN AC	CAN	CAN Country	Album
1979	"You're Only Lonely"	1	7	60	17	2	18	12	You're Only Lonely
1980	"White Rhythm and Blues"	46	105	—	—	—	—	—	You're Only Lonely
1980	"If You Don't Want My Love"	—	110 (Note: US Record World Singles Chart)	—	—	—	—	—	You're Only Lonely
1981	"Her Town Too" (with James Taylor)	5	11	—	54	5	19	—	Dad Loves His Work (James Taylor album)
1984	"Go Ahead and Rain"	—	104	—	—	—	—	—	Home by Dawn
"—" denotes releases that did not chart.

=== The Souther–Hillman–Furay Band ===
- The Souther-Hillman-Furay Band (Asylum Records, 1974) US No. 11, Gold, AUS No. 58
- Trouble in Paradise (1975)

== See also ==
- Country rock
