= The Souther–Hillman–Furay Band (album) =

The Souther-Hillman-Furay Band

Studio album by Souther-Hillman-Furay Band
- Released: 1974
- Studio: American Recorders, Los Angeles, California
- Genre: Country rock, soft rock
- Length: 38:42
- Label: Asylum
- Producer: Richard Podolor

Souther-Hillman-Furay Band chronology
The Souther-Hillman-Furay Band (1974)	Trouble in Paradise (1975)

The Souther-Hillman-Furay Band is the debut album by the supergroup Souther-Hillman-Furay Band, released in 1974 on Asylum Records. It peaked at number 11 on the Billboard albums chart.

== History ==
The Souther-Hillman-Furay Band was a country rock supergroup led by singer-songwriters Richie Furay, Chris Hillman, and JD Souther. The band was formed in 1973 upon the request of David Geffen, then head of Asylum Records. The group had a substantial hit with the 1974 self-titled first album and the single "Fallin' in Love" reached No. 27 in the U.S. and No. 32 in Canada. A second single, "Safe at Home", reached just No. 94 in Canada. It was reissued on CD by the Wounded Bird label in 2002.

== Reception ==
Professional ratings
Review scores
Source	Rating
AllMusic	4/5 stars
Christgau's Record Guide	C+
Tom Hull	C

In his review for AllMusic, critic Brett Hartenbach wrote "despite high expectations along with the history of their members, the Souther-Hillman-Furay Band's 1974 eponymous debut never quite lived up to its promise. The trio... delivers a collection of ten pleasant, if overall unremarkable tunes in the singer/songwriter, country-rock vein. There are glimmers of past glories by each, but only Furay really connects solidly... there should be enough here—thanks especially to the Furay tracks—that will at least be of moderate interest to most fans."

== Track listing ==
1. "Fallin' in Love" (Richie Furay) – 3:31
2. "Heavenly Fire" (Len Fagan, Chris Hillman) – 3:46
3. "The Heartbreaker" (JD Souther) – 2:57
4. "Believe Me" (Furay) – 5:03
5. "Border Town" (Souther) – 3:54
6. "Safe at Home" (Hillman) – 2:54
7. "Pretty Goodbyes" (Souther) – 3:43
8. "Rise and Fall" (Fagan, Hillman) – 3:08
9. "The Flight of the Dove" (Furay) – 4:08
10. "Deep, Dark and Dreamless" (Souther) – 5:37

== Personnel ==
- JD Souther - vocals, guitar
- Chris Hillman - vocals, bass, mandolin, guitar
- Richie Furay - vocals, guitar
- Jim Gordon - drums, percussion
- Paul Harris - keyboards
- Joe Lala - percussion on "Border Town" and "Rise and Fall"
- Al Perkins - pedal steel guitar, guitar and bass on "Heavenly Fire"; dobro on "Rise and Fall"

Production notes

- Richard Podolor - producer, mixing
- Elliot Roberts - direction
- Doug Sax - mastering
- Bill Cooper - engineer, mixing
- Jimmy Wachtel - design, artwork
- Amanda Flick - assistant to artwork
- Lorrie Sullivan - photography

== Charts ==
Chart (1974)	Position
Australia (Kent Music Report)	58
Canada (RPM)	41
Billboard Pop albums	11
