= Manhattan, Kansas (song) =

1972 single by Glen Campbell

- German release picture sleeve

Single by Glen Campbell
- B-side: "Wayfarin' Stranger"
- Released: March 6, 1972
- Recorded: February 25, 1972
- Studio: Capitol (Hollywood)
- Genre: Country
- Length: 2:39
- Label: Capitol
- Songwriter: Joe Allen
- Producer: Al DeLory

Glen Campbell singles chronology
"Oklahoma Sunday Morning" (1971)	"Manhattan, Kansas" (1972)	"I Will Never Pass This Way Again" (1972)

"Manhattan, Kansas" is a song written by Joe Allen, and recorded by American country music artist Glen Campbell and released in March 1972 as a single. The song peaked at number 6 on both the U.S. Billboard Hot Country Singles chart and the RPM Country Tracks chart in Canada.

== Content ==
The song's name refers to the city of Manhattan, Kansas, which in the song is the hometown of a young girl who has a baby after being used and abandoned by the baby's father. The song tells of her leaving town (to Denver), and washing dishes to support herself.

== Chart performance ==
Chart (1972)	Peak position
US Hot Country Songs (Billboard)	6
US Bubbling Under Hot 100 (Billboard)	14
Canadian RPM Country Tracks	6

== Other versions of the song ==
- Donna Fargo on her debut number 1 country album The Happiest Girl in the Whole U.S.A. (May 1972)
- Loretta Lynn on her 1972 album Here I Am Again
- Jody Miller on her 1972 album There's a Party Goin' On
- Sammi Smith on her 1974 album The Rainbow in Daddy's Eyes
