= Captured Angel =

Studio album by Dan Fogelberg
- Released: September 1975
- Recorded: 1975
- Genre: Soft rock
- Length: 37:38
- Label: Full Moon/Epic
- Producer: Dan Fogelberg

Dan Fogelberg chronology
Souvenirs (1974)	Captured Angel (1975)	Nether Lands (1977)

Singles from Captured Angel
- 1. "Below the Surface" Released: 1975; 2. "Captured Angel" Released: 1975

Captured Angel is the third album by American singer-songwriter Dan Fogelberg, released in 1975. He promoted the album with a tour in support of Eagles.

The album peaked at No. 23 on the Billboard 200. It has sold more than a million copies. The album was certified platinum by the Recording Industry Association of America on January 22, 1992.

== Production ==
The album was produced by Fogelberg. He alone recorded all of the instrumental parts before being convinced by his label to allow for a few re-recordings and contributions by other musicians. The majority of the album was recorded at a studio in South Pekin, Illinois; Fogelberg had returned home to care for his ill father.

== Critical reception ==
Professional ratings
Review scores
Source	Rating
AllMusic	2/5 stars
Christgau's Record Guide	D+
The Encyclopedia of Popular Music	2/5 stars
MusicHound Rock: The Essential Album Guide	2.5/5 stars
The Rolling Stone Album Guide	2/5 stars

Stereo Review praised Fogelberg's musicianship, but wrote that as a singer "he sounds raw, unsure, and at times even amateurish, particularly when any emotionality is involved."

Cashbox wrote that Fogelberg "has got a set of pipes that are a natural in the area of laidback" and that it is this "singing prowess that pervades the smooth flow of "Captured Angel" as the ease of his interpretation serves only to enhance the laidback of the situation". They singled out "Old Tennessee", "The Last Nail" and "Next Time" as their top listens.

== Track listing ==
All songs were written by Dan Fogelberg.

No.	Title	Length
1.	"Aspen / These Days"	7:39
2.	"Comes and Goes"	2:25
3.	"Captured Angel"	2:57
4.	"Old Tennessee"	3:07
5.	"Next Time"	4:10
6.	"Man in the Mirror / Below the Surface"	7:10
7.	"Crow"	4:40
8.	"The Last Nail"	5:30

== Personnel ==
- Dan Fogelberg – banjo, bass guitar (except on "Captured Angel", "Old Tennessee" and "Next Time"), guitar, harmonica, percussion (except on "Comes and Goes", keyboards, lead and backing vocals, ARP synthesizer
- Hot Damn Brothers – backing vocals on "Next Time"
- Russ Kunkel – drums, percussion on "Comes and Goes"
- David Lindley – fiddle on "Crow"
- Al Perkins – pedal steel guitar on "Next Time"
- Norbert Putnam – bass on "Captured Angel", "Old Tennessee" and "Next Time"
- JD Souther – backing vocals on "Next Time"
- Glen Spreen – string arrangements on "Aspen", "Next Time" and "The Last Nail"

Production

- Producer – Dan Fogelberg
- Engineers – Tom Byler, Jeff Guercio, Terry Jamison, Gary Ladinsky and John Stronach.
- Recorded at Golden Voice Studios (South Pekin, IL); Caribou Ranch (Nederland, CO); Record Plant LA (Los Angeles, CA); Record Plant (Sausalito, CA).
- Mixed by John Stronach at Record Plant (Sausalito, CA).
- Mastered by Rick Collins at Kendun Recorders (Burbank, CA).
- Design – Ron Coro
- Photography – Henry Diltz
- Cover artwork – Dan Fogelberg

== Charts ==
Year	Album Charts	Position
1975	Billboard (North America) Pop Albums	23
1975	Cash Box Top 100 Albums	17

== Certifications ==
Region	Certification	Certified units/sales
United States (RIAA)	Platinum	1,000,000^{^}
^{^} Shipments figures based on certification alone.
