= Trouble in Paradise (Souther-Hillman-Furay Band album) =

Studio album by Souther-Hillman-Furay Band
- Released: 1975
- Studio: Caribou Ranch, Nederland, CO
- Genre: Rock
- Length: 33:29
- Label: Asylum
- Producer: Tom Dowd

Souther-Hillman-Furay Band chronology
The Souther–Hillman–Furay Band (1974)	Trouble in Paradise (1975)

Professional ratings
Review scores
Source	Rating
AllMusic	2.5/5 stars
Christgau's Record Guide	C−

Trouble in Paradise is the second, and final album by the Souther-Hillman-Furay Band, released in 1975 on Asylum Records. It peaked at number 39 on the Billboard albums chart.

== Reception ==
AllMusic's Brett Hartenbach noted the band "seemed to be distancing itself a bit from its country-rock roots with its second release, while at the same time slipping even closer to the middle of the road." Saying that on this album, "J.D. Souther, who penned four of the LP's nine tracks, leads the way, with "Prisoner in Disguise" and "Mexico" and the title cut as the standouts. "Mexico" became a minor hit in Boston. Still, Furay, whose two compositions were dominated by his recent conversion to Christianity, does connect with the lovely "For Someone I Love"… Hillman's trio of selections,… are moderately successful, if in the long run somewhat forgettable." Concluding that "what must have seemed like a great idea in 1973 was showing signs of unraveling. The band was finished by 1976 following Trouble in Paradise's poor showing."

Rolling Stone's Bud Scoppa was scathing. Though allowing "the few moments of life contained on Trouble in Paradise are Souther's doing." He described Hillman's contributions as "three more variations of the same tuneless, unchanging song." Concluding "[w]hy don't SHF redeem themselves while they still can and just forget the whole thing."

== Track listing ==
1. "Trouble in Paradise" (JD Souther) – 5:05
2. "Move Me Real Slow" (Chris Hillman) – 3:03
3. "For Someone I Love" (Richie Furay) – 2:56
4. "Mexico" (Souther) – 3:14
5. "Love and Satisfy" (Hillman) – 2:59
6. "On the Line" (Furay) – 3:40
7. "Prisoner in Disguise" (Souther) – 4:52
8. "Follow Me Through" (Hillman) – 3:50
9. "Somebody Must Be Wrong" (Souther) – 3:50

== Charts ==
Chart (1975)	Position
Australia (Kent Music Report)	100

== Personnel ==
- JD Souther - vocals, guitar, drums on "Trouble in Paradise" and "Love and Satisfy", bass on "Move Me Real Slow"
- Chris Hillman - vocals, bass, mandolin, guitar
- Richie Furay - vocals, guitar
- Al Perkins - lead guitar, pedal steel guitar, dobro
- Paul Harris - keyboards, flute
- Joe Lala - percussion
- Ron Grinel – drums
- James William Guercio – "Southside" guitar on "Trouble in Paradise"
- Glenn Frey, Don Henley, JD Souther, The Sons of the Desert – backing vocals on "Somebody Must Be Wrong"

Production notes

- Tom Dowd - producer
- Jeff Guercio – engineer
- Mark Guercio – assistant engineer
- Elliot Roberts, Ron Stone - direction
- Jimmy Wachtel - design
- Lorrie Sullivan - photography
