= Faithless Love =

Song by J.D. Souther

Song by Linda Ronstadt

from the album Heart Like a Wheel
- Released: November 1974
- Length: 3:15
- Label: Capitol
- Songwriter: JD Souther
- Producer: Peter Asher

"Faithless Love"

Single by Glen Campbell

from the album Letter to Home
- B-side: "Scene of the Crime"
- Released: June 11, 1984
- Recorded: March–April 1984
- Studio: The Music Mill, Nashville, Tennessee
- Genre: Country
- Length: 3:17
- Label: Atlantic
- Songwriter: JD Souther
- Producer: Harold Shedd

Glen Campbell singles chronology
"Letting Go" (1983)	"Faithless Love" (1984)	"Slow Nights" (1984)

"Faithless Love" is a song written by JD Souther and first recorded and released by Linda Ronstadt on her 1974 album Heart Like a Wheel. Souther's recording appears on his 1976 album Black Rose.

American country music artist Glen Campbell's version of the song was released in June 1984 as the lead single from the album Letter to Home. The song reached #10 on the Billboard Hot Country Singles & Tracks chart.

== Chart performance ==
Chart (1984)	Peak position
US Hot Country Songs (Billboard)	10
Canadian RPM Country Tracks	16
