= A Salty Piece of Land =

Book by Jimmy Buffett

- Author: Jimmy Buffett
- Publisher: Little, Brown and Company
- Publication date: November 30, 2004
- Media type: Hardcover
- Pages: 462
- ISBN: 978-0-316-90845-0
- OCLC: 30029025
- Dewey Decimal: 813/.54 22
- LC Class: PS3552.U375 S25 2004

A Salty Piece of Land is a 2004 novel by bestselling author and songwriter Jimmy Buffett. It is about a fictional American westerner, Tully Mars, who goes to work repairing an island lighthouse. Buffett first introduced the character Tully Mars in his earlier work, Tales from Margaritaville. The book includes a CD single with a song of the same title as the book.

== Synopsis ==
Tully Mars, a 40-something guide at the Lost Boys Fishing Lodge resort, takes trips around the Caribbean and is also put in charge of fixing an old lighthouse.

In this novel Buffett connects stories of science fiction (Captain Kirk), fantasy (The Lost Boys), and drama (Clark Gable) into a single Caribbean-themed epic.

== Plot details ==
This book picks up where the story Take Another Road from the anthology Tales from Margaritaville left off. Tully Mars breaks up with his girlfriend, Donna Kay, a waitress from the Chat 'N' Chew restaurant in Heat Wave, Alabama. In the previous story, he sent her a winning lottery ticket and asked her to meet him in Belize City, a date which he failed to keep.

He sails with Captain Kirk, the captain of a shrimp boat, to a mythical place known as Punta Margarita, where he becomes a fishing guide at a local resort, The Lost Boys, named after characters in Peter Pan (a lost childhood is a common theme among Buffett works). He begins to settle into a life of leisure, fishing and drinking with his Mayan friend Ix-Nay, but his world is soon turned completely upside down when Donna Kay shows up on a pink seaplane and tells him that she will marry Clark Gable, a master horse trainer featured in the previous story.

He leaves Lost Boys to take a few days off after this experience, and drunkenly falls asleep on the beach, where he is robbed in his sleep. When he wakes, a 140-foot schooner, the Lucretia, is anchored nearby. When the captain, feisty 101-year-old Cleopatra Highbourne, comes ashore, they strike up a friendship immediately and Tully is offered a job as part of the crew. Initially, he turns down this offer, but after run-ins with two bounty hunters from Wyoming, where he has outstanding warrants, he finds himself on her ship just the same. It is at that point that she takes him to Cayo Loco, the salty piece of land referred to in the book's title, which is a small mythical island that is home to an old-fashioned lighthouse. Cleopatra puts Tully to work fixing up the ruin, as she intends the island to be her final resting place.
