= If the World Was You =

Studio album by JD Souther
- Released: October 14, 2008
- Genre: Country rock
- Label: Slow Curve
- Producer: JD Souther

JD Souther chronology
Home by Dawn (1984)	If the World Was You (2008)	Natural History (2011)

Professional ratings
Review scores
Source	Rating
Allmusic	link

If the World Was You is an album by JD Souther, released in 2008. It was his first studio release in 24 years, recorded live with a five-piece jazz ensemble.

== Track listing ==
All the songs written by JD Souther.

1. "I'll Be Here at Closing Time" – 3:38
2. "House of Pride" – 3:16
3. "Journey Down the Nile" – 4:46
4. "One More Night (Killing Spree)" – 4:18
5. "In My Arms Tonight" – 4:22
6. "Rain" – 5:03
7. "A Chorus of Your Own" – 6:19
8. "The Border Guard" – 4:26
9. "Brown (Osaka Story)" – 5:49
10. "Come On Up" – 4:20
11. "The Secret Handshake of Fate" – 12:56
12. "On The Day Nobody Likes You" - 5:55 (bonus track for Japan -- appears as track 11, preceding "The Secret Handshake of Fate")

== Personnel ==
- John David Souther – vocals, guitar, sax
- Béla Fleck – banjo
- Jeff Coffin – flute, saxophone
- Marie Vanel Borderon Choir – chorus
- Sylvia Elana Garcia Choir – chorus, soloist
- Dan Immel – bass
- Marisol LaBoy Choir – chorus
- Jim Mayer – bass
- Rod McGaha – trumpet
- Chris Walters – piano
- Jim White – drums, percussion

Production notes

- John David Souther – producer
- Jim White – digital editing
- Erick Anderson – portraits
- Richie Biggs – digital editing, mixing
- Niko Bolas – engineer, mixing
- Ernest Chapman – photography
- Jim McGuire – photography, cover portrait
- John Netti – engineer
- Mark Petaccia – engineer
- David Robinson – engineer
- Ron Stone – management
- Edward O'Day – management
- Richard Dodd – mastering
- Cheryl Gibson – photography
- Jordan Brooke Hamlin – layout design, packaging, cover graphics
