= TTG Studios =

Recording studio in Los Angeles, California

Coordinates: 34.0973°N 118.3380°W

- Type: Recording studio
- Founded: June 8, 1965; 61 years ago
- Founders: Amnon "Ami" Hadani; Tom Hidley
- Headquarters: Hollywood, California, United States
- Products: Music recording

TTG Studios is a recording studio in Los Angeles, California, co-founded in 1965 by recording engineers Tom Hidley and Amnon "Ami" Hadani.

TTG apparently stands for “Two Terrible Guys”

== History ==
The studio is located in the Hollywood section of Los Angeles, near the intersection of Sunset Boulevard and Highland Avenue. Originally the home of the Hollywood Knights of Columbus, the building was built in 1927, an active period in Hollywood, as nearby buildings Grauman's Chinese Theatre, the Hollywood Roosevelt Hotel and the Hollywood Athletic Club all date from the same period. In 1960, Radio Recorders converted the ground floor billiards room and half the lounge into a recording studio to form their Sunset-Highland Division (Studio 10H), which had formerly housed the Blue Network and other entertainment-related companies.

TTG was co-founded by Tom Hidley and Amnon "Ami" Hadani, who had both previously worked for Phil Ramone at A & R Recording in New York before relocating to Los Angeles in 1965 to found TTG. TTG converted the second story main hall into a large recording studio that could accommodate up to 100 musicians. Meticulously and innovatively designed by Hidley with a high decibel level threshold, the studio became popular with the up-and-coming rock musicians of that time, including The Monkees, Eric Burdon, Frank Zappa and The Mothers of Invention, and Alice Cooper. Burdon introduced Jimi Hendrix to the studio and Hendrix "raved" about the studio's sound.

TTG installed one of the first 16-track tape recorders, which was custom built by co-owner Hidley, at a time when 4- or 8-track recording was still the norm. Jimi Hendrix used this machine at TTG in October 1968.

== Personnel ==
=== Tom Hidley ===
TTG Studios' co-founder was Tom Hidley. He was born May 27, 1931, in Los Angeles, California. As a teen, he spent long hours playing the saxophone, clarinet, and flute, until ordered to cease by his physician after a physical breakdown. He then turned to non-performance aspects of music, and spent nights recording at clubs and days working at loudspeaker and tape-machine companies.

In 1959, "Madman Muntz" hired Hidley to assist in the development of the first car stereo. Among the first to own a Muntz car stereo was Frank Sinatra, the famous singer and actor. Through Sinatra's purchase, Hidley became known to a Sinatra associate Val Valentin, who invited Hildley to assist in the building of a new recording studio in New York. In 1962, they built the MGM/Verve studio. In 1964, Phil Ramone hired Hidley to work at his A&R studio as the audio technical manager. Also employed at that time by A&R was Ami Hadani. Hidley went on to found Westlake Recording Studios in the 1970s, a facility which was highly influential in standardizing acoustic design in the recording industry and which has been used by a large number of prominent vocal artists.

=== Ami Hadani ===
TTG co-founder Amnon "Ami" Hadani was born August 19, 1929. He was credited as Omi Hadan on some records. Hadani's association with MGM/Verve artists preceded TTG and his work with rock groups. He engineered albums by jazzmen Ray Brown and Milt Jackson, actress Lainie Kazan, and location recording for standup comic Shelley Berman.

Ami Hadani was married to actress/screenwriter Ellen Weston and they had one child, Jonathan Hadani (Jon Weston), also a Sound Engineer and Theatrical Sound Designer. They were divorced when their son was six years old. Ami remarried Christine Ermacoff, a studio cellist. Ami Hadani died on September 22, 2014, in Los Angeles.

== Albums recorded at TTG Studios ==
Album	Artist	Release date
Popsicle	Jan and Dean	March 1966
Filet of Soul (album)	Jan and Dean	March 1966
The Golden Sword	Gerald Wilson	1966
Freak Out!	The Mothers of Invention	June 27, 1966
Animalism	The Animals	November, 1966
Songs for Rainy Day Lovers	Clare Fischer	1967 (reissued in 1978 as America the Beautiful)
Winds of Change	Eric Burdon and The Animals	September, 1967
Early Morning Blues and Greens	Diane Hildebrand	June, 1967
Goodbye and Hello (Tim Buckley album)	Tim Buckley	August, 1967
Big Boss Bones	Trombones Unlimited	June, 1967
Absolutely Free	The Mothers of Invention	May 26, 1967
The Velvet Underground & Nico	The Velvet Underground & Nico	March 12, 1967
The Love Generation	The Love Generation	July, 1967
Love Is	Eric Burdon & The Animals	December, 1968
Mirror Man	Captain Beefheart	April, 1971
Basie Straight Ahead	Count Basie	January, 1968
A Generation of Love	The Love Generation	January, 1968
Those Were the Days	Ernie Heckscher	March, 1968
The Sound of the Seventies	Tommy Vig Orchestra	July, 1968
Patterns of Reality	Andy Robinson	August, 1968
Hal Frazier	Hal Frazier	November, 1968
Waiting for the Sun	The Doors	July 3, 1968
The Jimi Hendrix Experience (archival recordings)	Jimi Hendrix	October 29, 1968 (released September 12, 2000 )
West Coast Seattle Boy: The Jimi Hendrix Anthology (archival recordings)	Jimi Hendrix	October 20, 21 and 23, 1968 (released November 16, 2010)
TTG Studios October 1968 (unauthorized)	Jimi Hendrix	October 1968
Peace in Mississippi (First Rays of The Rising Sun Album)	Jimi Hendrix	October 24, 1968
Red House (song)	Jimi Hendrix	October 29, 1968
Hand Sown ... Home Grown	Linda Ronstadt	March, 1969
"Yes I Need Someone" / "Let Me Stay" (Buddah Records single, circa September 1968)	Eire Apparent	August 26, 1968
Follow Me (Original Soundtrack Album)	Stu Phillips	May, 1969
Sun Rise (featuring Jimi Hendrix)	Eire Apparent	December, 1968
The Association	The Association	August, 1969
Hot Rats	Frank Zappa	October 10, 1969
The Velvet Underground (album)	The Velvet Underground	March 1969
Neil Young	Neil Young	November 12, 1968
Right On	Phil Moore Jr.	December, 1968
A.B. Skhy	A.B. Skhy	December, 1968
Crow by Crow	Crow	February, 1970
Lover Man	Jimi Hendrix	March 23, 1970
Longbranch Pennywhistle	Longbranch Pennywhistle	April, 1970
So Young (Love Theme From "Zabriskie Point")	Roy Orbison	March 18, 1970
Sweet Gingerbread Man	The Mike Curb Congregation	April 3, 1970
I Call Your Name (from the MGM film "Zigzag" Soundtrack)	Bobby Hatfield	April 3, 1970
All You Did Was Smile (from the MGM film "Zigzag" Soundtrack)	Bobby Hatfield	April 3, 1970
Copperfields	The Dillards	May, 1970
Take It and Smile	Eve	June, 1970
Our Front Porch	Ralph Carmichael and the Young People	July, 1970
Weasels Ripped My Flesh	The Mothers of Invention	August, 1970
Theme From "Medical Center"	Lalo Schifrin	September 18, 1970
Spill the Wine	Lalo Schifrin	September 18, 1970
Chunga's Revenge	Frank Zappa	October, 1970
Sunday's Child	Sunday's Child	October, 1970
Slow Down	Crow	January, 1971
The Last Time I Saw Her	Glen Campbell	July, 1971
Rainbow Bridge	Jimi Hendrix	August, 1971
I'm Gon' Git Myself Together	Jimmy Smith	October, 1971
Reformation	The California Earthquake	November, 1971
Sailin' Shoes	Little Feat	February, 1972
Let Love Live	Jeremiah People	October, 1972
Doing What Comes Naturally	Charles Wright	January, 1973
Sonlight	Sonlight	March, 1973
Vital Blue	Blue Mitchell	June, 1973
Beginning Today	The Dameans	1973
Killing Me Softly	Ferrante & Teicher	September, 1973
The Waltons' Christmas Album	The Holiday Singers	January, 1974
Dino Plays Folk Musical Themes	Dino with the Ralph Carmichael Orchestra and Chorus	March, 1974
The Entertainer	Marvin Hamlisch	May, 1974
...Beautiful...Beautiful	Ferrante & Teicher	August, 1974
Tommy Butler	Tommy Butler	December, 1974
Fly On	Air Pocket	February, 1975
A Southern Memoir	Bing Crosby	April, 1975
Tales of a Courtesan (Oirantan)	Toshiko Akiyoshi – Lew Tabackin Big Band	January, 1976
Inside America	Juggy Murray Jones	April, 1976
Concert in Blues	Willie Hutch	October, 1976
We Have This Moment...Today	Richard Roberts and Patti Roberts	December, 1976
Bahiana	Dizzy Gillespie	February, 1977
A Retrospective	Linda Ronstadt	June, 1977
'Twas Only Yesterday	March, 1979	
Duality	Clare Fischer	June, 1980
Straight Ahead	Poncho Sanchez	August, 1980
I Lead a Charmed Life	Russell Garcia	September, 1980
Carl Burnett Quintet Plays Music of Richard Rodgers Vol. 1	Carl Burnett Quintet	November, 1980
Turning to Spring	Howard Roberts	January, 1981
Road Work Ahead	Bob Magnusson featuring Peter Sprague, Bill Mays, and Jim Plank	February, 1981
Westlake	Bob Florence	March, 1981
Lomelin	Gerald Wilson	April, 1981
Jazz Quintet	Robert Conti feat. Mike Wofford	April, 1981
Hoy-Hoy!	Little Feat	October, 1981
Two Generations of Music	Bob Magnusson featuring Daniel Magnusson	June, 1982
Summer Strut	Andy Simpkins	July, 1984
Nothing’s About to Happen to Me	Mitski	February, 2026
Stove	Lana Del Rey	TBA
