= Longbranch Pennywhistle =

American country rock/folk music group

Longbranch Pennywhistle was a country rock and folk music group featuring Glenn Frey and JD Souther. They originally performed as "John David & Glenn", but when they added bass player David Jackson, they were encouraged to come up with a new name. Frey suggested "Longbranch", Souther came up with "Pennywhistle", and the names were merged at the suggestion of manager Doug Weston. They released a self-titled album in 1969 under Jimmy Bowen's Amos Records label. Frey had made the migration from Detroit to California and Souther from Amarillo, Texas and were adapting to what would become the California sound. When the Amos Records label dissolved in 1971 the group had already disbanded the year prior.

Frey went on to co-found the Eagles and Souther wrote or co-wrote several of the Eagles' most popular songs, along with hits for Linda Ronstadt. He also recorded a number of hits under his own name, including "Her Town Too" which was a major hit in a duet with James Taylor. He also was a third of the Souther-Hillman-Furay Band.

On March 16, 2018, it was announced that the band's album has been remixed and remastered and would be reissued as part of the Frey greatest hits collection Above the Clouds on May 11, 2018. A standalone CD and vinyl record was released on September 28, 2018.

Frey died in 2016; Souther died in 2024.
