= You're Only Lonely (song) =

Single by JD Souther

from the album You're Only Lonely
- B-side: "Songs of Love"
- Released: August 1979
- Genre: Soft rock; country rock
- Length: 3:48
- Label: Columbia
- Songwriter: JD Souther

JD Souther singles chronology
"You're Only Lonely" (1979)	"White Rhythm and Blues" (1980)

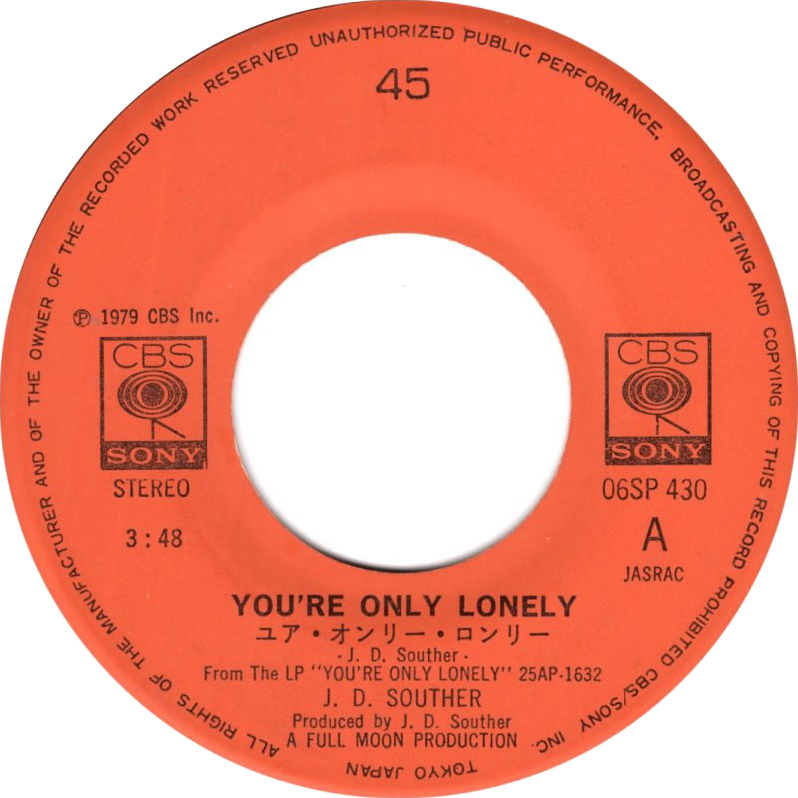
A-side label of the Japanese single release

"You're Only Lonely" is a 1979 single by American singer-songwriter JD Souther from his third studio album You're Only Lonely. It was Souther's only top ten pop hit, peaking at number seven on the Billboard Hot 100 for the weeks of December 15, 22 and 29, 1979 and spent five weeks at number one on the Adult Contemporary chart.

== Background ==
Souther hired Danny Kortchmar to play guitar, David Sanborn saxophone, and to help out with the harmony, Phil Everly, Jackson Browne, and three members of the Eagles (Glenn Frey, Don Felder, Don Henley).

== Charts ==
Chart (1979–80)	Peak position
Australia (Kent Music Report)	17
Canadian RPM Top Singles	18
Canadian RPM Adult Contemporary	2
Canadian RPM Country Tracks	12
U.S. Billboard Hot 100	7
U.S. Billboard Adult Contemporary	1
U.S. Billboard Hot Country Singles	60

Year-end chart (1980)	Rank
US Top Pop Singles (Billboard)	57

== Cover versions ==
- The song was covered by Marietta, then wife of Rick Parfitt, as a single in 1982.
- It was covered in 2004 by Taiwanese girl group S.H.E on their album Magical Journey.
- It was covered by singer-songwriter Schuyler Fisk on her album The Good Stuff.
- Patrick Norman covered the song in French as "Je serai toujours là".
- It was also covered by Raul Malo of the Mavericks, on his 2006 album You're Only Lonely.
- It was covered by Brothers of the Heart.

== In popular culture ==
- The song was featured in the 2005 Korean film Daddy-Long-Legs and the 2013 Korean drama, A Little Love Never Hurts.

== See also ==
- List of number-one adult contemporary singles of 1979 (U.S.)
