= Souther–Hillman–Furay Band =

1970s Country-rock supergroup formed by ex-members of Buffalo Springfield and the Byrds

- Also known as: SHF
- Origin: Los Angeles, California, U.S.
- Genres: Country rock; soft rock
- Years active: 1973–1976
- Label: Asylum
- Spinoff of: Buffalo Springfield; Manassas; Poco; The Byrds; The Flying Burrito Brothers
- Past members: JD Souther; Chris Hillman; Richie Furay; Paul Harris; Al Perkins; Joe Lala; Jim Gordon (1973–74); Ron Grinel (1975–76)

The Souther–Hillman–Furay Band (SHF) was a country rock supergroup led by singer-songwriters Richie Furay (Buffalo Springfield, Poco), Chris Hillman (the Byrds, the Flying Burrito Brothers, Manassas, and later Desert Rose Band), and JD Souther (Longbranch Pennywhistle, noted songwriter for Linda Ronstadt and the Eagles). The band recorded two albums during the mid-1970s before breaking up due to disagreements and personality conflicts between the members.

== History ==
The band was formed in 1973 at the suggestion of David Geffen, then head of Asylum Records. Hillman brought three other former members of Manassas to the group: keyboardist/flutist Paul Harris, percussionist Joe Lala, both of whom had also worked with Barnstorm; and pedal steel guitarist Al Perkins, who had also played with the Flying Burrito Brothers. The septet was rounded out by Jim Gordon, a noted session drummer and former member of Derek and the Dominos and Traffic.

The band had a substantial hit in 1974 with its self-titled first album, which was certified gold, and the single "Fallin' in Love" (US #27). However, during the recording of that album, and influenced by Perkins, Furay converted to evangelical Christianity. Tensions among the members increased, and Gordon, who may have been experiencing the onset of schizophrenia, left the band and was replaced by Ron Grinel. In the midst of this chaos, SHF's 1975 album Trouble in Paradise was not critically well received. Soon after, the group disbanded and its namesake members continued on their solo careers.

== Discography ==
=== Albums ===
- The Souther-Hillman-Furay Band (1974), Asylum - US #11, AUS #58
- Trouble in Paradise (1975), originally on Asylum Records, now available on Line Records - US #39, AUS #100

=== Singles ===
- "Fallin' in Love" (1974), Asylum - US #27
- "Safe at Home" / "Border Town" (1974) - US Cash Box #80
- "For Someone I Love" / "Move Me Real Slow" (1975)
- "Mexico" / "Move Me Real Slow" (1975)
- "Trouble in Paradise" (1975)

== Members ==
- JD Souther - vocals, guitar, drums
- Chris Hillman - vocals, bass, mandolin
- Richie Furay - vocals, guitar
- Paul Harris - keyboards, flute
- Al Perkins - guitar, pedal steel, dobro
- Joe Lala - percussion
- Jim Gordon - drums (1973–74)
- Ron Grinel - drums (1975–76)
