= Pixie Lott discography =

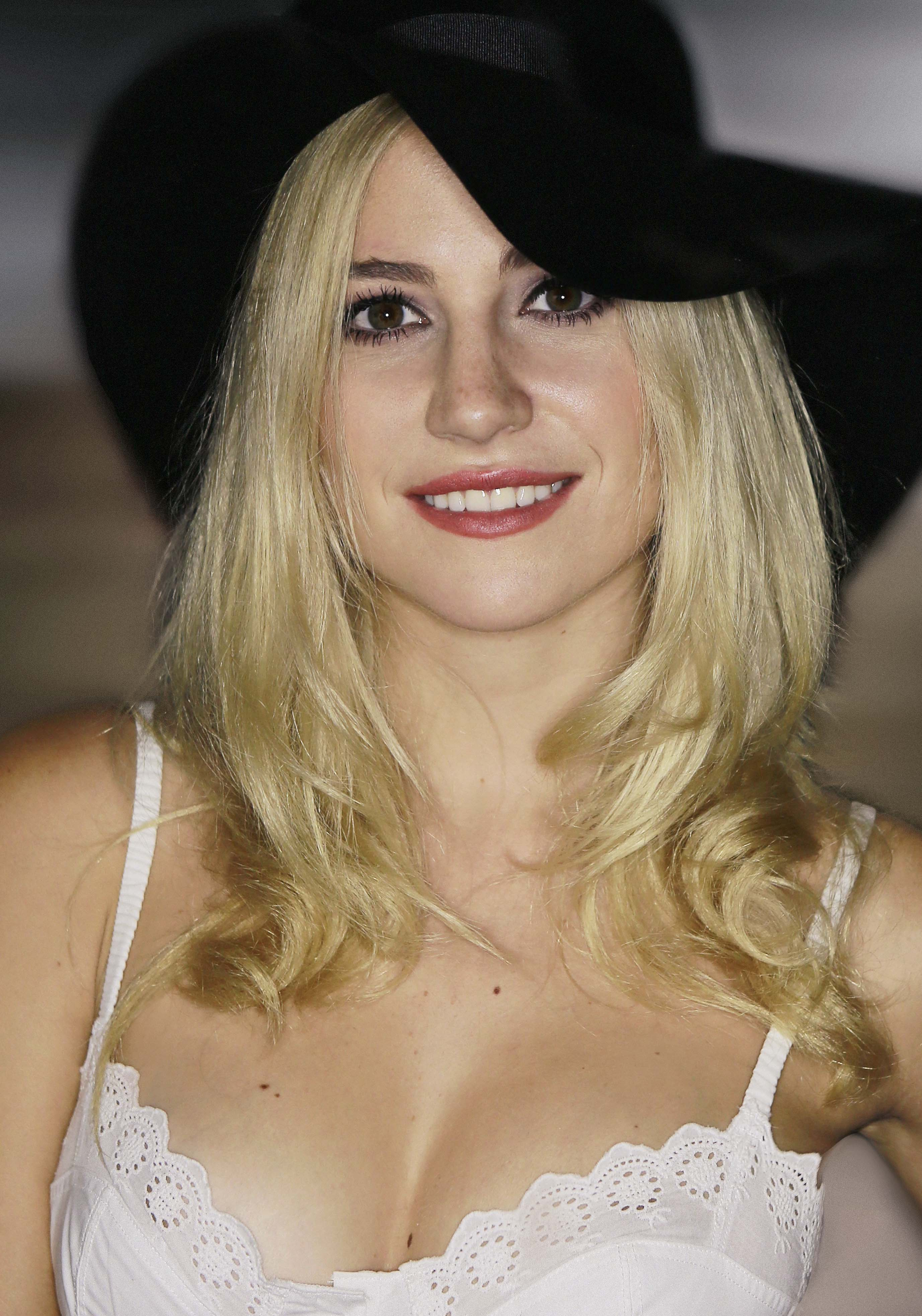
- Lott in September 2014
- Studio albums: 4
- Extended plays: 2
- Compilation albums: 1
- Singles: 18
- Music videos: 26
- Promotional singles: 8

English singer Pixie Lott has released four studio albums, one compilation album, two extended plays, 18 singles (including five as a featured artist), eight promotional singles and 26 music videos. Lott's debut studio album, Turn It Up, was released in September 2009 by Mercury Records. It peaked at number six on the UK Albums Chart and has been certified double Platinum by the British Phonographic Industry (BPI). The album spawned the UK number-one singles "Mama Do (Uh Oh, Uh Oh)" and "Boys and Girls", alongside the top-20 entries "Cry Me Out", "Gravity" and "Turn It Up". Later reissued as Turn It Up Louder in October 2010, the record encompassed "Broken Arrow", which peaked at number 12 on the UK chart.

Lott's second studio album, Young Foolish Happy, was released in November 2011, reaching number 18 in the United Kingdom. Its lead single, "All About Tonight", became the singer's third number one on the UK Singles Chart, while subsequent singles "What Do You Take Me For" and "Kiss the Stars" both reached the top 10 in the territory. In August 2014, Lott released her eponymous third studio album, which charted at number 15 in the UK.

== Albums ==
=== Studio albums ===
List of studio albums, with selected chart positions, sales figures and certifications
Title	Details	Peak chart positions										Sales	Certifications
Title	Details	UK	AUT	BEL (FL)	DEN	FRA	GER	IRE	NL	NZ	SWI	Sales	Certifications
Turn It Up	Released: 11 September 2009; Label: Mercury; Formats: CD, digital download	6	70	99	16	60	81	18	92	30	49	UK: 874,038	BPI: 3× Platinum
Young Foolish Happy	Released: 11 November 2011; Label: Mercury; Formats: CD, digital download	18	—	—	—	—	—	33	—	—	—	UK: 102,888	BPI: Gold
Pixie Lott	Released: 1 August 2014; Label: Virgin EMI; Formats: CD, digital download	15	—	—	—	—	—	100	—	—	—	UK: 4,829	
Encino	Released: 27 September 2024; Label: BMG; Formats: CD, digital download, streaming	— (Note: "Encino" did not enter the Official UK Albums Chart, but peaked at number 9 on the UK Album Downloads chart on October 4, 2024.)	—	—	—	—	—	—	—	—	—		
"—" denotes a recording that did not chart or was not released in that territory.

=== Compilation albums ===
List of compilation albums, with selected chart positions
Title	Details	Peaks
Title	Details	UK
Platinum Pixie: Hits	Released: 21 November 2014; Label: Virgin EMI; Formats: CD, digital download	107

== Extended plays ==
Title	Details
iTunes Live from London	Released: 7 September 2009; Label: Mercury; Format: Digital download
iTunes Festival: London 2010	Released: 28 July 2010; Label: Mercury; Format: Digital download

== Singles ==
=== As lead artist ===
List of singles as lead artist, with selected chart positions and certifications, showing year released and album name
Title	Year	Peak chart positions										Certifications	Album
Title	Year	UK	AUS	BEL (FL)	DEN	FRA	GER	IRE	NL	NZ	SWI	Certifications	Album
"Mama Do (Uh Oh, Uh Oh)"	2009	1	55	22	8	10	30	13	15	19	34	BPI: Gold	Turn It Up
"Boys and Girls"	2009	1	67	— (Note: "Boys and Girls" did not enter the Ultratop 50, but peaked at number three on the Flemish Ultratip chart.)	39	—	—	4	—	—	—	BPI: Gold	Turn It Up
"Cry Me Out"	2009	12	—	—	4	—	—	31	—	—	66	BPI: Gold	Turn It Up
"Gravity"	2010	20	—	—	—	—	—	42	—	—	—		Turn It Up
"Turn It Up"	2010	11	—	—	—	—	—	20	—	—	—	BPI: Silver	Turn It Up
"Broken Arrow"	2010	12	—	—	—	—	—	30	—	—	—		Turn It Up
"All About Tonight"	2011	1	—	—	—	—	—	9	—	—	—	BPI: Platinum	Young Foolish Happy
"What Do You Take Me For?" (featuring Pusha T)	2011	10	—	—	—	—	—	30	—	—	—		Young Foolish Happy
"Kiss the Stars"	2012	8	—	—	—	—	—	33	—	—	—	BPI: Silver	Young Foolish Happy
"Nasty"	2014	9	—	—	—	—	—	43	—	—	—		Pixie Lott
"Lay Me Down"	2014	114	—	—	—	—	—	—	—	—	—		Pixie Lott
"Caravan of Love"	2014	129	—	—	—	—	—	—	—	—	—		Platinum Pixie: Hits
"Baby" (with Anton Powers)	2017	97	—	—	—	—	—	—	—	—	—	BPI: Silver	Non-album singles
"Won't Forget You" (featuring Stylo G)	2017	—	—	—	—	—	—	—	—	—	—		Non-album singles
"Somebody's Daughter"	2024	—	—	—	—	—	—	—	—	—	—		Encino
"Midnight Trash"	2024	—	—	—	—	—	—	—	—	—	—		Encino
"Show You Love"	2024	—	—	—	—	—	—	—	—	—	—		Encino
"Coming of Age"	2025	—	—	—	—	—	—	—	—	—	—		TBA
"First Christmas"	2025	—	—	—	—	—	—	—	—	—	—		Non-album single
"Good Wife"	2026	—	—	—	—	—	—	—	—	—	—		TBA
"Dance Like No One's Watching"	2026	—	—	—	—	—	—	—	—	—	—		TBA
"To My Bones"	2026	—	—	—	—	—	—	—	—	—	—		TBA
"—" denotes a recording that did not chart or was not released in that territory.

=== As featured artist ===
List of singles as featured artist, with selected chart positions, showing year released and album name
Title	Year	Peaks		Album
Title	Year	UK	IRE	Album
"I Got Soul" (as part of Young Soul Rebels)	2009	10	19	Non-album singles
"Bright Lights" (Tinchy Stryder featuring Pixie Lott)	2012	7	19	Non-album singles
"Wild Heart" (The Vamps featuring Pixie Lott)	2014	—	—	Non-album singles
"Bridge over Troubled Water" (as part of Artists for Grenfell)	2017	1	25	Non-album singles
"Safe" (Gabriel-Kane featuring Pixie Lott)	2021	—	—	Non-album singles
"—" denotes a recording that did not chart or was not released in that territory.

=== Promotional singles ===
Title	Year	Album
"Heart Cry"	2014	Pixie Lott
"Moon River"	2016	Non-album promotional singles
"Best Day of My Life"	2016	Non-album promotional singles
"On Top of the World" (with Jennifer Hudson, Luan Santana, Yemi Alade and Monali Thakur)	2018	Non-album promotional singles
"What's Love Got to Do with It"	2019	Non-album promotional singles
"Sunflower"	2019	Non-album promotional singles
"Fake"	2019	Non-album promotional singles
"Ooh La La" (Note: "Ooh La La" appears in the film Greed, but no soundtrack album was released for the film.)	2020	Non-album promotional singles

== Other charted songs ==
List of other charted songs, with selected chart positions, showing year released and album name
Title	Year	Peaks		Album
Title	Year	UK	IRE	Album
"Use Somebody"	2009	41	19	Turn It Up
"Coming Home" (featuring Jason Derulo)	2010	51	—	Turn It Up Louder
"Doing Fine (Without You)"	2010	179	—	Turn It Up Louder
"—" denotes a recording that did not chart or was not released in that territory.

== Guest appearances ==
List of non-single guest appearances, with other performing artists, showing year released and album name
Title	Year	Other artist(s)	Album
"Sufrirás"	2009	David Bisbal	Sin Mirar Atrás (deluxe edition)
"Live for the Moment"	2010	None	StreetDance 3D
"The One"	2010	Stan Walker	From the Inside Out
"We Own the Night"	2011	Selena Gomez & the Scene	When the Sun Goes Down
"Angel"	2012	Lionel Richie	Tuskegee (international edition)
"Charity Song"	2012	Chris Moyles, Gary Barlow, James Corden, Davina McCall, Olly Murs, Danny O'Donoghue, Ed Sheeran, Robbie Williams and Ricky Wilson	The Difficult Second Album

== Songwriting credits ==
List of songs written or co-written by Lott for other artists, showing year released and album name
Title	Year	Artist	Album
"Lonely"	2009	Natalia	Wise Girl
"Mind, Body & Soul"	2009	Natalia	Wise Girl
"You Broke My Heart"	2009	Alexandra Burke	Overcome
"Goodnight, Goodbye"	2009	Leki & the Sweet Mints	Leki and the Sweet Mints
"No Good for Me"	2009	Lisa Lois	Smoke
"Promises, Promises"	2009	Lisa Lois	Smoke
"Lonely"	2010	Anna Altieri	Amici 9
"You Took My Love"	2010	John Farnham	Jack
"Side Effects"	2012	Mandy Capristo	Grace
"Baby Maybe"	2013	Girls' Generation	I Got a Boy
"Sweet Kisses"	2014	Namie Amuro	"Brighter Day" (single)
"City Burns"	2015	Andra Day	Cheers to the Fall

== Music videos ==
List of music videos, showing year released and directors
Title	Year	Director(s)	Ref.
"Mama Do (Uh Oh, Uh Oh)"	2009	Trudy Bellinger	
"Boys and Girls"	2009	Diane Martel	
"I Got Soul" (as part of Young Soul Rebels)	2009	Chris Cowey	
"Cry Me Out"	2009	Jake Nava	
"Gravity"	2010	Nick Frew	
"Turn It Up"	2010	Nick Frew	
"Broken Arrow"	2010	Gregg Masuak	
"Can't Make This Over"	2010	Elisha Smith-Leverock	
"All About Tonight"	2011	Marc Klasfeld	
"What Do You Take Me For?" (featuring Pusha T)	2011	Declan Whitebloom	
"Bright Lights" (Tinchy Stryder featuring Pixie Lott)	2012	Dale Resteghini	
"Kiss the Stars"	2012	Julian Gibbs	
"I Love Your Smile"	2012	Unknown	
"Heart Cry"	2013	Ben Falk	
"Nasty"	2014	Bryan Barber	
"Wild Heart" (The Vamps featuring Pixie Lott)	2014	Dean Sherwood	
"Lay Me Down"	2014	Ben Falk	
"Break Up Song"	2014	Nick Bartlett	
"Caravan of Love"	2014	Ben Jones	
"A Real Good Thing" (featuring Shaggy)	2016	Unknown	
"Best Day of My Life" (with Jennifer Hudson, Steve Aoki, Luan Santana, Yemi Alade and Tan Weiwei)	2016	Paul Trillo	
"Best Day of My Life" (solo)	2016	Unknown	
"Baby" (with Anton Powers)	2017	Francis Wallis	
"Baby" (acoustic version) (with Anton Powers)	2017	Francis Wallis	
"Won't Forget You" (featuring Stylo G)	2017	Phillip Killingbeck	
"On Top of the World" (with Jennifer Hudson, Luan Santana, Yemi Alade and Monali Thakur)	2017	Unknown	
