= Platinum Pixie: Hits =

Greatest hits album by Pixie Lott
- Released: 21 November 2014
- Recorded: 2009–2014
- Length: 51.30
- Label: Virgin EMI

Pixie Lott chronology
Pixie Lott (2014)	Platinum Pixie: Hits (2014)	Encino (2024)

Singles from Platinum Pixie: Hits
- 1. "Caravan of Love" Released: 31 October 2014

Platinum Pixie: Hits is the first greatest hits album by English recording artist Pixie Lott, released on 21 November 2014 by Virgin EMI Records.

The compilation also includes all her singles, from her three studio albums with the exception of "What Do You Take Me For?" and "Lay Me Down". The album includes the non-single album tracks "Coming Home" with Jason Derulo and "Break Up Song", as well as previously released covers of "(Your Love Keeps Lifting Me) Higher and Higher" and "Use Somebody" plus two tracks, "I Got Love for Xmas" and "Caravan of Love".

== Track listing ==
1. "Mama Do (Uh Oh, Uh Oh)" – 3:18
2. "Boys and Girls" – 3:04
3. "Cry Me Out" – 4:06
4. "Gravity" – 3:37
5. "Turn It Up" – 3:18
6. "Broken Arrow" – 3:38
7. "Coming Home" (featuring Jason Derulo) – 3:38
8. "All About Tonight" – 3:08
9. "Kiss the Stars" – 3:16
10. "Nasty" – 2:48
11. "(Your Love Keeps Lifting Me) Higher and Higher" – 3:25
12. "Break Up Song" – 3:49
13. "I Got Love for Xmas" – 3:51
14. "Caravan of Love" – 3:20
15. "Use Somebody" – 3:08

== Charts ==
Chart performance for Platinum Pixie: Hits
Chart (2014)	Peak position
UK Albums Chart	107
