= List of awards and nominations received by Pixie Lott =

Pixie Lott awards and nominations
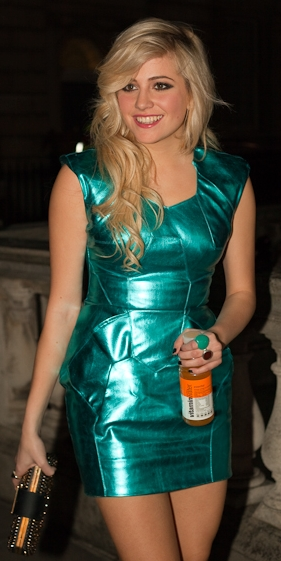
- Lott at London Fashion Week in February 2010
Award	Wins	Nominations
Brit Awards	0	4
BT Digital Music Awards	0	1
Glamour Awards	0	1
Meteor Music Awards	0	1
MP3 Music Awards	1	1
MTV Europe Music Awards	2	3
NME Awards	0	1
Q Awards	0	1
Ultimate Women of the Year Awards	1	1
UK Festival Awards	0	1
Variety Club Awards	1	1
Virgin Media Music Awards	2	2
- Totals
Awards won	7
Nominations	18

Pixie Lott is an English pop music singer-songwriter. Lott began her career as a songwriter, penning tracks for several artists in the late-2000s. In 2008, she signed a recording contract with Mercury Records in the United Kingdom and Interscope Records in the United States. She has released three studio albums: Turn It Up (2009), Young Foolish Happy (2011) and Pixie Lott (2014).

Turn It Up, her debut studio album, was released in September 2009. It reached number six in the UK and was certified double platinum by the British Phonographic Industry (BPI). Singles from the album included "Mama Do (Uh Oh, Uh Oh)" and "Boys and Girls". Turn It Up earned the singer six awards, including two MTV Europe Music Awards (Best UK & Ireland Act and MTV Push Artist), a Variety Club Award (Breakthrough Talent) and a Virgin Media Music Award (Best Newcomer).

Her second studio album, Young Foolish Happy, followed in November 2011. It peaked at number eighteen in the UK and was certified gold by the BPI. Singles included "All About Tonight" and "Kiss the Stars". The album earned Lott a second Virgin Media Music Award for Hottest Female and a BRIT Award nomination for Best British Single for "All About Tonight". Lott has also been recognized by the BT Digital Music Awards, Glamour Awards, Meteor Music Awards, MP3 Music Awards, NME Awards and Q Awards. Overall, she has received seven awards from eighteen nominations.

== BRIT Awards ==
The Brit Awards are the British Phonographic Industry's (BPI) annual pop music awards. Lott has received one award out of four nominations.

Year	Nominated work	Award	Result	Ref.
2010	Pixie Lott	British Female Solo Artist	Nominated	
2010	Pixie Lott	British Breakthrough Act	Nominated	
2010	"Mama Do (Uh Oh, Uh Oh)"	Best British Single	Nominated	
2012	"All About Tonight"	Best British Single	Nominated	

== BT Digital Music Awards ==
The BT Digital Music Awards are held annually in the United Kingdom. Lott has received one nomination.

Year	Nominated work	Award	Result	Ref.
2010	Pixie Lott	Best Female Artist	Nominated	

== Glamour Awards ==
The Glamour Awards are awarded annually by Glamour magazine to honour extraordinary and inspirational women from a variety of fields, including entertainment, business, sports, music, science, medicine, education and politics. Lott has received one nomination.

Year	Nominated work	Award	Result	Ref.
2010	Pixie Lott	Sheer Infusion Newcomer	Nominated	
2016	Breakfast at Tiffany's	Theatre Actress	Nominated	

== Meteor Music Awards ==
The Meteor Music Awards are distributed by MCD Productions and are the national music awards of Ireland. Lott has received one nomination.

Year	Nominated work	Award	Result	Ref.
2010	Pixie Lott	Best International Female	Nominated	

== MP3 Music Awards ==
The MP3 Music Awards were established in 2007 to honour popular artists and quality MP3 players and retailers. Lott has received one award from one nomination.

Year	Nominated work	Award	Result	Ref.
2009	"Mama Do"	The BUA Award	Won	
2014	"Lay Me Down"	The BFV Award	Nominated	

== MTV Europe Music Awards ==
The MTV Europe Music Awards were established in 1994 by MTV Europe to celebrate the most popular music videos in Europe. Lott has received two awards from three nominations.

Year	Nominated work	Award	Result	Ref.
2009	Pixie Lott	Best UK & Ireland Act	Won	
2009	Pixie Lott	Best Push Act	Won	
2009	Pixie Lott	Best New Act	Nominated	

== NME Awards ==
The NME Awards are an annual music awards show founded by the music magazine NME. Lott has received one nomination.

Year	Nominated work	Award	Result	Ref.
2010	Pixie Lott	Hottest Female	Nominated	

== Q Awards ==
The Q Awards are the UK's annual pop music awards run by the music magazine Q to honor musical excellence. Winners are voted by readers of Q. Lott has received one nomination.

Year	Nominated work	Award	Result	Ref.
2009	Pixie Lott	Breakthrough Artist	Nominated	

== Ultimate Women of the Year Awards ==
The Ultimate Women of the Year Awards are awarded annually by Cosmopolitan magazine. Lott has received one award from one nomination.

Year	Nominated work	Award	Result	Ref.
2010	Pixie Lott	Ultimate Newcomer	Won	

== UK Festival Awards ==
The UK Festival Awards are awarded annually, with various categories for all aspects of festivals that have taken place in the UK. Lott has received one nomination.

Year	Nominated work	Award	Result	Ref.
2009	Pixie Lott	Festival Fitty of the Year: Girls	Nominated	

== Variety Club Awards ==
The Variety Club Awards are an annual awards show presented by Variety, a children's charity. Lott has received one award from one nomination.

Year	Nominated work	Award	Result	Ref.
2009	Pixie Lott	Breakthrough Talent Award	Won	

== Virgin Media Music Awards ==
The Virgin Media Music Awards are held annually in the United Kingdom. Lott has received two awards from two nominations.

Year	Nominated work	Award	Result	Ref.
2009	Pixie Lott	Best Newcomer	Won	
2009	Pixie Lott	Hottest Female	Nominated	
2009	"Mama Do (Uh Oh, Uh Oh)"	Worst Track	Nominated	
2010	Pixie Lott	Hottest Female	Won	
2011	Pixie Lott	Hottest Female	Nominated	
2011	Pixie Lott	Best Female	Nominated	

== Žebřík Music Awards ==
Year	Nominated work	Award	Result	Ref.
2009	Pixie Lott	Best International Female	Nominated	
2009	Pixie Lott	Best International Discovery	Nominated	

== 4Music Video honours ==
The 4Music Video Honours is an annual music awards show by 4Music, a music and entertainment channel in the United Kingdom and available on some digital television providers in the Republic of Ireland.

Year	Nominated work	Award	Result	Ref.
2011	"All About Tonight"	Best Video	Nominated	
2011	Pixie Lott	Best Girl	Nominated	
