= Mads Hauge =

- Birth name: Mads Hauge
- Born: 10 February 1977 (age 48)
- Origin: Bergen, Norway

Mads Hauge (born 10 February 1977) is a Norwegian songwriter and producer from Bergen, Norway. He has written the Natasha Bedingfield hit Soulmate and various songs for Pixie Lott including Cry Me Out, Kiss the Stars and UK #1s Mama Do and Boys and Girls. He has also written for other artists, including the Eliza Doolittle song Go Home and the Darren Hayes song Nearly Love.
