= Encino (album) =

Studio album by Pixie Lott
- Released: 27 September 2024
- Length: 41:39
- Labels: BMG; Tag8

Pixie Lott chronology
Platinum Pixie: Hits (2014)	Encino (2024)

Singles from Encino
- 1. "Somebody’s Daughter" Released: 20 June 2024; 2. "Midnight Trash" Released: 22 August 2024

Encino is the fourth studio album by English singer Pixie Lott. It was released on 27 September 2024 through BMG and Tag8. Encino is Lott's first studio release since 2014's Pixie Lott. Two singles preceded the album's release – lead single "Somebody's Daughter", released on 20 June 2024, followed by "Midnight Trash", released on 22 August 2024.

== Recording and promotion ==
Recording for the album began in 2019 and concluded in early 2024. "Somebody's Daughter," which addresses toxic online behavior and bullying, was released as the album's lead single on June 20, 2024. "Midnight Trash" was released as the album's second single on August 22, 2024.

== Reception ==
Music Week called the album "a brilliant, candid and intimate body of work", and Renowned for Sound called it "without question, Pixie Lott’s best work to date", praising her growth as a lyricist and commenting favorably on the shift in genre and style from her previous work.

== Track listing ==
Encino standard edition track listing
No.	Title	Length
1.	"Show You Love"	3:41
2.	"Somebody’s Daughter"	3:12
3.	"Anybody Else"	3:39
4.	"Blockbuster Video"	3:19
5.	"Midnight Trash"	2:53
6.	"Further from Love"	3:02
7.	"Coco"	3:29
8.	"Happy"	2:22
9.	"Vintage"	3:25
10.	"Stars"	3:19
11.	"Say So"	3:28
12.	"All We Have Is Now"	3:08
13.	"Come Back Around"	2:42
Total length:		41:39

Encino – Digital Lost Songs Series 1 Edition
No.	Title	Length
14.	"Fight or Flight"	3:38
15.	"What My Heart Can Do Today"	3:07

Encino – Digital Lost Songs Series 2 Edition
No.	Title	Length
14.	"For Someone Else"	3:39
15.	"Goodnight Sunlight"	2:52

Encino – Digital Live at Kore Edition
No.	Title	Length
14.	"Somebody's Daughter" (live at Kore)	3:12
15.	"Midnight Trash" (live at Kore)	3:01
16.	"Blockbuster Video" (live at Kore)	3:20
17.	"Show You Love" (live at Kore)	3:43

== Charts ==
Chart performance for Encino
Chart (2024)	Peak position
Scottish Albums (Official Charts)	60
UK Album Downloads (Official Charts)	9
UK Independent Albums (Official Charts)	8
