= Ché Studios =

Menswear brand

CHÉ
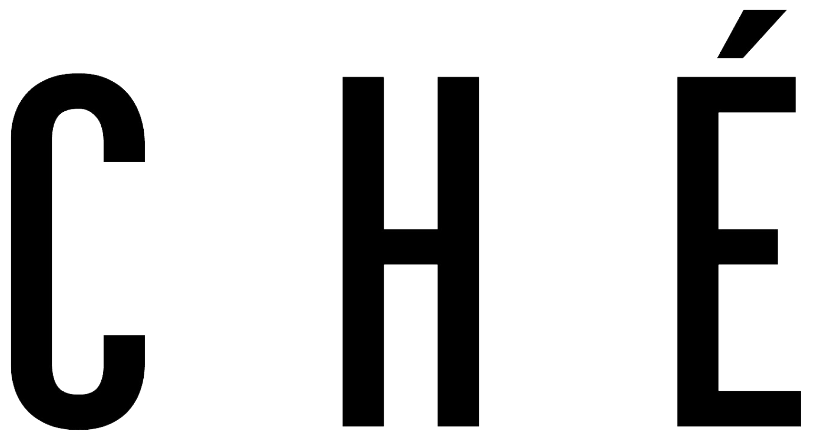
- Industry: Ecommerce Retail
- Founded: London 2019
- Founders: Oliver Cheshire Toby Watkins
- Products: Menswear Resort wear Swimwear
- Website: https://chestudios.co.uk/

CHÉ Studios is a London-based menswear brand founded in 2019 by British model Oliver Cheshire and manufacturer Toby Watkins. The brand produces swimwear and apparel.

== History ==
CHÉ Studios was established in 2019 by Oliver Cheshire and Toby Watkins. Cheshire began his modelling career at the age of fifteen and has worked in the fashion industry internationally. Watkins previously worked in finance before moving into clothing sourcing and manufacturing, where he developed experience in supply chain and operations.

The brand launched with a focus on men's resortwear and swimwear. Its early collections featured retro-inspired designs.

In 2022, CHÉ Studios collaborated with British fashion retailer Reiss on a capsule collection.

== Design ==
The brand's collections draw inspiration from coastal leisurewear and mid-20th-century photography, including imagery taken from Venice Beach and the French Riviera.

== Popular culture ==
CHÉ Studios Baller Shorts appeared in the third season of the television series The White Lotus.
