= Oliver Cheshire =

English fashion designer, model and fashion entrepreneur

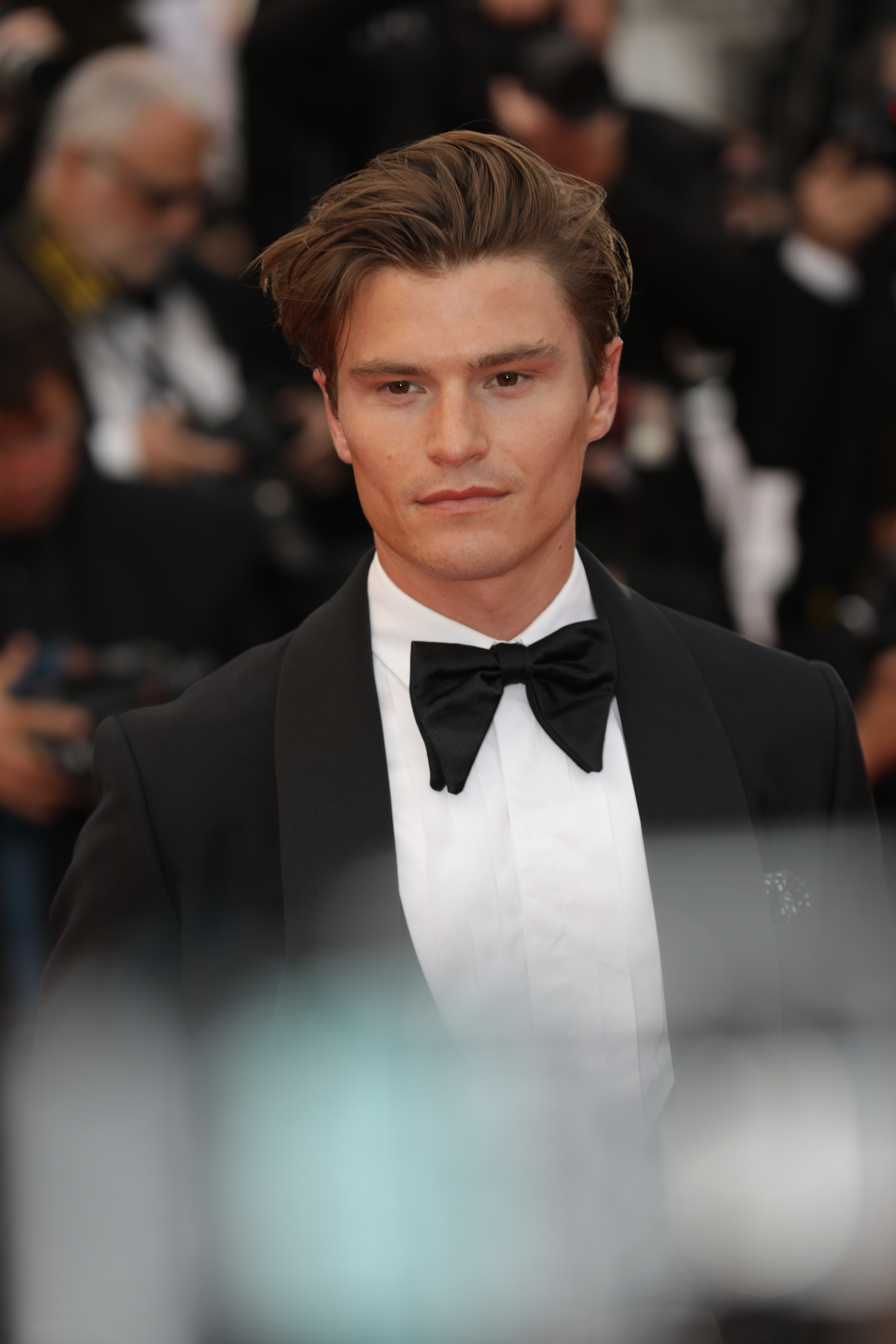
- Cheshire in 2019
- Born: Oliver Luke Cheshire; 3 June 1988 (age 38); Stevenage, Hertfordshire, England
- Spouse: Pixie Lott (m. 2022)
- Children: 2
- Modelling information
- Height: 6 ft 0 in (1.82 m)
- Hair colour: Light brown
- Eye colour: Brown
- Agency: Select Model Management
- Website: Oliver Cheshire on Instagram

Oliver Luke Cheshire (born 3 June 1988) is an English fashion designer, model and entrepreneur.

== Career ==
Cheshire was born in Stevenage, Hertfordshire and grew up in Hitchin. His father was a fireman and Cheshire aspired to be a firefighter or actor.

Cheshire was scouted by Select Model Management at the age of 15. Soon after, he gave up his drama school studies for a career as a model and appeared in a campaign for Calvin Klein. Cheshire subsequently modelled for Jack Wills, Dolce & Gabbana, Versace, Orlebar Brown, Stella McCartney, Missoni, Hackett, Abercrombie & Fitch, Hollister Co., Vivienne Westwood, Gap Inc. and Marks and Spencer. Marks and Spencer reported a fifty per cent increase in the sale of men's swimwear while Cheshire was fronting their campaign.

As a writer, Cheshire has reported on Men's Fashion Week for GQ magazine and The Telegraph. In 2015, he was named one of GQ's 50 best dressed British men.

CHÉ Studios

In 2018, Oliver Cheshire founded CHÉ Studios, a men’s clothing brand. The name CHÉ is derived from the first three letters of Cheshire’s surname.

== Personal life ==
Cheshire began a relationship with singer-songwriter Pixie Lott in 2010. The pair were engaged in November 2016. They were married at Ely Cathedral on 6 June 2022, following a delay due to COVID-19. In June 2023, the couple announced that they were expecting their first child. They were spotted with their child in October. The next month, Lott confirmed they had a son.
