= Lisa Lois =

Dutch singer

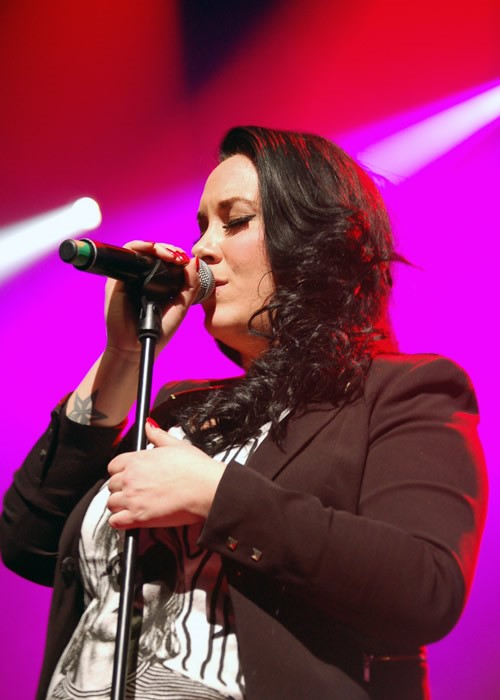
- Lisa Lois gave a concert in Heineken Music Hall

Background information
- Born: Lisa Hordijk; 22 June 1987 (age 39)
- Origin: Wageningen, Netherlands
- Genres: soul, pop, jazz
- Occupation: Singer
- Instrument: Vocals
- Years active: 2009—present
- Website: lisalois.com

Lisa Lois (born 22 June 1987 as Lisa Hordijk) is a Dutch singer who rose to prominence after winning the second season of talent show X Factor. In 2009, she changed her stage name to Lisa Lois and released her debut album Smoke.

== Early life ==
Lois was born in Wageningen, Netherlands. She studied at the Rock Academy in Tilburg and at the Utrecht-based Herman Brood Academy.

== 2009–present ==
After winning the X-Factor, she released her debut single, a cover of her winning piece Leonard Cohen's "Hallelujah" as 'Lisa'. The single went straight to number one in the Dutch Top 40. "Hallelujah" went double platinum within one month, selling over 100,000 copies as of today and becoming the best-selling single of 2009 in the Netherlands. Her second single "No Good for Me" written by Pixie Lott and Phil Thornalley was released on 13 November 2009. Two weeks later her debut album Smoke was released. Lisa's third single from the album is "Promises, Promises" written by Pixie Lott, Martin Sutton and Chris Neill.

In August 2012 Lisa announced by Facebook and Twitter she will join Allen Stone with his European tour.

Lisa planned her second studio album in winter 2012. The first single from this album was released in the beginning of January 2013. In short time it reached number 4 in the Dutch iTunes Charts.

== Discography ==
=== Studio albums ===
Year	Album details	Peak	Certifications (sales threshold)
Year	Album details	NL	Certifications (sales threshold)
2009	Smoke: Release date: 27 November 2009; Label: Sony BMG	4	NL: Gold
2013	Breaking Away: Release date:	10	TBA

=== Singles ===
Year	Title	Peak positions			iTunes			
Year	Title	NET 100	NET 40	BE (FL) 50	NET	BE	GH	KZ
2009	"Hallelujah"	1	1	-	-	-	-	-
2009	"No Good For Me"	4	26	-	-	-	-	-
2010	"Promises, Promises"	44	35	-	89	-	-	-
2010	"Little By Little"	71	47	-	-	-	-	-
2010	"Love Me Tender"	85	57	-	-	-	-	-
2012	"Euphoria"	87	-	-	23	-	-	-
2013	"Silhouette"	31	32	-	4	-	24	8
2013	"Crazy"	81	45	-	-	-	-	-
2014	"The Devil (The Hit)"	-	-	-	15	-	-	-
2014	"De Neus Omhoog"	-	-	-	81	-	-	-

=== Featuring ===
Year	Title	Peak positions			iTunes			
Year	Title	NET 100	NET 40	BE (FL) 50	NET	BE	GH	KZ
2013	"Koningslied"	1	2	41	1	20	-	-

Preceded by Sharon Kips	X Factor (Netherlands); Winner; 2009	Succeeded by Jaap van Reesema
