= Pixie Lott (album) =

Studio album by Pixie Lott
- Released: 1 August 2014
- Recorded: 2012–2013
- Genre: Pop; R&B; soul
- Length: 42:36
- Label: Virgin EMI
- Producer: A.D.A.M.; Jerry Abbott; Rami Afuni; Craze & Hoax; Dreamlab; Jon Green; Mads Hauge; Jay Reynolds; Jack Splash; Phil Thornalley

Pixie Lott chronology
Young Foolish Happy (2011)	Pixie Lott (2014)	Platinum Pixie: Hits (2014)

Singles from Pixie Lott
- 1. "Nasty" Released: 7 March 2014; 2. "Lay Me Down" Released: 25 July 2014

Pixie Lott is the third studio album by English singer Pixie Lott. It was released on 1 August 2014 by Virgin EMI Records. Lott began recording the album in mid-2012, citing Motown as an influence on the album. "Nasty" was released as the album's lead single on 7 March 2014. The second single, "Lay Me Down", was released on 25 July 2014.

== Background ==
The album was primarily recorded in London and New York City, as well as in Miami.

During a Google+ Hangout on 2 December 2013, Lott announced that her third album would be titled Pixie Lott, along with the accompanying artwork. She explained to Billboard that the album would be self-titled because this one "represents me the most out of all of my albums", adding, "My last album had some dance tracks and some soul tracks, but this one is more centered."

== Promotion and singles ==
In November 2013, Lott unveiled a preview of the music video for the single "Nasty". In early December, it was confirmed that "Nasty", which was originally recorded by Christina Aguilera as a duet with CeeLo Green for the 2010 film Burlesque, would serve as the album's lead single. Released on 7 March 2014, the single reached number nine on the UK Singles Chart and number 43 on the Irish Singles Chart.

A music video for the song "Heart Cry" was filmed in Paris and premiered on 17 December 2013. On 21 July 2014, the track was released as a free download through Amazon.co.uk for a limited time.

"Lay Me Down" was released on 25 July 2014 as the second single from the album. The song peaked at number 114 on the UK Singles Chart.

"Break Up Song" was set to be released as the album's third single, but it was ultimately cancelled. The music video was directed by Nick Bartlett and premiered on 19 September 2014. The video was filmed at The Waldorf Hilton Hotel London and co-stars Lott's boyfriend, model Oliver Cheshire.

== Critical reception ==
Professional ratings
Review scores
Source	Rating
AllMusic	3/5 stars
Daily Express	2/5
Hot Press	3/5
Irish Independent	2/5 stars
London Evening Standard	3/5 stars
The Observer	1/5 stars
The Times	2/5 stars
Virgin Media	3/5 stars

Pixie Lott received mixed reviews from contemporary music critics. Stephen Thomas Erlewine of AllMusic wrote that although the album "does attempt to tone down her girlishness", Lott "can't run away from her ebullient instincts, and that sprightliness is why Pixie Lott is an enjoyable piece of high gloss pop." John Walshe of Hot Press commented that Lott "succeeds in unleashing her inner diva throughout these highly polished R&B-tinged pop standards, complete with backing vocals that could have been lifted from the golden era of soul music itself." David Smyth of the London Evening Standard noted that the album trades "the electronic pop touches of its predecessor" for "a more organic sound that comes across like a lightweight Amy Winehouse", while complimenting the songs "Break Up Song", "Bang" and "Kill a Man". However, Smyth concluded that "Lott sings with a lot of bravura but surprisingly little soul."

Martin Townsend of the Daily Express was complimentary of opening song "Nasty", but criticised the rest of the album as "standard, crescendoing modern r'n'b distinguished only by Lott's rather unattractive nasal warble." Matthew Horton of Virgin Media opined that the album "suggests Pixie Lott [...] is a genuine retro-soul diva, comfortable with the grandstanding ballads and the slinky R&B stompers", but felt that "[t]he risk with these retro tools is slipping into pastiche". Despite stating that tracks like "Leaving You" and "Cry and Smile" "best showcase [Lott's] smoky vocals", the Irish Independent characterised the album as "a middle ground of Bruno Mars and edgeless Winehouse", expressing that its "main issue" is that "almost everything about it is second-hand." Will Hodgkinson of The Times commented that "[y]ou can't get away from the feeling that [Lott] is imitating a soul singer rather than actually being one", adding that "while you can see the record company-led logic of Lott moving away from pure pop and heading towards classic soul, it's a misguided and unconvincing new look." Killian Fox of The Observer wrote, "The execution is proficient enough, but everything about the album lacks character, from the anodyne production to the wafer-thin songs, which reveal what they're all about within the first verse."

== Commercial performance ==
Pixie Lott debuted at number 15 on the UK Albums Chart, selling 3,895 copies in its first week. The following week, the album fell to number 94 with 934 copies sold.

== Track listing ==
No.	Title	Writer(s)	Producer(s)	Length
1.	"Nasty"	Jack Splash; Thomas Callaway; Claude Kelly; Harry Casey; Richard Finch; Billy Nichols; James Brown	Splash	2:46
2.	"Lay Me Down"	Adam Pallin; Ashton Parson; Matt Parad	A.D.A.M.; Jerry Abbott^{[a]}	3:25
3.	"Break Up Song"	Pixie Lott; Rami Afuni; Jim Irvin	Afuni; Abbott^{[b]}	3:46
4.	"Champion"	Jonathan Green; Mads Hauge; Phil Thornalley	Hauge; Jon Green; Thornalley	2:54
5.	"Kill a Man"	P. Lott; Afuni; Louis M. Freeze; Larry E. Muggerud; Senen Reyes; Lowell Fulson; Jimmy McCracklin	Afuni; Abbott^{[b]}	3:17
6.	"Ain't Got You"	Andrew Wyatt	Abbott	4:08
7.	"Heart Cry"	Afuni	Afuni; Abbott^{[b]}	3:32
8.	"Ocean"	P. Lott; Abbott; Irvin	Abbott	4:12
9.	"Raise Up"	P. Lott; Harry Craze; Hugo Chegwin; Lisa Greene; Gavin Jones	Craze & Hoax^{[c]}; Abbott^{[b]}	3:36
10.	"Bang"	P. Lott; Afuni; Maureen Anne McDonald	Afuni; Abbott^{[b]}	3:34
11.	"Leaving You"	P. Lott; Abbott; Irvin	Abbott	3:47
12.	"Cry and Smile"	P. Lott; Charlie-Ann Lott; Abbott; Andrew Jackson	Abbott	3:39

Japanese edition bonus tracks
No.	Title	Writer(s)	Producer(s)	Length
13.	"(Your Love Keeps Lifting Me) Higher and Higher"	Gary Jackson; Raynard Miner; Carl Smith	Abbott	3:26
14.	"Cry Baby"	P. Lott; Daniel James; Leah Haywood; Kasia Livingston	Dreamlab; Abbott^{[b]}	3:31
15.	"The Girl You Left Behind"	P. Lott; Abbott; Irvin	Abbott	3:15
16.	"Nasty" (The Vamps duet)	Splash; Callaway; Kelly; Casey; Finch; Nichols; Brown	Jay Reynolds; Splash	2:47

Notes

- ^{^a} signifies a vocal producer
- ^{^b} signifies an additional producer
- ^{^c} signifies an original producer

Sample credits

- "Nasty" features song adaptations of "Dance Across the Floor" written Harry Casey and Richard Finch, "Do It ('Til You're Satisfied)" written by Billy Nichols, and "Funky President (People It's Bad)" written by James Brown.

== Personnel ==
Credits adapted from the liner notes of the Japanese edition of Pixie Lott.

- Pixie Lott – vocals (all tracks); backing vocals (track 12)
- Jerry Abbott – vocal production (track 2); vocal recording (tracks 3, 5, 10, 14); percussion (tracks 3, 5–7, 9, 10, 12, 15); bass (tracks 3, 5, 7, 10–13, 15); additional keyboards (tracks 3, 5, 7, 9, 10); additional production (tracks 3, 5, 7, 9, 10, 14); guitar (tracks 3, 5, 7, 8, 10–13, 15); additional engineering (tracks 3, 6, 8, 9, 14); engineering (tracks 5, 7, 10–13, 15); production (tracks 6, 8, 11–13, 15); programming (tracks 6, 8, 9, 11–13, 15); recording (tracks 8, 11, 15); mixing (tracks 8, 11, 12, 15); keyboards (tracks 12, 13, 15); handclaps (track 13)
- Rami Afuni – production (tracks 3, 5, 7, 10)
- Connor Ball – bass, vocals (track 16)
- Nick Barr – viola (tracks 6, 9)
- Ian Burdge – cello (tracks 6, 9)
- Simon Clarke – saxophone (tracks 6, 8)
- Craze & Hoax – original production (track 9)
- Tim Debney – mastering engineering (track 15)
- Alison Dods – violin (tracks 6, 9)
- Dreamlab – production (track 14)
- Michael Duke – additional vocals (tracks 1, 16)
- Coco Dupree – backing vocals (tracks 3, 5, 7, 10, 11)
- Jake Edwards-Wood – Hammond organ, piano (track 11)
- Benjamin Epstein – bass (tracks 6, 8)
- Tristan Evans – drums, vocals (track 16)
- Ben 'Jah' Fairman – voice of boxing commentator (track 4)
- Jon Green – backing vocals, bass guitar, production (track 4); guitar, keyboards (tracks 4, 6); piano (tracks 4, 9); Hammond organ (track 8)
- Searah Hall – backing vocals (tracks 6, 9)
- Mads Hauge – backing vocals, production (track 4)
- Stuart Hawkes – mastering engineering (tracks 1–14)
- Sally Herbert – string arrangement (track 6); violin (tracks 6, 9); string session (track 9)
- Emily Holligan – backing vocals (tracks 3, 5–11)
- Kick Horns – horns (tracks 6, 8)
- Jim Irvin – percussion (tracks 8, 11); additional programming (track 11)
- Andrew Jackson – backing vocals (track 12)
- Oli Langford – violin (tracks 6, 9)
- Dave Liddell – trombone (tracks 6, 8)
- Joshua McKenzie – drums (track 6); additional drums (track 8)
- James McVey – guitar, vocals (track 16)
- Elisabeth Melton – backing vocals (tracks 6, 9)
- Grace Mitchell – backing vocals (tracks 6, 9)
- George Murphy – recording engineering (tracks 6, 9); percussion (track 6); bass, Hammond and horn engineering and recording (track 8)
- Andrew Murray – string arrangement, string programming (track 3); Wurlitzer (track 6); piano (tracks 6, 8); Hammond organ (track 8)
- Michael James Onufrak – string arrangement (track 2)
- Adam Pallin – engineering, production, programming (track 2)
- Matt Parad – whistles (track 2)
- Ashton Parsons – backing vocals (track 2)
- Ryan Quigley – trumpet (tracks 6, 8)
- Jay Reynolds – mixing (tracks 1, 2, 4, 6, 9, 16); additional drum programming (tracks 1, 2, 6, 9, 16); additional drums, programming (track 4); keyboards, production (track 16)
- Kate Robinson – violin (tracks 6, 9)
- Tim Sanders – tenor saxophone (tracks 6, 8)
- Bradley Simpson – guitar, vocals (track 16)
- Jack Splash – arrangement, drums, engineering, keyboards, percussion, production, programming (tracks 1, 16)
- Paul Spong – trumpet (tracks 6, 8)
- Mark 'Spike' Stent – mixing (track 14)
- Phil Thornalley – backing vocals, electric sitar, guitar, drums, percussion, production, programming (track 4)
- David Tozer – mixing (track 13)
- Jeremy Wheatley – mixing (tracks 3, 5, 7, 10)
- Lucy Wilkins – violin (tracks 6, 9)
- Christian Wright – mastering engineering (track 16)

== Charts ==
Chart (2014)	Peak position
Irish Albums (IRMA)	100
Scottish Albums (OCC)	19
South Korean Albums (Gaon)	80
UK Albums (OCC)	15

== Release history ==
Region	Date	Format	Label	Ref.
Ireland	1 August 2014	CD; digital download	Virgin EMI	
United Kingdom	4 August 2014	CD; digital download	Virgin EMI	
Germany	6 August 2014	Digital download	Universal	
Japan	6 August 2014	CD; digital download	Universal	
Australia	8 August 2014	Digital download	Universal	
Germany	8 August 2014	CD	Universal	
