= Turn It Up (Pixie Lott album) =

Studio album by Pixie Lott
- Released: 11 September 2009
- Studio: Swamp (West Hampstead, London) (Note: Tracks 1 and 5); Livingston (London) (Note: Strings on track 2); Gad (Ibiza) (Note: Drums on track 9); Strawberrybee (New York City) (Note: Track 9); Henson (Los Angeles) (Note: Track 10)
- Genre: Pop; R&B
- Length: 40:34
- Label: Mercury
- Producer: Cutfather; Toby Gad; Mads Hauge; Jonas Jeberg; Ryan Laubscher; RedOne; Phil Thornalley; Peter Zizzo

Pixie Lott chronology
Turn It Up (2009)	Young Foolish Happy (2011)

Alternative cover
- Turn It Up Louder cover

Singles from Turn It Up
- 1. "Mama Do (Uh Oh, Uh Oh)" Released: 3 June 2009; 2. "Boys and Girls" Released: 5 September 2009; 3. "Cry Me Out" Released: 30 November 2009; 4. "Gravity" Released: 8 March 2010; 5. "Turn It Up" Released: 7 June 2010; 6. "Broken Arrow" Released: 10 October 2010

Turn It Up is the debut studio album by the English singer Pixie Lott, released on 11 September 2009 by Mercury Records. The album's first two singles, "Mama Do (Uh Oh, Uh Oh)" and "Boys and Girls", both topped the UK Singles Chart, while subsequent singles "Cry Me Out", "Gravity" and "Turn It Up" all reached the top 20. Turn It Up peaked at number six on the UK Albums Chart and was certified triple platinum by the British Phonographic Industry, with sales in excess of 900,000 copies.

The album was re-released as Turn It Up Louder on 18 October 2010. It was preceded by the release of "Broken Arrow" as its lead single, and includes nine other bonus songs. In 2010, it was reported that Interscope Records was planning to release Turn It Up in the United States with new songs in early 2011, which never materialised.

== Singles ==
"Mama Do (Uh Oh, Uh Oh)" was released on 3 June 2009 as the album's lead single. It debuted at number one on the UK Singles Chart, making Lott the second British female solo artist to have a debut single enter atop the chart without previously appearing on a reality television show, after Billie Piper.

Follow-up single "Boys and Girls" was released on 5 September 2009, a week before the album's release. The song debuted at number 73 on the UK Singles Chart before climbing to number one the following week, earning Lott her second consecutive chart-topper and breaking the record of the biggest leap to the top position in the UK chart history.

"Cry Me Out", released as the third single on 30 November 2009, peaked at number 12 on the UK chart, Lott's first single to miss the top 10.

"Gravity" was released as the album's fourth single on 8 March 2010. It charted at number 20 in the UK, making it her fourth consecutive top-20 single.

"Turn It Up" was released as the fifth single on 7 June 2010, for which a music video, directed by Nick Frew, was shot in Los Angeles on 17 April 2010. The single became her fifth consecutive top-20 entry when it peaked at number 11 on the UK Singles Chart.

"Broken Arrow" was released on 10 October 2010 as the only single (sixth overall) from the Turn It Up Louder reissue. The music video was directed by Gregg Masuak, and premiered on 16 September 2010. The single reached number 12 on the UK chart, giving Lott her sixth consecutive top-20 single.

Although it was initially suggested that "Coming Home", a collaboration with American R&B singer Jason Derulo, was originally going to serve as the second single from Turn It Up Louder after it debuted at number 51 on the UK Singles Chart, Lott later confirmed on her official Twitter page that she was filming a video for "Can't Make This Over". The video premiered on 25 November 2010, but the single release was ultimately cancelled.

== Critical reception ==
Professional ratings
Aggregate scores
Source	Rating
Metacritic	51/100
Review scores
Source	Rating
AllMusic	4/5 stars
BBC Music	Favourable
Daily Express	2/5
The Daily Telegraph	3/5 stars
Digital Spy	3/5 stars
musicOMH	2/5 stars
The Observer	Mixed
The Sunday Times	4/5 stars
Yahoo! Music	7/10 stars

Turn It Up received mixed reviews from music critics. At Metacritic, which assigns a weighted mean rating out of 100 to reviews from mainstream critics, the album received an average score of 51, based on eight reviews, which indicates "mixed or average reviews". Paul Lester of BBC Music described the album as a "classy, if not classic, debut from potential-rich pop newcomer" and stated that the songs on the album "do indeed sound as though they could be farmed out to other RnB starlets. That's a compliment as much as it is a criticism: from the 1960s soul stomp of her number one hit 'Mama Do (Uh Oh, Uh Oh)' to new single 'Boys & Girls' with its brassy Mark Ronson-esque production, some of the material here lacks character." Stephen Thomas Erlewine of AllMusic wrote, "Despite this fondness for swinging girl group sounds and Pixie's predilection for belting out the songs, Turn It Up doesn't play as a retro-soul throwback, the way Winehouse or Duffy do. Lott never attempts to seem wiser than her years, [...] and the production is wisely, slyly modern."

Digital Spy music editor Nick Levine commented that "Turn It Up is never dull—Lott has too much natural exuberance for that—but it's a little safe and lacking in surprises", citing "Gravity", "Turn It Up" and "Here We Go Again" as highlights. Dan Cairns of The Sunday Times opined that "[b]ar two missteps ('My Love' and 'Nothing Compares'), Turn It Up is superior, infectious, expertly tailored pop that, had it been recorded 30 or so years ago, would very likely now be being praised to the heavens in reissue sections." Dan Gennoe of Yahoo! Music noted that "[t]he sass, swagger, killer hooks and big production have been focused on the obvious chart contenders and the rest of the album is, true to tradition, a lot of middle of the road balladry and overly earnest swaying, also known as filler." Daily Express reviewer Robert Spellman felt that the single "Mama Do (Uh Oh, Uh Oh)" "promised what the album hasn't delivered, a sort sultry self-confidence with a pinch of the wreckless [sic] that would do Lady Gaga proud", adding that "corny power ballads such as 'Cry Me Out' and too much half-baked R&B mistakenly attempt to give Pixie depth when she—or rather her writers—should be gunning for surface only." The Daily Telegraph's Helen Brown referred to Lott as "[f]un and feisty but hard to distinguish from the rest of this year's girl pop pack." In a review for musicOMH, Michael Cragg dismissed the album as "a fairly average pop album being strangled by a talented vocalist who equates loudness with emotion." Imogen Carter of The Observer compared the album to a "Disney teen-movie soundtrack", calling it "cloying and cliche-ridden, particularly the slow numbers."

== Commercial performance ==
Turn It Up debuted at number six on the UK Albums Chart, selling 25,652 copies in its first week. Following the album's re-release Turn It Up Louder on 18 October 2010, it rose from number 29 to number nine on 24 October with 15,114 copies sold. On 19 November 2021, the album was certified triple platinum by the British Phonographic Industry (BPI), denoting sales of 900,000 units across the UK. In Ireland, Turn It Up debuted and peaked at number 18 on the Irish Albums Chart for the week ending 17 September 2009.

The album saw modest success across continental Europe, reaching number 16 in Denmark, number 24 on the European Top 100 Albums chart, number 49 in Switzerland, number 60 in France, number 70 in Austria and Belgium's Wallonia, number 81 in Germany, number 92 in the Netherlands and number 99 in Belgium's Flanders. In Oceania, it peaked at number eight on the Australian Hitseekers Albums Chart and at number 30 in New Zealand.

== Track listing ==
Turn It Up track listing
No.	Title	Writer(s)	Producer(s)	Length
1.	"Mama Do (Uh Oh, Uh Oh)"	Mads Hauge; Phil Thornalley	Hauge; Thornalley; Greg Kurstin^{[a]}	3:16
2.	"Cry Me Out"	Pixie Lott; Hauge; Thornalley; Colin Campsie	Hauge; Thornalley	4:04
3.	"Band Aid"	Toby Gad; Lott	Gad	3:30
4.	"Turn It Up"	Lott; Ruth-Anne Cunningham; Jonas Jeberg; Mich Hansen	Jeberg; Cutfather	3:16
5.	"Boys and Girls"	Hauge; Thornalley; Lott	Hauge; Thornalley; Fraser T. Smith^{[a]}	3:02
6.	"Gravity"	Ina Wroldsen; Jeberg; Hansen; Lucas Secon	Jeberg; Cutfather	3:35
7.	"My Love"	Lott; Cunnigham; Jeberg; Hansen	Jeberg; Cutfather	3:19
8.	"Jack"	Peter Zizzo; Lott; Marion Raven	Zizzo	3:12
9.	"Nothing Compares"	Gad; Kaci Brown; Lott	Gad	3:34
10.	"Here We Go Again"	Lott; RedOne; Steve Kipner; Andy Frampton	RedOne	3:05
11.	"The Way the World Works"	Zizzo; Lott	Zizzo	3:11
12.	"Hold Me in Your Arms"	Lott; Ryan Laubscher	Laubscher	3:30
Total length:				40:34

Argentinean bonus track
No.	Title	Writer(s)	Length
13.	"Sufrirás (Hurt)" (with David Bisbal)	Dimitri Stassos; Linda Sundblad; Måns Zelmerlöw; Cris Zalles	3:26

Revised digital edition bonus track
No.	Title	Writer(s)	Length
13.	"If I Changed"	Lott; Gad	3:45

iTunes Store bonus track
No.	Title	Writer(s)	Length
13.	"Use Somebody"	Caleb Followill; Nathan Followill; Jared Followill; Matthew Followill	3:06

UK and Irish iTunes Store deluxe edition bonus tracks
No.	Title	Writer(s)	Producer(s)	Length
14.	"When Love Takes Over"	Kelly Rowland; David Guetta; Fred Rister; Olivia Nervo; Miriam Nervo	Thornalley; Hauge	3:20
15.	"Without You"	Lott; Harvey Mason Jr.; Kara DioGuardi; Steve Russell	Mason	3:50
16.	"Rolling Stone"	Lott; RedOne; Bilal "The Chef" Hajji; Kinnda "Kee" Hamid	RedOne	3:40
17.	"Want You"	Johannes Joergensen; Daniel "Obi" Klein; Tim McEwan; Lott	Deekay	3:58
18.	"Silent Night"	Traditional		3:11

Turn It Up Louder bonus tracks
No.	Title	Writer(s)	Producer(s)	Length
18.	"Broken Arrow"	Lott; Cunningham; Gad	Gad; Jay Reynolds^{[a]}	3:39
19.	"Coming Home" (featuring Jason Derulo)	Lott; Sirach Charles; Derulo	James F. Reynolds; Zach Hancock^{[b]}	3:36
20.	"Doing Fine (Without You)"	Lott; Chris Braide; Cathy Dennis	Braide; James F. Reynolds^{[a]}	3:09
21.	"Can't Make This Over"	Daniel Bedingfield; Eve Nelson	John Shanks	3:33
22.	"Catching Snowflakes"	Lott; Teemu Brunila	Jay Reynolds; Fred Ball^{[c]}	3:50
Total length:				76:04

Turn It Up Louder – iTunes Store bonus track
No.	Title	Writer(s)	Producer(s)	Length
23.	"Broken Arrow" (Devos & Devereux Remix)	Lott; Cunningham; Gad	Gad; Reynolds^{[a]}	7:41

=== Notes ===
- ^{^[a]} signifies an additional producer
- ^{^[b]} signifies an extra vocal producer
- ^{^[c]} signifies a vocal producer
- "Coming Home" incorporates elements of "(I Just) Died in Your Arms" by Cutting Crew.
- The enhanced CD includes a link to a bonus area on Push Entertainment, which can only be accessed by inserting the CD into a computer's CD/DVD drive, featuring the music videos of "Boys and Girls" and "Mama Do (Uh Oh, Uh Oh)" that can be watched online and downloaded for free.

== Personnel ==
Credits adapted from the liner notes of Turn It Up.

Musicians

- Pixie Lott – vocals (all tracks); background vocals (tracks 1–3, 5, 11)
- Mads Hauge – drums, keyboards (track 1); bass, guitar, programming (tracks 1, 2, 5); background vocals (tracks 1, 2); Wurlitzer (track 5)
- Phil Thornalley – drums (track 1); piano (tracks 1, 5); glockenspiel (track 2); guitar (track 5)
- Anders Kallmark – synthesiser (track 1)
- John Thirkell – trumpet, flugelhorn (tracks 1, 5)
- Phil Smith – tenor saxophone, baritone saxophone (tracks 1, 5)
- Sally Herbert – string arrangements, conducting (tracks 2, 6)
- Everton Nelson – violin (track 2)
- Richard George – violin (track 2)
- Emlyn Singleton – violin (tracks 2, 6)
- Julia Singleton – violin (tracks 2, 6)
- Jackie Norrie – violin (track 2)
- Rick Koster – violin (tracks 2, 6)
- Calina de la Mare – violin (tracks 2, 6)
- Bruce White – viola (tracks 2, 6)
- Claire Orsler – viola (tracks 2, 6)
- Clare Finnimore – viola (track 2)
- Ian Burdge – cello (tracks 2, 6)
- Chris Worsey – cello (track 2)
- Jon Green – guitar, piano (track 2)
- David Tench – Wurlitzer (track 2)
- Toby Gad – all instruments, arrangement (tracks 3, 9); guitars, bass (track 9)
- Jonas Jeberg – all instruments (track 4); all other instruments (tracks 6, 7)
- Mich Hansen – percussion (tracks 4, 6, 7)
- Ina Wroldsen – background vocals (track 6)
- Daniel Davidsen – guitar (tracks 6, 7)
- Warren Zielinski – violin (track 6)
- Brian Wright – violin (track 6)
- Natalia Bonner – violin (track 6)
- Nick Barr – viola (track 6)
- Sophie Harris – cello (track 6)
- Peter Zizzo – background vocals (track 8); arrangement, instrumental programming (tracks 8, 11)
- Marion Raven – background vocals (track 8)
- Miklós Malek – additional synth programming (track 8)
- Kaci Brown – all background vocals, arrangement (track 9)
- Jens Gad – drums (track 9)
- Rich Adam – additional programming (track 9)
- RedOne – all instruments, instrumental programming, vocal arrangement (track 10)
- Johnny Severin – electric guitar (track 10)

Technical

- Mads Hauge – production, recording engineering (tracks 1, 2, 5); Pro Tools (tracks 1, 2)
- Phil Thornalley – production (tracks 1, 2, 5)
- Chris Sansom – additional engineering (tracks 1, 2, 5)
- Greg Kurstin – additional production (track 1)
- Phil Tan – mixing (tracks 1, 2, 4, 6–8, 11)
- Carlos Oyanedel – additional mix engineering (tracks 1, 2, 4, 6–8)
- Tom Coyne – mastering (tracks 1, 2, 4, 6, 7)
- Graham Linehy – string recording (track 2)
- Toby Gad – production (tracks 3, 9)
- Tony Maserati – mixing (track 3)
- Marc Burkhart – recording engineering assistance (track 3)
- Geoff Pesche – mastering engineering (tracks 3, 5, 8–12)
- Jonas Jeberg – production (tracks 4, 6, 7)
- Cutfather – production (tracks 4, 6, 7)
- Fraser T. Smith – additional production, additional mix (track 5)
- Beatriz Artola – engineering (track 5)
- Mo Hausler – string recording (track 6)
- Peter Zizzo – production, recording (tracks 8, 11)
- Jeremy Wheatley – mixing (track 9)
- Jens Gad – drum recording (track 9)
- RedOne – production, vocal editing, recording, engineering (track 10)
- Johnny Severin – vocal editing, recording, engineering (track 10)
- Robert Orton – mixing (track 10)
- Ryan Laubscher – production (track 12)
- Mads Nilsson – mixing (track 12)
- Louis Odunoye – mixing assistance (track 12)

Artwork

- Sandrine Dulermo – photography
- Michael Labica – photography
- Paul West – design
- Joe Wassell-Smith – design assistance

=== Turn It Up Louder ===
Credits adapted from the liner notes of Turn It Up Louder.

Musicians

- Pixie Lott – vocals (all tracks); background vocals (tracks 14, 18, 19)
- Al Shux – guitar (track 13)
- Jon Green – piano, tack piano, glockenspiel (track 14)
- Tom Meadows – drums (track 14)
- Mads Hauge – guitar, background vocals, programming, arrangement (track 14)
- Phil Thornalley – glockenspiel, programming (track 14)
- Everton Nelson – violin leader (track 14)
- Warren Zielinski – violin (track 14)
- Bruce White – viola (track 14)
- Ian Burdge – cello (track 14)
- Sally Herbert – arrangement (track 14)
- Harvey Mason Jr. – music (track 15)
- Andrew Hey – guitar (track 15)
- Rob Knox – drum programming (track 15)
- RedOne – all instruments, instrumental programming, vocal arrangement (track 16)
- Johnny Severin – electric guitar (track 16)
- Deekay – arrangement (track 17)
- Tim McEwan – all instruments (track 17)
- Obi – all instruments (track 17)
- Josh – all instruments (track 17)
- Lars Jensen – additional percussion (track 17)
- Martin Larsson – additional keys (track 17)
- Toby Gad – instruments, arrangement (track 18)
- Mark Pusey – drums (tracks 18, 22)
- Oliver Weeks – keyboards (track 18)
- Jay Reynolds – programming (tracks 18, 22)
- Jason Derulo – background vocals (track 19)
- Victoria Akintola – background vocals (track 19)
- Sirach "Angel" Charles – background vocals (track 19)
- John Shanks – guitars, bass (track 21)
- Charles Judge – keyboards (track 21)
- Dan Chase – keyboards, programming (track 21)
- Eve Nelson – keyboards (track 21)
- Jeff Rothschild – programming (track 21)
- Teemu Brunila – piano (track 22)
- Fabien Waltmann – programming (track 22)
- Paul Canning – background vocals (track 22)
- Marli Harwood – background vocals (track 22)

Technical

- Mark Bishop – recording (track 13)
- Phil Thornalley – production (track 14)
- Mads Hauge – production (track 14)
- Harvey Mason Jr. – production (track 15)
- Andrew Hey – recording (track 15)
- David Boyd – recording, mixing assistance (track 15)
- Dabling Harward – recording (track 15)
- Dave Russell – mixing (track 15)
- Michael Daley – mixing assistance (track 15)
- Angela N. Golightly – production coordination (track 15)
- RedOne – production, vocal editing, recording, engineering (track 16)
- Johnny Severin – vocal editing, recording, engineering (track 16)
- Robert Orton – mixing (track 16)
- Deekay – production, mixing (track 17)
- Toby Gad – production, recording (track 18)
- Jay Reynolds – additional production (track 18); production (track 22); mixing (tracks 18, 22)
- James F. Reynolds – production, mixing (track 19); additional production, mix (track 20)
- Zach Hancock – extra vocal production (track 19)
- Chris Braide – production (track 20)
- Tim Debney – mastering (track 20)
- John Shanks – production (track 21)
- Jeff Rothschild – recording, mixing (track 21)
- Chris Barrett – additional recording (track 21)
- Shari Sutcliffe – contracted production coordination (track 21)
- Fred Ball – vocal production (track 22)

Artwork

- Sandrine Dulermo – photography
- Michael Labica – photography
- Tom Bird – creative direction
- Paul West – design
- Matt le Gallez – design assistance

== Charts ==
=== Weekly charts ===
Chart (2009)	Peak position
Australian Hitseekers Albums (ARIA)	8
Austrian Albums (Ö3 Austria)	70
Belgian Albums (Ultratop Flanders)	99
Belgian Albums (Ultratop Wallonia)	70
Danish Albums (Hitlisten)	16
Dutch Albums (Album Top 100)	92
European Albums (Billboard)	24
French Albums (SNEP)	60
German Albums (Offizielle Top 100)	81
Irish Albums (IRMA)	18
New Zealand Albums (RMNZ)	30
Scottish Albums (OCC)	7
Swiss Albums (Schweizer Hitparade)	49
UK Albums (OCC)	6

=== Year-end charts ===
Chart (2009)	Position
UK Albums (OCC)	53

Chart (2010)	Position
European Albums (Billboard)	50
UK Albums (OCC)	17

Chart (2011)	Position
UK Albums (OCC)	106

== Certifications ==
Region	Certification	Certified units/sales
United Kingdom (BPI)	3× Platinum	874,038

== Release history ==
Region	Date	Edition	Label	Ref(s)
Ireland	11 September 2009	Standard	Mercury	
Netherlands	11 September 2009	Standard	Universal	
Poland	11 September 2009	Standard	Universal	
Denmark	14 September 2009	Standard	Universal	
Portugal	14 September 2009	Standard	Universal	
United Kingdom	14 September 2009	Standard	Mercury	
Italy	18 September 2009	Standard	Universal	
Brazil	23 September 2009	Standard	Universal	
Belgium	25 September 2009	Standard	Universal	
Australia	2 October 2009	Standard	Universal	
Spain	6 October 2009	Standard	Universal	
France	26 October 2009	Standard	Universal	
Germany	30 October 2009	Standard	Universal	
United Kingdom	21 December 2009	Deluxe (iTunes)	Mercury	
France	18 October 2010	Turn It Up Louder	Universal	
United Kingdom	18 October 2010	Turn It Up Louder	Mercury	
Germany	7 December 2010	Turn It Up Louder	Universal	
Italy	6 January 2011	Turn It Up Louder	Universal	
