= Smoke (Lisa Lois album) =

Studio album by Lisa Lois
- Released: 27 November 2009
- Recorded: 2009
- Genres: Soul, pop, jazz
- Label: Sony BMG
- Producer: TMS

Lisa Lois chronology
Smoke (2009)	Breaking Away (2013)

Singles from Smoke
- 1. "Hallelujah" Released: 8 May 2009; 2. "No Good For Me" Released: 13 November 2009; 3. "Promises Promises" Released: 10 December 2009; 4. "Little By Little" Released: 29 May 2010

Smoke is the debut album by Dutch singer Lisa Lois. It was released on 27 November 2009 following Lois' victory on the Dutch version of X-Factor. The album was produced by London-based production group TMS. Songs have been written by notable songwriters such as Pixie Lott, Phill Tornalley and Jessie J.

The album debuted at 6 at the Dutch Albums Chart. It has so far peaked at 4 and has sold over 25,000 copies within the Netherlands.

== Background ==
Lois' website states that the singer's predilection for pop, soul and blues finds its way into the record in the form of "catchy horns" and a "warm, international sound". It also claims that Lois provided all her background vocals herself.

The album contains "powerful ballads" such as I Know Who I Am, as well as pop-influenced songs as No Good For Me. Lois decided to name the album after "one of her favorite tracks [on the album]", the song Smoke. She supports this decision saying: "I love Smoke, because it doesn't quite fit in. It's the odd one out. I think the tone, music and lyrics are very beautiful." Furthermore, she supports the album's laid-back overall tone, saying "I like blowing away people with my voice, but on this album I wanted to show I'm also able to sing quite modest, more like telling a story."

== Production ==
After gaining a number 1 spot in the Dutch charts with a cover of Leonard Cohen's Hallelujah, Lois moved from her hometown Wageningen to London, England to work on her debut album. She hired Tom Barnes, Peter Kelleher and Ben Kohn (production trio TMS) to produce her debut, commenting: "TMS is a brand that has not yet been established, like me. It feels good to work with such a small team, we became familiar soon enough. It was hard labour, but it got me a beautiful album and three new friends."

The albums' ten tracks were written by notable songwriters, such as Kerli, Pixie Lott, and Phil Tornalley, who has written for Natalie Imbruglia.

== Singles ==
Hallelujah

"Hallelujah" is the album's lead single. It went platinum and topped The Dutch Mega Single Top 100 and The Dutch Top 40. It was released on 8 May 2009. Two music videos have also been released; one supporting the original version, one the acoustic.

No Good for Me

"No Good for Me" is the second single of the album. It was released on 13 November 2009. In charts, it peaked at 26 on the Dutch Top 40 and lasted for 3 weeks. On The Dutch Single Top 100, it peaked at 4.

Promises Promises

"Promises Promises" was released into iTunes at 10 December 2009. The single was physically released in 2010 and was accompanied by a music video, which has received frequent play on Dutch television broadcast.

Little y Little

"Little by Little" is the fourth single from the album. She performed it on The Dutch X Factor.

== Track listing ==
No.	Title	Length
1.	"No Good For Me"	2:58
2.	"Little By Little"	3:14
3.	"I Know Who I Am"	3:36
4.	"Promises Promises"	3:21
5.	"Sophia"	3:35
6.	"Move"	2:55
7.	"Too Much Is Never Enough"	4:15
8.	"Owe It All To You (featuring Jessie J)"	3:46
9.	"Watching You"	3:37
10.	"Smoke"	3:59
11.	"Hallelujah Acoustic Version "	3:35

Bonus tracks
No.	Title	Length
12.	""Too Much Is Never Enough"" (Acoustic demo version)	4:05
13.	""It Ain't Right"" (iTunes pre-order bonus single)

== Charts ==
Chart	Position
Dutch Albums Top 100	4
