= Turn It Up (Pixie Lott song) =

2010 single by Pixie Lott

Single by Pixie Lott

from the album Turn It Up
- Released: 7 June 2010
- Recorded: 2009
- Genre: Synth-pop; R&B
- Length: 3:16
- Label: Mercury
- Songwriter(s): Pixie Lott; Ruth-Anne Cunningham; Jonas Jeberg; Mich Hansen
- Producer(s): Jonas Jeberg; Cutfather

Pixie Lott singles chronology
"Gravity" (2010)	"Turn It Up" (2010)	"Broken Arrow" (2010)

"Turn It Up" is a song by English singer Pixie Lott from her 2009 debut album of the same name. Written by Lott, Ruth-Anne Cunningham, Jonas Jeberg and Mich Hansen, the track was released as the album's fifth single on 7 June 2010. Lott performed the song on the third semi-final of the fourth series of Britain's Got Talent on 2 June 2010.

== Critical reception ==
Nick Levine of Digital Spy wrote: "While Danish duo Cutfather & Joe supply a suitably synthy pop-R&B backdrop—complete with singalong chorus—Lott gets down to the nitty-gritty of splitting up. 'I know you can't stay, so I won't be waiting, anticipating for the fall,' she sings, before trotting out that old chestnut about time being a healer. It's a terribly mature approach from one so young, but what else would you expect from a 19-year-old who already has a platinum album, a fashion line and a US film role to her name?" Fraser McAlpine of the BBC Chart Blog called the song "a perfectly good album track, notable only because at no point in the presentation does Pixie stop singing", but commented that "as a fifth single from an already-successful breakthrough album, it's pointless, and worse, might even allow chart-statisticians such as myself the chance to put together a compelling argument that she's failing, when she could be off recording some new, different, amazing songs and preparing to kill us all with brilliance."

== Music video ==
The music video for "Turn It Up" was directed by Nick Frew and filmed on 16 April 2010 in Downtown Los Angeles. It premiered on 6 May 2010.

The video is literal of the song's lyrics; it features Lott walking the back streets of Los Angeles whilst singing, before cutting to several different scenes on rooftops of Lott singing and dancing during sunrise and sunset. The theme of the song is how two lovers are trying to hold their relationship together, but it just is not working. After the frustration of it, they decide to end the drama and break up, wishing the best to one another and keeping good memories of their times together.

== Live performances ==
Lott promoted the song in several live performances, such as on the Main Stage of the Radio 1's Big Weekend in Bangor, Wales on 23 May 2010, the third semi-final of the fourth series of Britain's Got Talent on 2 June 2010, T4's Hollyoaks Music Show on 12 June 2010, the T4 on the Beach concert in Weston-super-Mare on 4 July 2010 and the Children in Need 2010 charity concert on 19 November 2010.

== Track listing ==
- Digital single – remix bundle
1. "Turn It Up" (Digital Dog Radio Edit) – 2:59
2. "Turn It Up" (Dee-Lux Club Remix Edit) – 2:56

== Personnel ==
- Pixie Lott – vocals
- Jonas Jeberg – production, all instruments
- Cutfather – production, percussion
- Phil Tan – mixing
- Carlos Oyanedel – additional mix engineering
- Tom Coyne – mastering

== Charts ==
=== Weekly charts ===
Weekly chart performance for "Turn It Up"
Chart (2010)	Peak position
European Hot 100 Singles (Billboard)	40
Ireland (IRMA)	20
Scotland (OCC)	9
UK Singles (OCC)	11

=== Year-end charts ===
Year-end chart performance for "Turn It Up"
Chart (2010)	Position
UK Singles (OCC)	147

== Certifications ==
Certifications for "Turn It Up"
Region	Certification	Certified units/sales
United Kingdom (BPI)	Silver	200,000^{‡}
^{‡} Sales+streaming figures based on certification alone.
