= Nasty (Pixie Lott song) =

2014 single by Pixie Lott

Single by Pixie Lott

from the album Pixie Lott
- Released: 7 March 2014
- Recorded: June 2013
- Studio: Venice House (Miami, Florida)
- Genre: Pop; R&B; funk
- Length: 2:46
- Label: Mercury
- Songwriters: Jack Splash; Thomas Callaway; Claude Kelly; Harry Casey; Richard Finch; Billy Nichols; James Brown
- Producer: Jack Splash

Pixie Lott singles chronology
"Bright Lights" (2012)	"Nasty" (2014)	"Lay Me Down" (2014)

"Nasty" is a song by English singer Pixie Lott from her self-titled third studio album (2014). It was released on 7 March 2014 as the album's lead single by Mercury Records. The accompanying music video was filmed in November 2013 and directed by Bryan Barber. A second version featuring British band the Vamps was released the same day in the United Kingdom and Ireland.

"Nasty" was previously recorded by American singer Christina Aguilera in collaboration with CeeLo Green for inclusion on the soundtrack to the 2010 film Burlesque, which stars Aguilera and Cher, but it was ultimately scrapped from the official track listing due to legal issues concerning sample clearance.

== Background ==
"Nasty" was previously recorded by several artists, including Christina Aguilera, who recorded the song as a duet with CeeLo Green for her debut film project Burlesque (2010). However, their version did not make the final track listing due to legal issues concerning sample clearance. After Lott's legal team managed to clear all of the song's samples, the singer recorded her own version of the song and released it as the first single from her self-titled third studio album. In an interview with Metro, Lott explained, "A few other singers had recorded it and Christina was one of them so everyone wanted this song. When I heard other singers had done it I thought 'I need to get this!' It was a difficult song to get because there are so many old-school samples on it, like James Brown, that are hard to clear copyright on. But I got it and now it is my new single."

== Commercial performance ==
"Nasty" debuted on the UK Singles Chart at number nine, selling 30,812 copies in its first week.

== Music videos ==
The music video was filmed in London in November 2013 and was directed by Bryan Barber. The video premiered on 15 January 2014. The video, starring Lott, sees her approach a man in a bar, and as she is attracted to him, she strips down to her bra and skirt and they dance together seductively.

A music video for the version of the song featuring the Vamps was directed by Dean Sherwood and released on 4 February 2014.

== Track listings ==
- Digital download
1. "Nasty" – 2:46
- Digital download (featuring the Vamps)
1. "Nasty" (featuring the Vamps) – 2:47
- iTunes EP
1. "Nasty" – 2:46
2. "When You Were My Man" (live at The Pool/2013) – 3:53
3. "Wake Me Up" (live at The Pool/2013) – 2:47
4. "(Your Love Keeps Lifting Me) Higher and Higher" – 3:26
- Amazon MP3 and 7digital EP
1. "Nasty" – 2:46
2. "When You Were My Man" (live at The Pool/2013) – 3:53
3. "Royals" (live at The Pool/2013) – 3:37
4. "(Your Love Keeps Lifting Me) Higher and Higher" – 3:26
- UK CD single
1. "Nasty" – 2:46
2. "The Point of No Return" – 3:13
3. "Cry to Me" (live at The Pool/2013) – 3:15
4. "Nasty" (Mike Mago remix) – 5:35

== Credits and personnel ==
Credits adapted from the liner notes of the "Nasty" CD single.

- Pixie Lott – vocals
- Michael Duke – additional vocals
- Stuart Hawkes – mastering engineering
- Long Island – mixing
- Jay Reynolds – additional drum programming
- Jack Splash – arrangement, drums, engineering, production, keyboards, percussion

== Charts ==
Chart (2014)	Peak position
Ireland (IRMA)	43
Scottish Singles Sales (Official Charts)	8
UK Singles (Official Charts)	9

== Release history ==
Region	Date	Format	Version	Label	Ref.
United Kingdom	6 March 2014	Digital download	Solo; featuring the Vamps	Mercury	
Australia	7 March 2014	Digital download	Solo	Universal	
Ireland	7 March 2014	Digital download	Solo; featuring the Vamps	Mercury	
United Kingdom	10 March 2014	CD single	Solo	Virgin EMI	
Germany	14 March 2014	Digital download	Solo	Universal	

== See also ==
- List of UK top-ten singles in 2014
