= Pixie Lott =

English singer (born 1991)

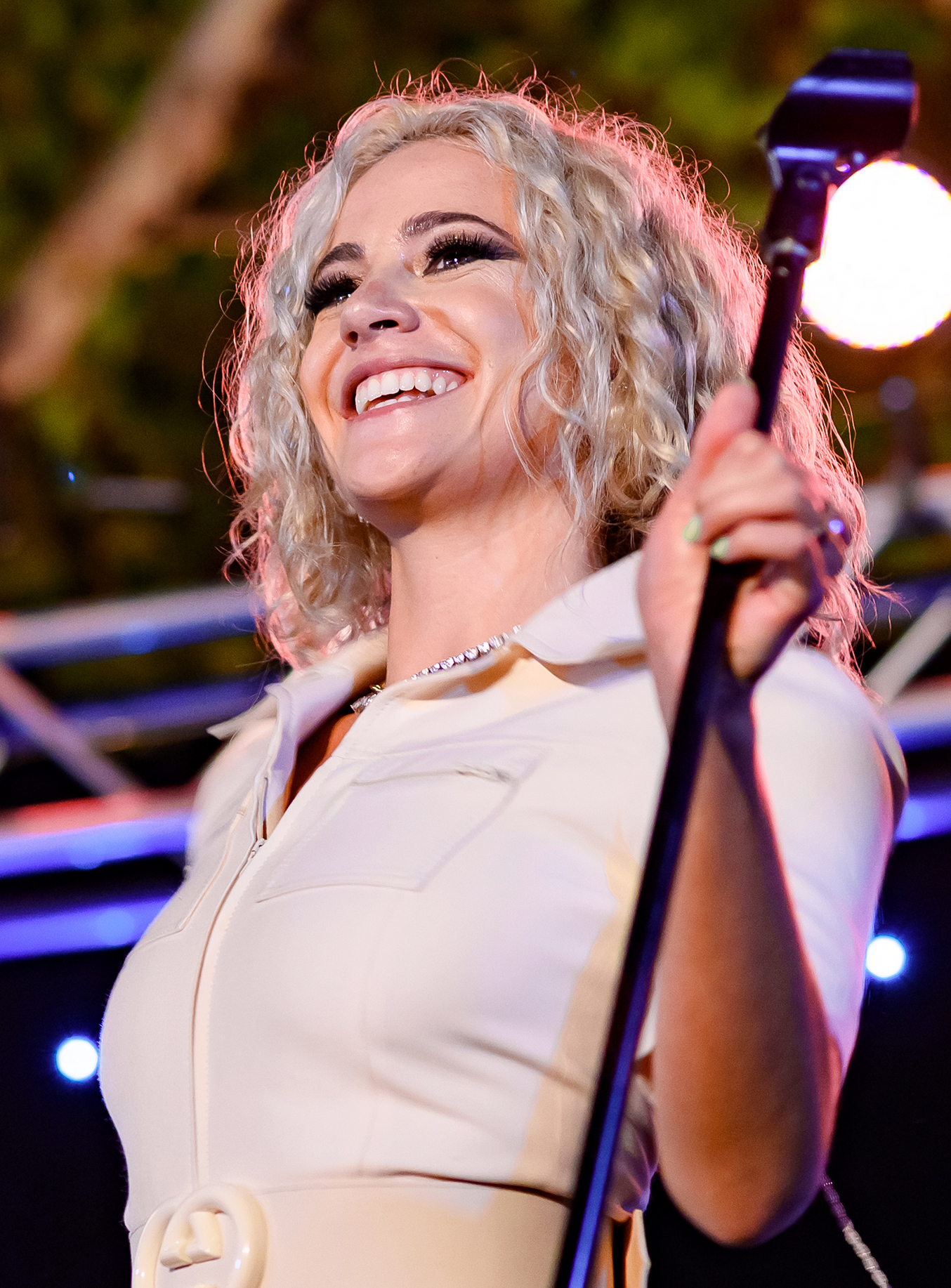
- Lott performing in 2019
- Born: Victoria Louise Lott; 12 January 1991 (age 35); Bromley, Greater London, England
- Education: Italia Conti Academy of Theatre Arts
- Occupations: Singer; songwriter; actress
- Years active: 2005–present
- Spouse: Oliver Cheshire (m. 2022)
- Children: 2
- Awards: Full list
- Musical career
- Genres: Pop; R&B; soul
- Instruments: Vocals, guitar
- Labels: Mercury; Virgin EMI

Victoria Louise "Pixie" Lott (born 12 January 1991) is an English singer, songwriter, and actress. Her debut studio album, Turn It Up (2009), reached number six on the UK Albums Chart and sold over 1.5 million copies. It also spawned six consecutive top twenty singles on the UK singles chart, including two number-one singles, "Mama Do (Uh Oh, Uh Oh)" and "Boys and Girls".

Lott's second studio album, Young Foolish Happy (2011), spawned the UK number-one hit "All About Tonight", as well as the top ten singles "What Do You Take Me For?" and "Kiss the Stars". Her self-titled third studio album, released in 2014, had the lead single "Nasty", which peaked at number nine on the UK singles chart, making it her sixth Top 10 single in the United Kingdom.

Lott has also occasionally acted in film, television and stage, including starring in the UK production of the Richard Greenberg play Breakfast at Tiffany's in 2016. She made her acting debut in the 2010 Nickelodeon film Fred: The Movie. From 2017 to 2023, she was featured as a coach on the children's singing competition The Voice Kids UK.

== Early life ==
Victoria Louise Lott was born in the Bromley area of Greater London on 12 January 1991, the third child of Beverley (née Martin) and stockbroker Stephen Lott. The family moved around the London suburbs, initially living in Petts Wood and then Bickley. Lott was born several weeks premature, and her mother gave her the nickname Pixie because she was "such a tiny, cute baby who looked like a fairy".

She started singing in her church school, and attended the Italia Conti Associates Saturday school in Chislehurst when she was five years old. At the age of 11, she was awarded a scholarship and went on to attend its main school, the Italia Conti Academy of Theatre Arts. At the age of 13, Lott moved with her family to Brentwood in Essex where she attended Brentwood County High School. She appeared in a West End production of Chitty Chitty Bang Bang at the London Palladium and as Louisa von Trapp in BBC One's Celebrate the Sound of Music in 2005, aged 14. Despite missing school time because she was recording her album, Lott says she received top marks in her GCSEs.

== Career ==
=== 2008–2010: Turn It Up ===
In 2006, at the age of 15, Lott sang for L. A. Reid after he heard a few of her demos. He then signed her to the Island Def Jam Music Group. After a change of managers, a bidding war ensued and Lott parted ways with the Island Def Jam Music Group, to sign with Mercury Records in the UK and to Interscope Records in the U.S. Lott signed a publishing deal, as a songwriter, with Sony/ATV Music Publishing in December 2007, while writing and recording tracks for Turn It Up. Lott wrote a song for Alexandra Burke's debut album, Overcome (2009), titled "You Broke My Heart" and a song for Girls Can't Catch titled "Happy Alone". She also wrote two tracks on Lisa Lois's (the Dutch X Factor winner) debut album Smoke (2009), titled "No Good For Me" and "Promises, Promises". She also wrote 'We Own the Night' with Toby Gad for Selena Gomez and ended up featuring on the track too for Gomez' album When the Sun Goes Down. Lott played her first festival concert in the Big Top at the Isle of Wight Festival 2009, during her first full British tour, where she supported The Saturdays on The Work Tour.

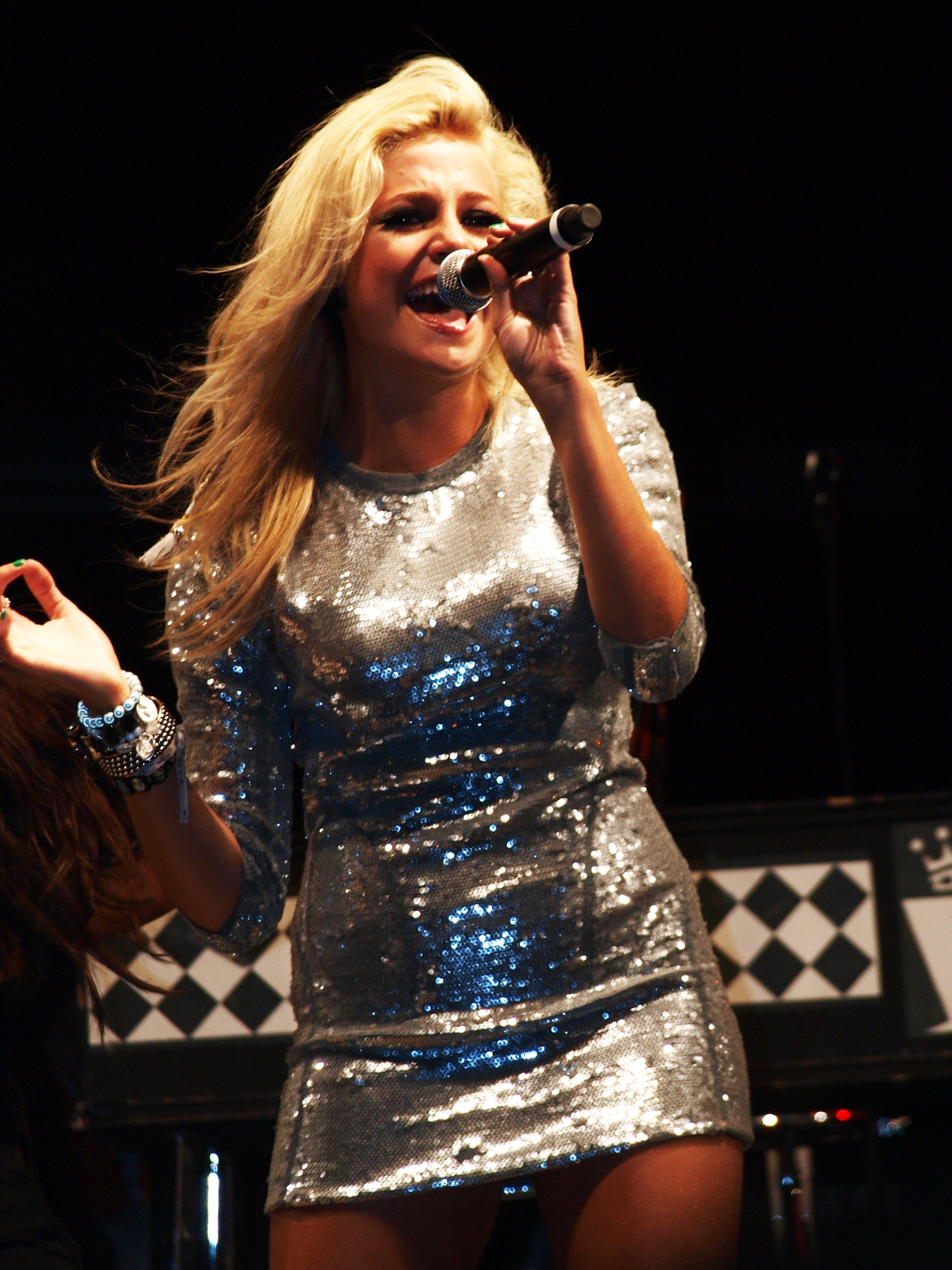
Lott performing at Blackpool Pleasure Beach, 4 September 2009.

Lott's debut single, "Mama Do", was released on 8 June 2009. It spent one week at number one, 11 weeks within the top 40 and 18 weeks within the top 75. The single was also successful outside the UK, reaching the top 40 in 11 other countries, including top ten peaks of number eight in Denmark and number 10 in France. The single was certified silver by the British Phonographic Industry on 28 August 2009 after selling over 200,000 copies in the United Kingdom.

On 15 August 2009, Lott was featured alongside Hoobastank, The All-American Rejects, Kasabian, Boys Like Girls, Estranged and Raygun as one of the live acts at Asia's very first MTV World Stage Live in Malaysia concert. Lott's second lead single "Boys and Girls" was released on 6 September 2009 and topped the UK Singles Chart on 13 September. On 14 September, Lott's debut album, Turn It Up was released. This followed an intensive promotional tour where Lott visited the Asia-Pacific region to promote the album and 'Mama Do'. The album debuted at number six on the UK Album Chart, and sold over 600,000 copies in the United Kingdom. In August 2010, it was certified Double-Platinum by the British Phonographic Industry. Lott's third single from the album, "Cry Me Out" was released on 23 November 2009. It was during this time that Lott was chosen as the face of Nokia's "Illuvial Pink Collection" mobile phone range and Casio's range of Baby G watches.

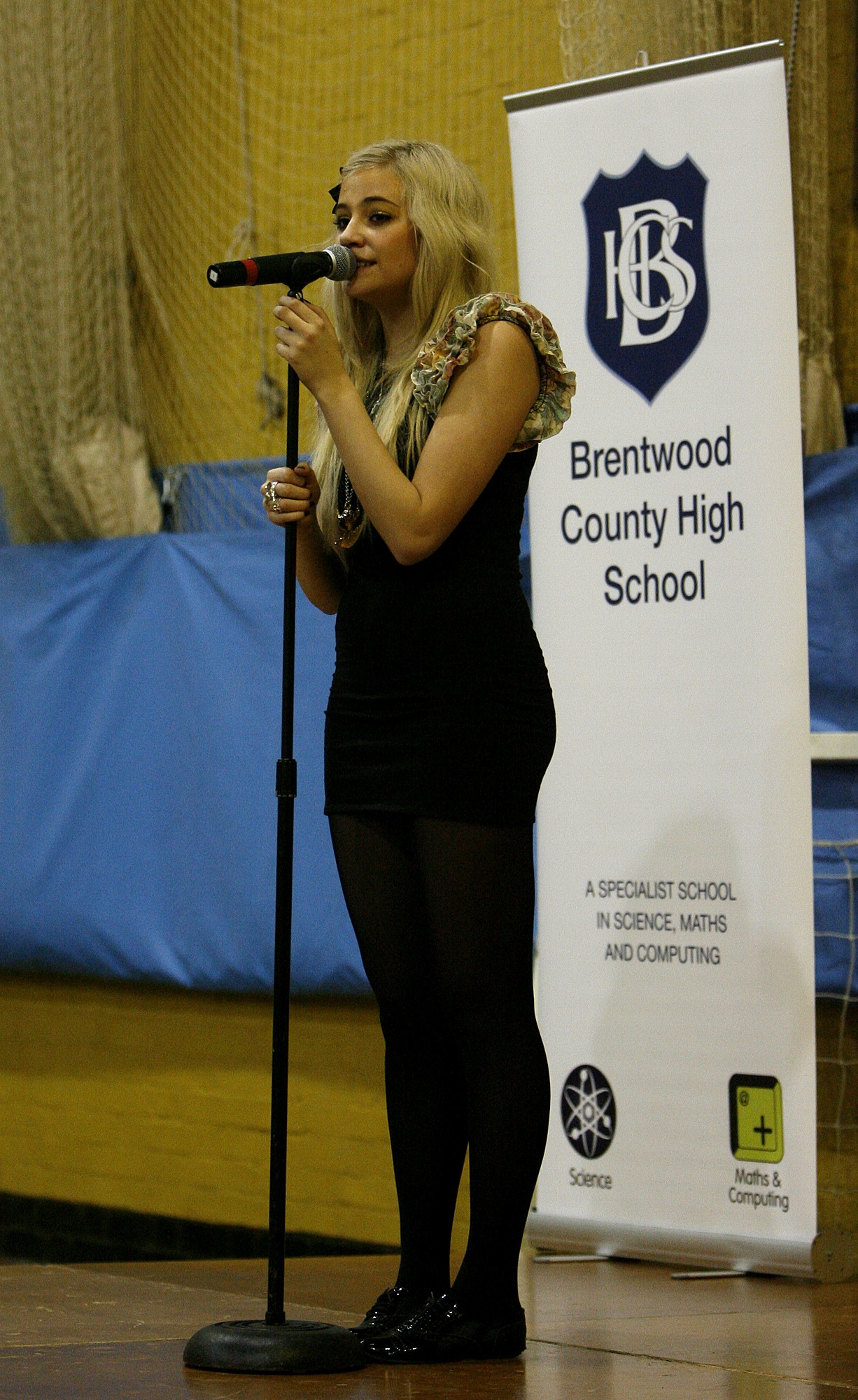
Lott performing at Brentwood County High School in 2010.

The fourth single, "Gravity", was released in the UK on 8 March 2010. Lott won two MTV EMA Awards at the MTV Europe Music Awards 2009 ceremony, Best UK & Ireland Act and Best Push Artist (best break through artist). Lott was nominated for British Breakthrough Act, British Female Solo Artist and British Single at the 2010 BRIT Awards. Lott also served as the opening act of Rihanna's Last Girl on Earth Tour in the UK 7–26 May 2010.

In April 2010, Lipsy launched a fashion range co-designed by Lott. The first Pixie Collection comprised two ranges: Pixie Festival and Pixie Party. Lott's second collection for Lipsy was launched in September 2010 and consisted of a new range, Pixie Rocks, and an updated Pixie Party collection. In July 2010, Lott appeared as a guest judge for the auditions for the seventh series of The X Factor in Cardiff, covering for Dannii Minogue, who was on maternity leave. Lott also performed on the main stage at the V Festival in August 2010. The fifth single from Lott's album, the title song "Turn It Up", was released on 7 June 2010. Lott recorded a song for the film Street Dance 3D, "Live For The Moment".

Lott released "Boys and Girls" as her debut US single on 24 August 2010. The release coincided with the TV premiere of her film debut, Fred: The Movie. In January 2010, Lott was named one of 2010's "Faces to Watch" by US magazine, Billboard. Lott was cast as Judy, Fred Figglehorn's crush, in the film Fred: The Movie, starring alongside Lucas Cruikshank. The comedy was released on America's Nickelodeon channel on 18 September 2010. Turn It Up was to be released in the US in 2011, but this never materialised. It was, however, re-released in the UK. "The Way The World Works", from Lott's debut record was used in the U.S.-produced medical drama Private Practice.

For the new repackaged version of Turn It Up, Lott recorded duets with Jason Derulo and Joe Jonas, though the latter failed to make the final track listing for the album. This edition included her single, "Broken Arrow".

=== 2011–2012: Young Foolish Happy ===
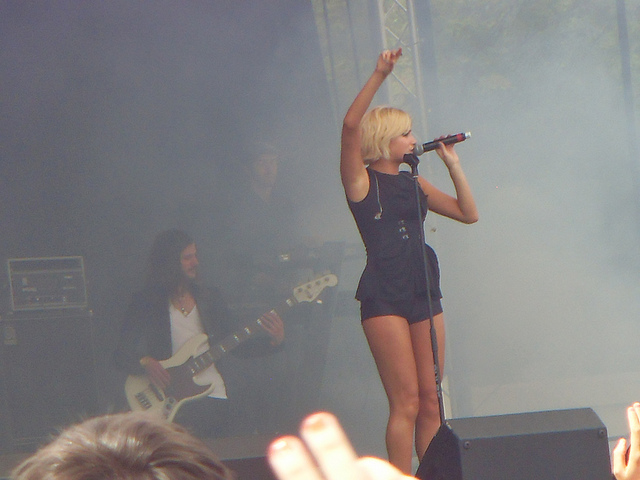
Lott performing "All About Tonight" at Hanley Park Festival in Stoke-on-Trent, England.

In July 2011, Lott signed a deal with Select Model Management. The company is also responsible for signing Cher Lloyd, Agyness Deyn and David Gandy. Lott's second album, Young Foolish Happy was released on 14 November 2011, it includes collaborations with Stevie Wonder and John Legend. Young Foolish Happy debuted at number eighteen on the UK Albums Chart, selling 18,503 copies in its opening week. The following week, it dropped twenty-four places to number forty-two. On 10 February 2012, it was certified gold by the British Phonographic Industry (BPI), denoting shipments in excess of 100,000 within the UK. The album also entered the Irish Albums Chart at number thirty-three.

"All About Tonight" was released on 2 September 2011 as the album's lead single. Lott premiered the song on BBC Radio 1's The Chris Moyles Show on 11 July 2011. It debuted at number one on the UK Singles Chart with first-week sales of 88,893 copies (the highest of Lott's career), giving Lott her third UK number one. It also reached number nine on the Irish Singles Chart, her second top ten hit in that country. The second single "What Do You Take Me For?", featuring rapper Pusha T, was released on 4 November 2011, while the music video premiered on 6 October. It debuted at number ten on the UK Singles Chart, selling 34,335 copies.

In July 2012, Lott performed "Kiss the Stars" and "Use Somebody" at the Men's Gymnastics Finals in the 2012 Summer Olympics. Lott also performed at V Festival (her second performance after appearing in 2010) and at the "Access All Eirias" festival in North Wales. She also performed 'Kiss The Stars' on Dancing on Ice in 2012 and the MTV "Titanic Sounds" festival in Belfast.

=== 2012–2015: Pixie Lott and Strictly Come Dancing ===
In June 2012, Lott stated she had started recording her third album citing Motown as inspiration for the album: "I'm going to be heading to New York to work with the guys who did the original Motown records in the '60s to make a new album soon." In June 2013, Lott tweeted that she was recording the first single from her third album with Jack Splash in Miami. In September, Splash confirmed that the single had been mixed. On 17 July 2013, Lott tweeted that she was on her way to a photo shoot for her new single and her third studio album.

On 1 November 2013, Lott trended on Twitter after announcing that her new music was "coming soon", and posting a cover of Avicii's "Wake Me Up" on YouTube. On 8 November, Lott's cover of "Royals" by New Zealand singer-songwriter Lorde was uploaded. "Royals" was chosen because Lorde had previously covered Lott's number one single, "Mama Do". On 2 December 2013, Lott announced during a Google Hangout with Dan Wootton of The Sun that the lead single from her third album, "Nasty", would premiere in January. She also revealed the artwork for the album, titled Pixie Lott. Lott featured in the accompanying music video for "Nasty", which was originally recorded by Christina Aguilera as a duet with Cee Lo Green for the 2010 film Burlesque but was never released.

In March 2014, Lott took part in recording England's 2014 World Cup song. She collaborated with the likes of fellow pop stars Melanie C, Eliza Doolittle, Emma Bunton, Conor Maynard, Kimberley Walsh and Katy B, on "Greatest Day", a track originally performed by British band, Take That. The track was produced by Gary Barlow and recorded at Sarm Studios in London. The track also featured past footballers such as Gary Lineker, Michael Owen, Geoff Hurst, David Seaman, Peter Shilton, Glenn Hoddle and Dion Dublin on backing vocals.

"Nasty" (produced by Jack Splash) was released on 7 March 2014 and debuted on the UK Singles Chart at number nine, selling 30,812 copies in its first week. It became Lott's sixth Top 10 single and tenth consecutive Top 20 single. On 19 June 2014, Lott appeared on BBC Radio 1's Innuendo Bingo. Her self-titled third studio album was released on 1 August 2014 and was preceded by its second single, "Lay Me Down" released on 27 July 2014. Promotional single, "Heart Cry" has been also released. Pixie Lott peaked at number 15 on the UK Albums Chart.

In August 2014, Lott was confirmed as one of the fifteen contestants, participating on the twelfth series of Strictly Come Dancing. On the launch show, it was announced that she would be partnered up with Australian professional dancer Trent Whiddon. Despite topping the leaderboard four times and having the highest average of the series, Lott & Whiddon were eliminated during the quarter-finals on Week 11, after losing the dance-off to Blue singer Simon Webbe and his partner, Kristina Rihanoff. It was announced that Lott would release her first greatest hits album on 24 November 2014, called Platinum Pixie: Hits. The album was preceded by the single "Caravan of Love", a cover of the Isley-Jasper-Isley's 1985 hit. The compilation also includes all her singles, with the exception of "What Do You Take Me For?" and "Lay Me Down". Lott then starred in "Puttin’ On The Ritz" UK Tour, for the dates in Wimbledon and Newcastle. She was joined on stage by her dance partner, Trent Whiddon, in 2015.

=== 2016–present: Stage and television work ===
From 30 June to 17 September 2016, Lott starred as Holly Golightly in a limited 12-week season of Breakfast at Tiffany’s at the Theatre Royal Haymarket in London's West End. On 15 November 2016, it was announced Lott will be a coach on The Voice Kids UK alongside will.i.am & Danny Jones. The show began in June 2017 on ITV. On 31 March 2017 Lott collaborated with British DJ Anton Powers on their single "Baby". Lott released her new single "Won't Forget You" featuring Stylo G on 29 September 2017.

Lott performed at the 10th-anniversary concert of the Made in Dagenham musical at the London Palladium in March 2024.

She returned in April 2026 with the single "Good Wife". She is currently starring as Marilyn Monroe in the play Who Killed Marilyn?.

== Musical influences ==
Lott has cited Celine Dion, Christina Aguilera, Mariah Carey, Whitney Houston and Beyoncé as major influences on her style of singing. For her second album, Lott told Digital Spy that the sound was "a little more soulful. That's the kind of thing that I'm into. That influence is stronger on this album."

== Personal life ==
Lott began a relationship with fashion model Oliver Cheshire in 2010. They were engaged on 13 November 2016. They were married at Ely Cathedral on 6 June 2022, following a delay due to COVID-19. They had their first son in November 2023, Albert Charles; and their second son in October 2025.

Lott is a patron of the Penny for London charity and is a supporter of West Ham United.

== Filmography ==
=== Film ===
Year	Title	Role	Notes
2010	Fred: The Movie	Judy	
2011	The Itch of the Golden Nit	Angela (voice)	Short film
2025	Christmas Karma	Mary Cratchit	
TBA	That's Just Me		Short film

=== Television ===
Year	Title	Role	Notes
2007	Genie in the House	Kaya	Episodes: "I Feel Like Singing" and "Drama Queen"
2010	The X Factor	Guest judge	Episode: "Auditions - Part 5"
2012	Sadie J	Herself	Episode: "Pixiepopalistic: Part 2"
2014	Inspector George Gently	Megan Webb	Episode: "Blue for Bluebird"
2014	Strictly Come Dancing	Contestant	Series 12
2017	The Playlist	Guest presenter	Episode: "22 April"
2017–2023	The Voice Kids UK	Coach	7 series
2024	McDonald & Dodds	Lola Baker	Episode: "The Rule of Three"

== Stage ==
Year	Title	Role
2016	Breakfast at Tiffany's	Holly Golightly

== Discography ==
- Turn It Up (2009)
- Young Foolish Happy (2011)
- Pixie Lott (2014)
- Encino (2024)

== Tours ==
As headline act

- The Crazycats Tour (2010–2011)
- Live in Concert (2014)

As opening act

- The Work Tour – The Saturdays (2009)
- Last Girl on Earth – Rihanna (2010)
