= Gravity (Pixie Lott song) =

2010 single by Pixie Lott

Single by Pixie Lott

from the album Turn It Up
- Released: 8 March 2010
- Recorded: 2009
- Genre: Pop; R&B
- Length: 3:35
- Label: Mercury
- Songwriters: Ina Wroldsen; Jonas Jeberg; Mich Hansen; Lucas Secon
- Producers: Jonas Jeberg; Cutfather

Pixie Lott singles chronology
"Cry Me Out" (2009)	"Gravity" (2010)	"Turn It Up" (2010)

Music video
- "Gravity" on YouTube

"Gravity" is a song by English singer Pixie Lott from her debut album, Turn It Up (2009). Written by Ina Wroldsen, Jonas Jeberg, Mich Hansen and Lucas Secon, the song was released as the album's fourth single on 8 March 2010.

== Background and writing ==
"Gravity" was co-penned by Norwegian songwriter Ina Wroldsen (responsible for many of The Saturdays' hits), the Danish duo Jonas Jeberg and Cutfather (Kylie Minogue, Pussycat Dolls) and Danish-American songwriter and producer Lucas Secon (who has worked with the Pussycat Dolls, Sugababes and Sean Kingston, amongst others).

== Critical reception ==
"Gravity" received mixed to positive reviews from music critics. Fraser McAlpine of the BBC Chart Blog gave the song a mixed review, stating that "there's a big problem with this song, one which it will take more than an impassioned delivery and immaculate production to get around." He also compared the song to "No Air" by American singer Jordin Sparks. Nevertheless, while reviewing Turn It Up, Digital Spy music editor Nick Levine referred to the track as one of the album's highlights.

== Chart performance ==
"Gravity" entered the UK Singles Chart at number seventy-three on the issued dated 14 February 2010. The following week, the single climbed to number Sixty-Eight. On 28 February, it climbed another two positions to number sixty-six on the UK Singles Chart, finally reaching a peak position of number twenty.

== Music video ==
The music video for the song, directed by Nick Frew, was shot in January 2010 and premiered on 6 February 2010 on Channel 4 in the UK. It features Lott and two backup dancers performing a contemporary routine in black tutus, Lott standing on a platform in a burlesque-inspired outfit (with a black-feathered dress, thigh high boots and brunette bob, with a red circle behind her) and also performing an aerial silk routine in a red catsuit. Lott is also seen singing while lying down against a mirrored surface, giving the impression she is floating in air.

On making the video for "Gravity", Frew stated:

Gravity was about unfussy elegance. I wasn't interested in show-stopping special effects and clever clever post—just simple in camera techniques addressing the concept. So long as Pixie looked stunning I was happy—It was liberating, for once, to put beauty first.

The best part? For the red dot set-up, I wanted Pixie stock still, looking utterly sensational. Michelle Kelly did me proud with this massive, feathery, one-off Kristian Aadnevik showpiece. As soon as Pixie appeared wearing it with her black wig, there was a real buzz on set. Karen Alder (make up artist) did an amazing job on Pixie's jewel encrusted eyes – I love the way she works.

Under Eric Maddison's lights, swinging her dress around her, Pixie had the whole crew gathered round the monitor, cooing. It was incredibly satisfying.

== Track listing ==
- UK iTunes remix single
1. "Gravity" (Cahill Club Mix) – 5:14
2. "Gravity" (Den Haan Remix) – 5:03

== Personnel ==
- Pixie Lott – vocals
- Nick Barr – viola
- Natalia Bonner – violin
- Ian Burdge – cello
- Tom Coyne – mastering
- Cutfather – producer, percussion
- Daniel Davidsen – guitar
- Calina de la Mare – violin
- Sophie Harris – cello
- Mo Hausler – string engineer
- Sally Herbert – string arrangements, string conductor
- Jonas Jeberg – producer, instrumentation
- Rick Koster – violin
- Claire Orsler – viola
- Carlos Oyanedel – additional mixing
- Emlyn Singleton – violin
- Julia Singleton – violin
- Phil Tan – mixing
- Bruce White – viola
- Brian Wright – violin
- Ina Wroldsen – backing vocals
- Warren Zielinski – violin

== Charts ==
Chart (2010)	Peak position
European Hot 100 Singles (Billboard)	57
Ireland (IRMA)	42
Scotland Singles (OCC)	19
UK Singles (OCC)	20
