= Broken Arrow (Pixie Lott song) =

2010 single by Pixie Lott

Single by Pixie Lott

from the album Turn It Up Louder
- Released: 10 October 2010
- Recorded: 2010
- Genre: Pop; R&B
- Length: 3:39
- Label: Mercury
- Songwriters: Pixie Lott; Ruth-Anne Cunningham; Toby Gad
- Producer: Toby Gad

Pixie Lott singles chronology
"Turn It Up" (2010)	"Broken Arrow" (2010)	"All About Tonight" (2011)

"Broken Arrow" is a song by English recording artist Pixie Lott from the re-release of her debut album, Turn It Up Louder (2010). Written by Lott, Ruth-Anne Cunningham and Toby Gad, the track was released on 10 October 2010 as the lead single from the re-release, reaching number 12 on the UK Singles Chart. An acoustic version of the song, available as a B-side to the single, was uploaded onto YouTube a week prior to the single's release. "Broken Arrow" was used in the trailer for the 2011 film Beastly, as well as in its end credits.

== Background and release ==
"Broken Arrow" is the lead single from the re-released version of her debut album, Turn It Up. The song was premiered on 24 August 2010 on BBC Radio One. It was written by Lott, Ruth-Anne Cunningham and co-written and produced by New York based songwriter/producer Toby Gad, who also penned Beyoncé's "If I Were a Boy" and Fergie's "Big Girls Don't Cry." It is a pop ballad, with elements of R&B and it talks about not getting over an ex-boyfriend, even with another person, because she still has feelings for him.

== Critical reception ==
The song received positive reviews from music critics. Nina Baniamer from Contact Music called it "a beautiful and tragic song. Haunting and yeaning, it is great to see unique emotion conveyed within the lyrics, rather than generic pop romantic clichés." In a review for Digital Spy, Robert Copsey referred to "Broken Arrow" as "an autumnal midtempo number on which Pix sings about struggling to get over an ex", but felt that the lyrics "make for a predictably slushy affair, and the chorus doesn't quite have the instant impact of her best tunes." Newsround noted that the song "isn't the catchiest of tunes but it will definitely grow on you". It also described the track as a "stormy heart-wrenching song", complemented by Lott's "powerful" vocals. Gerard McGarry from Unreality Shout agreed, calling the song "[e]normously radio-friendly but with muted hooks that aren't immediately catchy, but they add up over time." Priya Elan of The Guardian commented that "On Broken Arrow she's Alicia Keys but without, you know, the keys."

== Music video ==
The music video for "Broken Arrow" was directed by Greg Masuak and filmed in North East London. Masuak described the shoot as "mental but fun: one single day for a bunch of different performances that included several costume and makeup changes, a narrative with Pixie and two different guys, a series of dance routines, and a cluster of different scenarios." The video features product placement in the form of the Citroën DS3, marking the first instance of vehicle product placement in a music video in the United Kingdom. It premiered on Lott's official YouTube/Vevo account on 16 September 2010.

Model Alex Watson, brother of Harry Potter star Emma Watson, plays one of Lott's love interests in the video.

== Track listings ==
- UK CD single
1. "Broken Arrow"
2. "Broken Arrow" (Acoustic Version)
- iTunes EP
1. "Broken Arrow" – 3:39
2. "Broken Arrow" (Paul Harris Vocal) – 6:37
3. "Broken Arrow" (Paul Harris Dub) – 6:24
4. "Broken Arrow" (Acoustic Version) – 3:48
5. "Broken Arrow" (Shapeshifters Remix) – 6:07

== Personnel ==
- Pixie Lott – vocals, backing vocals
- Toby Gad – producer, instrumentation, arranger, engineer
- Mark Pusey – drums
- Jay Reynolds – additional producer, programming, mixing
- Oliver Weeks – keyboards

== Charts ==
Chart (2010)	Peak position
European Hot 100 Singles (Billboard)	40
Ireland (IRMA)	30
Scotland Singles (OCC)	10
UK Singles (OCC)	12
