= Cry Me Out =

2009 single by Pixie Lott

Single by Pixie Lott

from the album Turn It Up
- Released: 22 November 2009
- Recorded: 2009
- Genre: Pop; soul
- Length: 4:04
- Label: Mercury
- Songwriter(s): Pixie Lott; Mads Hauge; Phil Thornalley; Colin Campsie
- Producer(s): Mads Hauge; Phil Thornalley

Pixie Lott singles chronology
"I Got Soul" (2009)	"Cry Me Out" (2009)	"Gravity" (2010)

"Cry Me Out" is a song by English singer Pixie Lott from her debut studio album, Turn It Up (2009). Written by Lott, Mads Hauge, Phil Thornalley and Colin Campsie, and produced by Hauge and Thornalley, the song was released on 22 November 2009 as the album's third single. "Cry Me Out" peaked at number 12 on the UK Singles Chart.

== Background ==
Lott explained the song to BBC News: "I always prefer to write songs about emotional situations and heartbreak [...] because I like getting into the character. When we were writing 'Cry Me Out', I said, 'I feel like singing about something sad but, obviously, still being strong'. So the guy has to cry to get over me, instead of the other way around." She also told Digital Spy that the song's opening lyric "I got your e-mails, you just don't get females" was her favourite line on the Turn It Up album. Lott explained that she chose to release "Cry Me Out" as a single because she "wanted to do something really classy and mature for the next single, where I could get a bit more emotional."

== Critical reception ==
"Cry Me Out" received positive reviews from music critics. BBC Music's Paul Lester called the song "a superb ballad, as affecting as it is accomplished" and described its opening line as "witty and wise, a master class in how to put contemporary language to the service of a sublime melody." Digital Spy reviewer David Balls viewed the song as "a sultry, soulful affair that warms the cockles like a cup of cocoa on a cold winter's night", adding that "Lott's vocals have a rich and smoky tone beyond her years." Jack Foley of IndieLondon wrote that the song "taps into the clever songwriting tendencies her PR insists she has with some cheeky lyrics and a keen sense of beat and melody." The LINC Online referred to the track as "a decidedly retro-sounding gem of tune heading more in the direction of the epic ballad than her previous singles may suggest".

== Commercial performance ==
Following the release of Turn It Up, "Cry Me Out" debuted on the UK Singles Chart at number 117 for the week of 20 September 2009. The song peaked at number 12 on 6 December 2009, becoming Lott's first single not to reach number one and to miss the top 10 completely. On 26 February 2021, it was certified gold by the British Phonographic Industry (BPI). The single also debuted and peaked at number 31 on the Irish Singles Chart on 10 December 2009. "Cry Me Out" peaked at number four on the Danish Singles Chart on 14 January 2011, after being performed during the auditions of the fourth season of the Danish version of X Factor.

== Music video ==
The black-and-white music video for "Cry Me Out" was directed by Jake Nava and filmed in Cuba. It premiered on 30 October 2009. The video opens with a close-up of a man crying, as Lott walks down a staircase in a classic-styled home wearing a black dress before sitting down at a mirror. She proceeds to dance ballet in a gothic-like dress in an empty room, intercut with scenes of her lying down on a lengthy dining table surrounded by men. Lott is seen walking through a hallway in the house as several other ballerinas dance around her. During the final chorus, Lott is sitting by a swimming pool where six dancers perform a synchronised swimming routine. The video ends with the same crying man as in the beginning, before returning to the shot of Lott at the mirror before she walks away.

== Track listing ==
- Digital EP – remix bundle
1. "Cry Me Out" – 4:04
2. "Cry Me Out" (Bimbo Jones Remix Edit) – 3:28
3. "Cry Me Out" (Bimbo Jones Remix) – 6:28
4. "Cry Me Out" (Desert Eagle Discs Remix) – 6:00

== Credits and personnel ==
Credits adapted from the liner notes of Turn It Up.

- Pixie Lott – lead vocals, backing vocals, songwriting
- Ian Burdge – cello
- Colin Campsie – songwriting
- Tom Coyne – mastering
- Calina de la Mare – violin
- Clare Finnimore – viola
- Richard George – violin
- Jon Green – guitar, piano
- Mads Hauge – backing vocals, bass, guitar, Pro Tools editing, production, recording engineering, songwriter
- Sally Herbert – string arrangements, string conducting
- Rick Koster – violin
- Graham Linehy – string recording
- Everton Nelson – violin
- Jackie Norrie – violin
- Claire Orsler – viola
- Carlos Oyanedel – additional mix engineering
- Chris Sansom – additional engineering
- Emlyn Singleton – violin
- Julia Singleton – violin
- Phil Tan – mixing
- David Tench – Wurlitzer
- Phil Thornalley – glockenspiel, production, songwriting
- Bruce White – viola
- Chris Worsey – cello

== Charts ==
=== Weekly charts ===
Chart (2009–2011)	Peak position
Denmark (Tracklisten)	4
European Hot 100 Singles (Billboard)	38
Ireland (IRMA)	31
Scotland (OCC)	13
Slovakia (Rádio Top 100)	58
Spain (PROMUSICAE)	40
Switzerland (Schweizer Hitparade)	66
UK Singles (OCC)	12

=== Year-end charts ===
Chart (2009)	Position
UK Singles (OCC)	121
Chart (2010)	Position
UK Singles (OCC)	144

== Certifications ==
Region	Certification	Certified units/sales
United Kingdom (BPI)	Gold	400,000^{‡}
^{‡} Sales+streaming figures based on certification alone.
