= Lay Me Down (Pixie Lott song) =

Single by Pixie Lott

from the album Pixie Lott
- Released: 25 July 2014
- Recorded: 2013
- Studio: Venice House Studios
- Genre: Pop; soul; R&B
- Length: 3:25
- Label: Mercury
- Songwriter(s): Ashton Parson; Matt Parad; Adam Pallin

Pixie Lott singles chronology
"Nasty" (2014)	"Lay Me Down" (2014)	"Caravan of Love" (2014)

"Lay Me Down" is a song by English recording artist Pixie Lott from her self-titled third studio album (2014). The song was released on 25 July 2014 as the album's second and final single.

== Commercial performance ==
"Lay Me Down" failed to chart within the top 100 of the UK Singles Chart, peaking at number 114. Nevertheless, the single reached number seventy-eight on the UK Singles Sales Chart.

== Music video ==
The music video for "Lay Me Down" was directed by Ben Falk and filmed in Cannes, France. According to Falk, Lott wanted the video to "evoke the glamour of Brigitte Bardot". The video premiered on 5 June 2014.

== Track listings ==
- Digital single
1. "Lay Me Down" – 3:25
- Digital EP
1. "Lay Me Down" – 3:25
2. "I Only Want to Be with You" – 2:22
3. "Cry Baby" – 3:31
4. "Champion" (Live from the Pool) – 3:01

== Charts ==
Chart (2014)	Peak position
CIS Airplay (TopHit)	148
Scotland (OCC)	61
South Korea International Singles (Gaon)	26
UK Singles (OCC)	114
