= Mama Do (Uh Oh, Uh Oh) =

2009 single by Pixie Lott

Single by Pixie Lott

from the album Turn It Up
- B-side: "Want You"; "Use Somebody"
- Released: 3 June 2009
- Recorded: 2009
- Studio: Swamp, West Hampstead, London
- Genre: Soul; synth-pop
- Length: 3:16
- Label: Mercury
- Songwriters: Mads Hauge; Phil Thornalley
- Producers: Mads Hauge; Phil Thornalley; Greg Kurstin (add.)

Pixie Lott singles chronology
"Mama Do (Uh Oh, Uh Oh)" (2009)	"Boys and Girls" (2009)

"Mama Do (Uh Oh, Uh Oh)" (also known as "Mama Do") is the debut single by the English singer and songwriter Pixie Lott released as the lead single from her debut studio album, Turn It Up (2009). Written and produced by Mads Hauge and Phil Thornalley, the song was released digitally in the United Kingdom on 6 June 2009 and physically on CD 8 June 2009. It debuted at number one on the UK Singles Chart. Aged 18, Lott was one of the youngest singers to have a UK number-one single since Britney Spears in 1999. "Mama Do (Uh Oh, Uh Oh)" received positive reviews from music critics.

== Background and composition ==
Written and produced by Mads Hauge (co-writer of Natasha Bedingfield's "Soulmate") and Phil Thornalley (co-writer of Natalie Imbruglia's "Torn"), "Mama Do (Uh Oh, Uh Oh)" is an uptempo electropop song which opens with siren-like synths and melodramatically soulful vocal. The song is composed of many synthesisers, drum machine and keyboards. It is composed in the key of D#minor. It has 120 beats per minute and runs through a moderate electropop-oriented beat. The song's lyrics tell the story of a teenage girl who is restricted by parents into not getting into a relationship with another boy. The girl then goes out at night out of rebellion and keeps questioning her parents' reaction to everything she is doing throughout her night out. Lott explained the song to Digital Spy:

"It's about sneaking out the house and going to see a specific person without your parents knowing about it. It's a really cool song because it suits my age and I can relate to it. I mean, there have been a couple of occasions when I might have sneaked out the house and not told my mum and dad."

== Release and promotion ==
Two different B-sides were recorded for the single's release; "Want You" appears on its CD single, whilst an acoustic cover of alternative rock band Kings of Leon's 2008 hit single "Use Somebody" was featured as the digital single's B-side. Due to the strong popularity of the single at the time, "Use Somebody" reached number fifty-two on the UK Singles Chart as well on non-single downloads only. The song is also featured on various album compilations, including Bravo Hits 67, Just Dance – The Biggest Pop and Dance Hits, Bravo Black Hits Vol. 21.

As part of the single's promotion, Lott performed the song on various television shows, including: Live Lounge, Freshly Squeezed, Sound, Totally Saturday, Loose Women and GMTV. A Simlish version of the song was also recorded to feature on the Electronic Arts computer game The Sims 3. The track was covered by Selena Gomez, Lorde, Girls' Generation-TTS and Dutch pop singer Esmée Denters. The Manchester-based electronic music duo Flip & Fill have also remixed the song, included as track number ten on the compilation album Clubland 15.

== Critical reception ==
"Mama Do (Uh Oh, Uh Oh)" received positive reviews from multiple music critics. Ruth Harrison of FemaleFirst positively reviewed the song, stating that "this track is just what we need this summer" and that "[i]t's like a slice of grown up bubblegum pop". Daniel Wilcox of 411mania.com described the song as "a sassy and soulful number along the lines of Amy Winehouse's bigger singles, only more powerful and sexy, and that much more vocally impressive". Digital Spy music editor Nick Levine wrote that "Mama Do (Uh Oh, Uh Oh)" "is a soulful slice of retro-pop that lands somewhere between the realms of Duffy and Natasha Bedingfield". In a positive review for the BBC Chart Blog, Fraser McAlpine commented that the song "is mined from the same gently retro school of blues that guided Duffy to all those Brit awards earlier in the year". He also wrote that "[t]he melody smacks of a less bleak retelling of Amy Winehouse's 'Back To Black', as performed by the Sugababes".

Brit Music Scene's Dave Parrack stated that the song "shows off her style really well, allowing her to sing around a catchy bassline which accentuates rather than overbears her voice". The website of the UK branch of the mobile phone company Orange positively compared Lott to other female artists of the same genre, stating that the song is "a thoroughly enjoyable blast of handclapping, cymbal-crashing pop, and features some of the catchiest 'uh-oh-uh-oh'-ing since Beyoncé's 'Crazy in Love'. Pixie's undeniably impressive vocals still come off rather more Gabriella Cilmi than Amy Winehouse, but it's a sterling start from a definite one-to-watch".

== Commercial performance ==
"Mama Do (Uh Oh, Uh Oh)" debuted at number one on the UK Singles Chart, selling 58,840 downloads in its first week. Lott described her reaction upon learning the song reached number one: "I was in bed at my mum and dad's, where I still live, in Brentwood, Essex. I was on the laptop, and I got a phone call from my A&R man. He really dragged it out. I said, 'Please put me out of my misery.' And he said, 'I'm really, really sorry but... you're No 1!' I spent the rest of the day running around the house, screaming."

The single was certified silver by the British Phonographic Industry (BPI) on 28 August 2009 for sales in excess of 200,000 copies. Exactly 11 years later, on 28 August 2020, the certification was upgraded to gold for sales and streams of over 400,000. As a result of the single's popularity at the time, the single's iTunes B-side, "Use Somebody", debuted and peaked, during the single's release week, on the UK Singles Chart at number 52 on sales of 4,409 downloads.

The single also had considerable success outside the UK, reaching the top 10 in Denmark and France, and the top 20 in Ireland, Netherlands and New Zealand.

== Music video ==
The music video, directed by Trudy Bellinger, was released to Myspace in Lott's news section and has gained in excess of two million views on YouTube, where it was added on 28 April 2009. It begins with Lott lying on her back in a large white bed. She wakes up when two pairs of gloved hands clap along to the song before dragging her into a world filled with countless white silk material to create an imagery of a white-only room. Her friends then come crawling under the sheets in white outfits and they then move on through a locker with Lott into a locker room where she then changes into a red outfit and puts special grip powder on her hands. Lott and her group then move into a more glamorous-looking dressing room where they can be seen getting ready. Lott is now wearing a black outfit and she begins a clap-like dance with her friends before a group of guys arrive outside the dressing room on motorbikes with their headlights shining on the dressing room. The group of girls and group of guys then progress into a clap-themed dance-off. The dance-off ends with Lott slapping one of the guys in the male group and a loud cheer and celebration afterwards. Lott then climbs onto a white motorbike with the "X" from her name on it, wearing sunglasses. She then rides home where the video ends with her lying in bed again, wearing the sunglasses, until someone (presumably one of her parents) snatches them off her face, waking her up.

Trudy Bellinger describes the music video's concept and background:

This song has an infectious clap that runs throughout and I wanted to visually reference the clapping and embellish it as the unique hook of the video.

As this is Pixie's debut video it was important for her label to show off all her incredible talents – she is stunning and a brilliant dancer. I wanted the choreography to really stand out as being fresh and different. The clapping was the obvious starting point to create a fusion of Pat-a-cake, capoeira and physical theatre. In order to achieve this fusion of styles, I worked with two choreographers: Paul Roberts for his slick sharpness, and Kate Pearson for her innovative physical theatre.

The fusion really worked, and after two days of intense rehearsals we had an amazingly tight piece, although we had problems with twenty dancers being covered in bruises! In order to get the attitude across and the intensity with the choreography they really had to slap each other. We had to change the styling to hide all the bruises, particularly on the thighs.

The concept was also brought about by the lyrics, which are about sneaking out in the night and getting up to no good without your parents knowing. The idea of her crawling through her bed into this other world made it fantastical and have creative licence to have a few surreal elements. The bed scene was made up of thirty or so mattresses inside a tent of giant silk. The light was amazing, and once inside the bed set it felt so calming and peaceful. This serenity really reflects Pixie's performance in this section.

Through a door in the bed we see Pixie and the girls arrive through a locker into a locker room where they start to prepare themselves for the clap off. I shot at MC Motors and as this location is used a lot, I didn't want it to look like other videos but liked the textures and structure. We built a lockerroom with a pink perplex floor, leopard printdrops and a circular red pouffe.

The contrast of the hot pink next to the red brought a contemporary fashion to the video. Using red and pink neons sewn together with lots of pipes and industrial props. The main dance area was transformed into a more power station or factory feel. With a club edge, creating an exciting backdrop to the clap off.

Denzil Armour lit it, and Sam Brown did second unit, whilst Mark Adcock shot Bolex enabling me to get coverage of the six sets and choreography in one day. The drama of the clap off was created shooting at 100fps and speed ramping and jump cutting. And Ducati supplied all the bikes for the guys as well as Pixie's white one, which we added her logo to.

== Track listings ==
- CD single
1. "Mama Do (Uh Oh, Uh Oh)" – 3:19
2. "Want You" – 3:59
- iTunes single
1. "Mama Do (Uh Oh, Uh Oh)" – 3:18
2. "Use Somebody" – 3:06
- iTunes EP
1. "Mama Do (Uh Oh, Uh Oh)" (Linus Loves Vocal) – 4:55
2. "Mama Do (Uh Oh, Uh Oh)" (Bimbo Jones Vocal) – 7:04
3. "Mama Do (Uh Oh, Uh Oh)" (T2 Remix) – 5:05
4. "Mama Do (Uh Oh, Uh Oh)" (Donae'o Remix Radio Edit) – 3:42

== Personnel ==
Credits adapted from the liner notes of Turn It Up.

- Pixie Lott – vocals, backing vocals
- Tom Coyne – mastering
- Mads Hauge – backing vocals, bass, drums, engineering, guitar, keyboards, Pro Tools, production, programming
- Anders Kallmark – synthesiser
- Greg Kurstin – additional production
- Carlos Oyanedel – additional mixing
- Chris Sansom – additional engineering
- Phil Smith – baritone saxophone, tenor saxophone
- Phil Tan – mixing
- John Thirkell – flugelhorn, trumpet
- Phil Thornalley – drums, piano, production

== Charts ==
=== Weekly charts ===
Chart (2009–2012)	Peak position
Australia (ARIA)	55
Austria (Ö3 Austria Top 40)	32
Belgium (Ultratop 50 Flanders)	22
Belgium (Ultratop 50 Wallonia)	30
Czech Republic Airplay (ČNS IFPI)	18
Denmark (Tracklisten)	8
Europe (European Hot 100 Singles)	5
France (SNEP)	10
Germany (GfK)	30
Hungary (Rádiós Top 40)	19
Hungary (Single Top 40)	9
Ireland (IRMA)	13
Italy (FIMI)	25
Netherlands (Dutch Top 40)	20
Netherlands (Single Top 100)	15
New Zealand (Recorded Music NZ)	19
Portugal Digital Song Sales (Billboard)	6
Romania (Romanian Top 100)	64
Scottish Singles Sales (Official Charts)	4
Slovakia Airplay (ČNS IFPI)	12
South Korea International Singles (Gaon)	6
Spain (Promusicae)	23
Sweden (Sverigetopplistan)	27
Switzerland (Schweizer Hitparade)	34
UK Singles (Official Charts)	1

=== Year-end charts ===
Chart (2009)	Position
Hungary (Rádiós Top 40)	123
UK Singles (OCC)	56

Chart (2012)	Position
South Korea International Singles (Gaon)	12

== Certifications ==
Region	Certification	Certified units/sales
United Kingdom (BPI)	Gold	400,000^{‡}
^{‡} Sales+streaming figures based on certification alone.

== Release history ==
Region	Date	Format(s)	Label
Germany	3 June 2009	One-track digital single	Universal Music
Germany	4 June 2009	Two-track digital single; digital EP	Universal Music
United Kingdom	6 June 2009	One-track digital single	Mercury Records
United Kingdom	7 June 2009	Two-track digital single; digital EP	Mercury Records
United Kingdom	8 June 2009	CD single	Mercury Records
Australia	17 July 2009	Digital download	Universal Music
Australia	7 August 2009	CD single	Universal Music
Germany	28 August 2009	CD single	Universal Music
