= Boys and Girls (Pixie Lott song) =

2009 single by Pixie Lott

Single by Pixie Lott

from the album Turn It Up
- B-side: "If I Changed"
- Released: 5 September 2009
- Recorded: November 2008–April 2009
- Studio: Swamp (West Hampstead, London, England)
- Genre: Electropop; dance-pop; acid jazz
- Length: 3:02
- Label: Mercury
- Songwriters: Mads Hauge; Phil Thornalley; Pixie Lott
- Producers: Mads Hauge; Phil Thornalley; Fraser T Smith

Pixie Lott singles chronology
"Mama Do (Uh Oh, Uh Oh)" (2009)	"Boys and Girls" (2009)	"I Got Soul" (2009)

"Boys and Girls" is a song by the English recording artist Pixie Lott, released as the second single from her debut album, Turn It Up. It was released digitally in the United Kingdom on 5 September 2009 by Mercury Records as an iTunes EP, followed by an iTunes single on 6 September and a physical release on 7 September. Similarly to "Mama Do (Uh Oh, Uh Oh)", the track was also strongly supported by BBC Radio 1, becoming Lott's second consecutive single to feature on the station's A-list. "Boys and Girls" became Lott's second consecutive number-one single, topping the UK Singles Chart in September 2009. The song also served as Lott's debut single in the United States, where it was released on 24 August 2010 through the iTunes Store.

== Background and composition ==
"Boys and Girls" is an uptempo electropop song that follows a combination of a retro-styled beat produced by various brass instruments which are most prominent in the song's intro, as well as synthetic rhythms put together as a dance-sounding finished product through many synthesizers, drum machine, and keyboards. Lott employs a low note throughout the chorus, whilst experimenting with other notes in the song's verses and as a backing toward the end of the song. Lott's voice is heavily vocoded in the song's bridge to build the song up from upbeat pop to upbeat electropop, The song samples Rihanna's Shut Up & Drive with less of its usual pop punk sound and more to an electropop sound.

The song's lyrics follow a simple concept of having fun with people and friends in a party-like atmosphere. The song is one of nine tracks co-written by Lott on her debut album, Turn It Up. Lott co-wrote the song with producers Mads Hauge and Phil Thornalley. The original track demo was leaked in 2008 but the song received a re-working for its single release in 2009. A&R at Mercury, Joe Kentish, felt the production needed "more drive and urgency and needed to work on the dance floor as well as the radio." Producer and songwriter Fraser T Smith was brought in to work on the track. According to Smith in an interview with HitQuarters,

"When I received the parts, I thought the production was great but felt very retro. I wanted to make it a little more current and more urgent - I wanted to make the drums hit a little bit harder, and I wanted to make Pixie's voice sound a little bit fuller."

The song's original riffs were removed and replaced with attention-grabbing brass and trumpet instrumentation, described as typical to the Mark Ronson-type song production.

== Release and promotion ==
For the CD single release, the song was accompanied by a B-side entitled "If I Changed", which was co-written by Lott and is one of the slower songs she has recorded. "If I Changed" dons a R&B and soul style in the form of a ballad. "If I Changed" was included as an iTunes bonus track on the album, Turn It Up. As part of the promotion for "Boys and Girls", Lott performed the single on various television shows and at various major gigs which included performances on: GMTV, Loose Women, The National Lottery, The 5:19 Show, Alan Carr: Chatty Man and as an opening act on The Work Tour by the British girl group The Saturdays. On 15 August 2009, Lott performed the single alongside the likes of Hoobastank, The All-American Rejects, Kasabian, Cobra Starship, Dizzee Rascal, Boys Like Girls, Estranged and Raygun as one of the live acts at Asia's very first MTV World Stage Live in Malaysia concert that was held in Malaysia. The song became Lott's second song to be featured on EA Games game The Sims. English electronic music duo Moto Blanco have also created various club-styled remixes of the song, which are featured on the single's digital remix bundle.

== Critical reception ==
"Boys and Girls" was given mixed reviews. Pete Cashmore of The Guardian stated the song "is endeavouring to bestow upon us a brassy, sassy dancefloor heater like some smug Italia Conti Pink", but criticized the track for being "much like a vegetarian restaurant, she just ain't got the chops." He also made comment on the lyrics claiming they were the "oomph and pizzazz of an English-speaking robot struggling to read Sanskrit from an autocue. A Lott of shite." Andrew Hirst of the Huddersfield Daily Examiner praised the song crediting it for having a "full-bodied big production" and "late 60s fun sound." Fraser McAlpine of BBC Chart Blog made comparisons to other songs and artists stating that it had a "hefty dose of 'I Want It All' from High School Musical 3 to the verses." He then stated "there is also a lot of Rihanna to the chorus." McAlphine also made comment that "the chorus is a one-note drone, with harmonic support, over a three-chord pounding vamp thing." Jess McGuire of Defamer Australia said "the song is catchy, but not in a retarded nursery rhyme kinda way. Children will probably find it appealing, but so will adults who harbour secret dreams of appearing on So You Think You Can Dance?"

Brit Music Scene's Dave Parrack used a comparison to previous single "Mama Do" as the basis for his review of the "party feel song with an unashamedly happy underlying vibe". Parrack mentioned "Boys and Girls" as a song that much more upbeat and appealing on a different level than "Mama Do". He went on to say that the song's chorus is not as catchy as the previous single but a more memorable song as a whole. He then went on to describe the song as a cross between the English girl group Sugababes and American pop singer Katy Perry. Rach Read of Teentoday.co.uk raved the song as a "barnstormer with a brilliant video to boot", further saying the track is "far poppier than we ever expected of the Pixie but it's all the better for it - in fact as the song itself says 'A good beat never hurt no-one'". FemaleFirst.co.uk had little compliments for the single in their review, deeming "Boys and Girls" as "too throwaway pop, the lyrics are boring, and the single is just amateur, it’s not really delivering anything positive!" Another mixed review was published by musicOMH's Michael Cragg, describing the track as "brilliant fun, if slightly unconvincing."

== Chart performance ==
On the issue dated 3 September 2009, the song debuted on the Irish Singles Chart at number forty-five. The following week, it was the greatest gainer on the chart moving up to its peak position of number four, becoming Lott's highest-peaking single in Ireland so far. "Boys and Girls" debuted on the UK Singles Chart at number seventy-three on the issue dated 6 September 2009. It moved up to number one the following week, breaking the record for the biggest leap to the top of the UK singles chart from inside the top 75 (as per The Guinness Book of British Hit Singles). It replaced "Run This Town" by Jay-Z featuring Rihanna and Kanye West, earning Lott her second consecutive chart-topper in the United Kingdom. It has so far spent four consecutive weeks within the top ten and 24 weeks altogether within the top 100 of the UK Singles Chart.

== Music video ==
Lott in a human-sized teacup in the music video.

The music video for the song was directed by Diane Martel. Filming was completed on 13 June 2009. Lott described the video during an interview for Paul Lester of The Guardian: "It's got a crazy house-party vibe. There were loads of interesting extras, weird indie boys and rude-boy gangstas. It's got a dance routine. It's unusual for a British performer to do singing and dancing, but it's important if you're a pop star to do everything." Lott is described as "a cool B-Girl 2009 surrounded by a crazy house party in full swing", in publicity materials for the video.

Two videos were made for the song: one with the single version, served to most pop stations, and one with the Moto Blanco Remix Edit, which was made for dance stations and was played a few times on Nickelodeon UK as well. Both versions are also available on YouTube and VEVO.

The video opens with Lott's name flashing onscreen before moving into a scene where she opens a door and walks into a club. In this scene, however, only her legs and shoes are visible until the focus shifts to a large radio and various record players. Lott can then be seen in full, looking in a mirror with her face being showcased in numerous reflections. The video's attention is then moved in sequence between Lott and various other young people in the club, that can either be seen preoccupied with a hip hop-styled dance or standing up against the wall and in one occasion kissing with their partner. On time with the first chorus, Lott takes the lead role in a fast-pace dance with a group of female dancers on the dancefloor. The next scene involves Lott wearing a white sleeveless shirt leaning against a boy as they stand side-by-side up against a white lit-up wall. The video is intercut with some short scenes, where Lott can be seen wearing a pair of black sunglasses.

== Track listings ==
UK CD single and iTunes single

1. "Boys and Girls" (Single Version) – 3:02
2. "If I Changed" – 3:41

iTunes remix bundle

1. "Boys and Girls" – 3:04
2. "Boys and Girls" (Moto Blanco Remix Full) – 7:15
3. "Boys and Girls" (Fuzzy Logic Remix Full) – 5:47
4. "Boys and Girls" (Hot Pink Delorean Remix Full) – 6:37

== Personnel ==
- Pixie Lott – vocals, backing vocals
- Beatriz Artola – engineer
- Mads Hauge – producer, Wurlitzer, guitar, programming, engineer
- Geoff Pesche – mastering
- Chris Sansom – additional engineer
- Fraser T Smith – additional producer, additional mixing
- Phil Smith – tenor saxophone, baritone saxophone
- John Thirkell – flugelhorn, trumpet
- Phil Thornalley – producer, piano, guitar

== Charts ==
=== Weekly charts ===
Chart (2009–2010)	Peak position
Australia (ARIA)	67
Belgium (Ultratip Bubbling Under Flanders)	3
Belgium (Ultratip Bubbling Under Wallonia)	18
Czech Republic Airplay (ČNS IFPI)	27
Denmark (Tracklisten)	39
Europe (Eurochart Hot 100)	10
Ireland (IRMA)	4
Scottish Singles Sales (Official Charts)	5
Slovakia Airplay (ČNS IFPI)	28
UK Singles (Official Charts)	1

=== Year-end charts ===
Chart (2009)	Position
UK Singles (OCC)	77

== Certifications ==
Region	Certification	Certified units/sales
United Kingdom (BPI)	Gold	400,000^{‡}
^{‡} Sales+streaming figures based on certification alone.

== In popular culture ==
The song is featured in Fred: The Movie, which Lott also stars in, released on September 18, 2010. The song is featured in the soundtrack of Horrid Henry: The Movie, released in 2011.

Indonesian isotonic drink Mizone used "Boys and Girls" as a background song for a TV commercial in 2011.
