= Chicken (EP) =

EP by Ednaswap
- Released: 1996
- Recorded: 1995
- Genre: Hard rock, post-grunge
- Length: 18:41
- Label: Island
- Producer: Ednaswap

Ednaswap chronology
Ednaswap (1995)	Chicken (1996)	Wacko Magneto (1997)

Professional ratings
Review scores
Source	Rating
Allmusic	(3/5)

Chicken is L.A. rock band Ednaswap's first and only EP. It was recorded after the band left Eastwest Records and was signed to Island Records, and came out a year before their full-length Island debut, Wacko Magneto.

== Track listing ==
1. "Glow" (Anderson, Carla Azar, Paul Bushnell, Scott Cutler, Anne Preven) – 4:02
2. "Nothing is Broken" (Anderson, Azar, Bushnell, Cutler, Preven) – 3:02
3. "Torn" (Scott Cutler, Anne Preven, Phil Thornalley) – 4:01
4. "Therapy" (Anderson, Azar, Bushnell, Cutler, Preven) – 4:05
5. "Way Down" (Anderson, Azar, Bushnell, Cutler, Preven) – 3:31

== Personnel ==
- Rusty Anderson – Guitar
- Carla Azar – Drums
- Paul Bushnell – Bass
- Bryan Carlstrom – Engineer
- Annette Cisneros – Assistant Engineer
- Scott Cutler – Guitar
- Ednaswap – Producer, Design, Cover Design
- Derick Ion – Photography
- Bryan Jerden – Assistant Engineer
- Anna Kalinka – Design, Cover Design
- Anne Preven – Vocals
- Eddy Schreyer – Mastering
