= Chicken (disambiguation) =

A chicken (Gallus domesticus) is a type of domesticated bird.

Chicken, chickens, or the chicken may also refer to:

- Chicken (food)

== Film and television ==
- Chicken (1996 film), a New Zealand comedy film
- Chicken (2001 film), an Irish short film
- Chicken (2015 film), a British drama film directed by Joe Stephenson
- Chickens (1916 film), a film starring Oliver Hardy
- Chickens (1921 film), an American silent comedy drama film
- The Chicken (film), a 1965 short comedy film directed by Claude Berri
- Chickens (TV series), a UK TV series starring Simon Bird and Joe Thomas
- Chicken (Family Guy), a recurring character in the American TV series Family Guy
- One of the titular characters in the TV series Cow and Chicken
- "Chickens" (BoJack Horseman), a 2015 episode

== Music ==
- Chicken (EP), Los Angeles rock band Ednaswap's only EP

=== Songs ===
- "Chicken" (The Eighties Matchbox B-Line Disaster song), 2003
- "The Chicken" (music), a jazz tune composed by Pee Wee Ellis and made famous by Jaco Pastorius
- "The Chicken Song", a parody song from Spitting Image, 1986
- "Chicken", by Sly and the Family Stone from Life, 1968
- "Chicken", by The Cheers, written by Jerry Leiber, Mike Stoller, and Jack Rollins, 1955
- "Chicken", by Kero Kero Bonito, 2015
- "Chicken", by Semler, 2021
- "The Chicken", a song by Bo Burnham from The Inside Outtakes, 2022
- "Chickens", by Future and EST Gee from I Never Liked You , 2022
- "Chicken Song", from the 2014 film Bajrangi Bhaijaan

== People ==
- A coward
- Chicken (gay slang), a young or young appearing gay male
- Gary "Chicken" Hirsh (1940–2021), drummer for the rock group Country Joe and the Fish
- Wilfred "Chicken" Smallhorn (1911–1988), Australian rules footballer

== Other uses ==
- Alfred Chicken, a platform video game
- Chicken (game), a typical game studied in game theory
- Chicken, Alaska, a city in the United States
- Chicken Creek (disambiguation), multiple watercourses
- Chicken Rock, an island administered by the Isle of Man
- Dixie Chicken (bar), a popular bar in College Station, Texas, also called The Chicken
- Chicken (Scheme implementation), a compiler and interpreter for the programming language Scheme
- Chicken (video game), a 1982 video game for Atari 8-bit computers
- Grouse, a group of game birds popularly called chicken in some areas
- Robot Chicken, American adult stop motion-animated sketch comedy television series
- The Chicken (dance), a popular American rhythm and blues dance
- The San Diego Chicken, a San Diego–based sports mascot, also called The Chicken
