= Chicken Creek =

Chicken Creek may refer to:

- Chicken Creek (South Carolina), a stream in Berkeley County
- Chicken Creek (South Dakota), a stream
- Chicken Creek, Utah, a ghost town
