= Anne Preven =

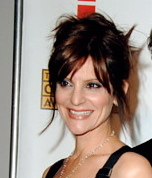
- Preven in 2007

Background information
- Born: February 25, 1965 (age 61); New York City, U.S.
- Genres: Pop rock, alternative rock
- Occupations: Songwriter; music publisher; record producer
- Label: Pulse Recording
- Formerly of: Ednaswap
- Website: www.pulserecordings.com

Anne Preven (born February 25, 1965) is an American songwriter, music publisher, and record producer. As a member of the alternative rock band Ednaswap, she co-wrote "Torn" which was covered by Lis Sørensen (Danish), Trine Rein (Norwegian), and Natalie Imbruglia (Australian). The latter's version became a worldwide number one airplay hit, spending 11 weeks on the Billboard Hot 100 Airplay Chart in the US. "Torn" has sold an estimated four million copies, received platinum certification in three countries, and was declared the "number one radio single of the 1990s" by radio personality Rick Dees. As a songwriter, Preven has written for prominent music industry artists including Madonna, Beyoncé, Katy Perry, Sinéad O'Connor, Miley Cyrus, Demi Lovato, Jordin Sparks, Zac Brown Band, Pnau, Andy Grammer, Lea Michele, Pixie Lott, and Westlife.

== Early life ==
Preven was born in New York. Her father, David Preven, is a psychiatrist in New York City, and she was a mental health-worker at age 17, where she spent time with depressed adolescents. The experience provided the "psychotic and neurotic threads" in her songwriting lyrics, as well as her college major.

== Career ==
Preven graduated magna cum laude from Harvard College with a self-designed major: "psychobiology." While at school, she sang with and was musical director of "the Opportunes," Harvard's co-ed a cappella group. After Harvard, she returned to New York City, where she began writing her own songs. While in New York City, she met Scott Cutler who was visiting from Los Angeles. In 1991 she moved there.

Cutler and Preven formed a band with Rusty Anderson, Paul Bushnell and Carla Azar in 1993. The band name, "Ednaswap," came from a nightmare Preven had about watching herself in a band with that name getting booed off stage. Ednaswap signed a record deal in 1995, despite having only a few songs written and never having performed a full live set. They played a short, acoustic set in Cutler's living room. The short concert led to a recording contract, though the resulting self-titled album "shocked" Elektra Records. While the acoustic set suggested folk pop, the result was alternative rock. As Preven notes, "They thought they were buying a red car and we gave them a blue one." The label did not promote the album and dropped the band.

The band signed with Island Records in January 1996 after its president, Chris Blackwell, saw the band play at the Roxy. The band produced their second full-album, Wacko Magneto, with producer Dave Jerden in 1997. The band promoted the album by going on to tour with No Doubt, Weezer, Failure, and Better than Ezra. In 1998, they made a third and final, more radio-friendly album, Wonderland Park. Ednaswap disbanded after the album in 1999.

After Ednaswap, Preven, Cutler and Coogan formed the short lived "Annetenna". The band signed with Columbia Records and produced an album. However, Columbia shelved the album after a company reorganization, and Annetenna subsequently disbanded. In 2001, the band eventually released all the songs for free through their website. Annetenna's song, "74 Willow," originally an Ednaswap song, was featured on HBO's Six Feet Under.

Preven's first big cut was "Sanctuary", which Madonna covered for her 1994 Bedtime Stories. Madonna was introduced to the song by a friend of Preven and Cutler, who heard an early version of it and thought "Madonna would love this song!" Madonna's version came out before Ednaswap had even received a record deal, and the song deviated from Preven's idea. Preven originally thought Madonna had ruined the song, going so far as to meeting with Madonna to plead for changes. However, upon hearing the song as part of the whole album, Preven says she "understood what [Madonna] was going for." Preven and Cutler's most famous cover was the song, "Torn". The two co-wrote the song in 1993 with producer Phil Thornalley before they had a band. Preven claims that the lyrics were written quickly. The first album recording of the song came from Danish singer Lis Sørensen in 1993, who was introduced to the song by Thornalley. A second version arrived in 1996 by Trine Rein, who was also introduced to the song by Thornalley. Ednaswap released their first version of "Torn" on their self-titled album.

A second version appeared on their 1996 EP Chicken, and a third more dirge-like version on Wacko Magneto. However, the song became famous through Natalie Imbruglia's 1997 version on her debut album, Left of the Middle. Imbruglia's version has been described as "a defining song of its year, if not decade." The song dominated radio airplay for weeks and Imbruglia's album went platinum in the UK and double platinum in the US, largely on the strength of "Torn". The song has appeared multiple times on television shows, such as Canadian Idol and X Factor. Although Preven was happy to hear her song on the radio, she was disappointed that it was Imbruglia's version rather than Ednaswap's that became so well known. In 1998, Ednaswap's fans petitioned KROQ, the LA radio station, to play the two side by side for comparison, with voters for the rock station heavily favoring Ednaswap's. However, the pop version won out more broadly.

After the dissolution of Ednaswap and Annetenna, Preven increasingly wrote and produced for other artists. She worked with Cutler on Sinéad O'Connor's 2000 Faith and Courage, and on Mandy Moore's 2001 self-titled album. They also wrote for Miley Cyrus, both as Hannah Montana on her Disney show, and on her first album, Breakout. Since then, she has worked with Katy Perry, Sinéad O'Connor, Demi Lovato, Jordin Sparks, Pixie Lott, Conway, Pnau, Adam Lambert, Lea Michele, Miranda Cosgrove, and Leona Lewis.

In 2007, she (along with co-writers Cutler and Henry Krieger) was nominated for an Academy Award and a Golden Globe Award and won the Critic's Choice Award for Best Original Song for "Listen" from the motion picture adaptation of Dreamgirls. "Listen" was subsequently added to the stage production of Dreamgirls, which is currently playing at the Savoy Theatre on London's West End. In 2011, Preven was nominated for a Grammy Award for Best Song Written for Visual Media for her collaboration with Zac Brown Band on "Where The River Goes" from the movie Footloose. In 2009, she worked with Irish pop band Westlife for a track "The Difference" included in their Where We Are album where it charted #2 in both UK Albums Chart and Irish Albums Chart.

In 2015, she began writing and producing music for film and television beginning with two songs, "Come Clean" and "Dead Hider and Seeker," for the USA Network series Satisfaction. In 2016, she produced cover versions of Nina Simone's "New World Coming" and Sia's "Hologram", that were featured in the second season of Amazon Prime's series Transparent. In 2017, Preven co-wrote the song "Zan Astam", featured in the Amazon Prime series I Love Dick. In 2019, she served as music producer on the Transparent: Musicale Finale.

For songwriting, Preven keeps a notebook with her and "always jots down poetry and prose entries." She then goes back through them in the studio to try and see if anything in the journal can be matched with a melody she is working on to become lyrics. She finds that hit songs are often those that sound similar to other songs, but she rejects trying to "genetically engineer" a song formally, holding that such songs "end up sounding like a ransom note."

=== Pulse music group ===
In 2007, Preven and Cutler began their own music publishing company with record producer Josh Abraham, who founded Pulse Recording (recently renamed Pulse Music Group) in 2004. Pulse Music Group is the parent company of Pulse Music Publishing. Pulse describes itself as "by musicians and for musicians," and strives to be a "sanctuary" for artists to explore their creative potential. In 2012, the company established a partnership with Creative Nation, the Nashville-based music management and publishing company owned by songwriter Luke Laird and his wife Beth Laird. After forming a partnership with Fuji Music Group in 2014, PULSE expanded its client roster to include Christian “Bloodshy” Karlsson, BØRNS, Gallant, Starrah, El-P of Run The Jewels, DRAM (rapper), RY X, and Kaytranada among others. The company's other major ventures include music producer Rick Rubin's first music publishing company, American Songs, and Marc Anthony's Latin entertainment company Magnus Media. Pulse operates two recording studios, one based at its headquarters in Los Angeles, and four studios based in Burbank, California.

== Personal life ==
Preven lives in Los Angeles. She has two children: Max and Violet.

== Discography ==
Title	Album details
Wonderland Park	Released: August 18, 1998; Label: Island Records
Wacko Magneto	Released: March 4, 1997; Label: Island Records
Ednaswap	Released: May 9, 1995; Label: EastWest / Atlantic Records

== Selected songwriting discography ==
Year	Artist	Album	Song	Co-written with
2018	Claire Richards	My Wildest Dreams	"Forever Ends With You"	Matt Rad, Felicia Barton
2016	Martina Stoessel		"Finders Keepers"	Mike Green, James Wong
2015	Leona Lewis	I Am	"Thank You"	Leona Lewis, Toby Gad
2015	Leona Lewis	I Am	"Ladders"	Leona Lewis, Wayne Wilkins, Kevin Anyaeji
2014	Lea Michele	Louder	"Louder"	Jaden Michaels, Colin Munroe
2014	Lea Michele	Louder	"Cue The Rain"	Lea Michele, Matt Radosevich, Felicia Barton
2014	Lea Michele	Louder	"Don't Let Go"	Matt Radosevich, Felicia Barton
2014	Lea Michele	Louder	"Gone Tonight"	Lea Michele, Felicia Barton, CJ Baran, Drew Lawrence
2014	Lea Michele	Louder	"The Bells"	Scott Cutler
2013	Conway	Star Trek Into Darkness (Music from the Motion Picture)	"The Growl"	J. J. Abrams, Kassia Conway, Charles Scott
2013	Demi Lovato	Demi	"Nightingale"	Demi Lovato, Matt Radosevich, Felicia Barton
2012	Adam Lambert	Trespassing	"Cuckoo"	Adam Lambert, Josh Abraham, Bonnie McKee, Oliver Goldstein
2011	Zac Brown	Footloose: Music from the Motion Picture	"Where The River Goes"	Zac Brown, Drew Pearson, Wyatt Durrette
2011	Pixie Lott	Young Foolish Happy	"What Do You Take Me For?"	Pixie Lott, Christopher Mercer, Terrence Thornton
2011	Pnau	Soft Universe	"The Truth"	Pnau, Scott Cutler
2011	Pnau	Soft Universe	"Unite Us"	Pnau, Scott Cutler
2009	Westlife	Where We Are	"The Difference"	Scott Cutler, Brian Kennedy Seals
2009	Miley Cyrus	Hannah Montana: The Movie	"Spotlight"	Scott Cutler
2009	Demi Lovato	Here We Go Again	"Remember December"	Demi Lovato, John Fields
2009	Demi Lovato	Here We Go Again	"Solo"	Demi Lovato, Scott Cutler
2009	Demi Lovato	Here We Go Again	"Quiet"	Demi Lovato, Scott Cutler
2009	Jordin Sparks	Battlefield	"No Parade"	Scott Cutler, Dapo Torimiro
2008	Katy Perry	One of the Boys	"Self Inflicted"	Katy Perry, Scott Cutler
2008	Miley Cyrus	Breakout	"The Driveway"	Miley Cyrus, Scott Cutler
2008	Miley Cyrus	Breakout	"Full Circle"	Miley Cyrus, Scott Cutler
2008	Miley Cyrus	Breakout	"These Four Walls"	Scott Cutler, Cheyenne Kimball
2007	Miley Cyrus	Hannah Montana 2: Meet Miley Cyrus	"Start All Over"	Scott Cutler, Fefe Dobson
2006	Beyoncé	Dreamgirls: Music from the Motion Picture	"Listen"	Beyoncé, Scott Cutler, Henry Krieger
2006	Paul Oakenfold	A Lively Mind	"The Way I Feel" (featuring Ryan Tedder)	Paul Oakenfold, Scott Cutler, Ryan Tedder, Ian Green
2006	Taylor Hicks	Taylor Hicks	"The Maze"	Scott Cutler
2005	Josh Kelley	Almost Honest	"Too Good To You"	Josh Kelley, Scott Cutler
2001	Mandy Moore	Mandy Moore	"Yo-Yo"	Scott Cutler
2000	Sinéad O'Connor	Faith and Courage	"No Man's Woman"	Sinéad O'Connor, Scott Cutler
2000	Sinéad O'Connor	Faith and Courage	"The State I'm In"	Scott Cutler
1998	Natalie Imbruglia	Left of the Middle	"Torn"	Scott Cutler, Phil Thornalley
1994	Madonna	Bedtime Stories	"Sanctuary"	Madonna, Dallas Austin, Scott Cutler, Herbie Hancock
1993	Eternal	Always & Forever	"Save Our Love"	Scott Cutler, Eddie Chacon
1990	The Party	The Party	"I Found Love"	

== Selected production discography ==
Year	Artist	Album	Details
2021	Camila Cabello	Cinderella	Producer
2014	Lea Michele	Louder	Vocal Producer
2013	Demi Lovato	Demi	Vocal Producer
2011	Pixie Lott	Young Foolish Happy	Mixer
2011	Pnau	Soft Universe	Producer
2009	Jordin Sparks	Battlefield	Producer
2008	Katy Perry	One of the Boys	Producer
2008	Miley Cyrus	Breakout	Producer
2007	Miley Cyrus	Hannah Montana 2: Meet Miley Cyrus	Producer
2000	Sinéad O'Connor	Faith and Courage	Producer

== Awards and nominations ==
Grammy Awards

- Grammy Award for Best Song Written for Visual Media ("Where The River Goes") (Nominee)

Broadcast Film Critics Association Award

- Best Song ("Listen") (Winner)

Academy Award

- Best Song ("Listen") (Nominee)

Golden Globe Award

- Best Song ("Listen") (Nominee)

Black Reel Awards

- Best Song ("Listen") (Nominee)

Satellite Award

- Best Original Song ("Listen") (Nominee)
