= What Do You Take Me For? =

Single by Pixie Lott featuring Pusha T

from the album Young Foolish Happy
- Released: 4 November 2011
- Recorded: 2011
- Genre: Hip pop
- Length: 2:55
- Label: Mercury
- Songwriter(s): Pixie Lott; Anne Preven; Christopher Mercer; Terrence Thornton
- Producer(s): Rusko

Pixie Lott singles chronology
"All About Tonight" (2011)	"What Do You Take Me For?" (2011)	"Kiss the Stars" (2012)

Pusha T singles chronology
"Trouble on My Mind" (2011)	"What Do You Take Me For?" (2011)	"Mercy" (2012)

"What Do You Take Me For?" is a song by the English singer Pixie Lott from her second studio album, Young Foolish Happy (2011). The song features American rapper Pusha T and was released on 4 November 2011 as the album's second single. The track received its first play on Capital FM on 26 September 2011.

== Critical reception ==
Robert Copsey of Digital Spy gave the song four out of five stars, stating: "Fortunately, the rest of the track is less spooktacular and more in-yer-face girl power. 'Don't know what you think I'm after/ What do you take me for?' she calls over a squelchy and thoroughly grindable bassline with just enough disgust in her tone to warn off any fellas who think she's a cheap date. We hate to break it to you Pix, but wearing a snakeskin leotard and popping your crotch on the dancefloor in your accompanying music video will do little to help your cause...you big tease!"

== Commercial performance ==
"What Do You Take Me For?" debuted at number 10 on the UK Singles Chart with first-week sales of 34,335 copies, becoming Lott's first non-number-one single to chart inside the top 10. The following week, it fell to number 20 with 16,553 copies sold.

== Music video ==
The music video, directed by Declan Whitebloom, premiered on 6 October 2011 and develops on a dark background while Lott is seen dancing and singing. It begins with a black and orange Citroen DS3 pulling into a building before Lott and various scantily-clad back-up dancers perform their routine while Pusha T is seemingly pleading to Lott.

== Track listing ==
- Digital EP
1. "What Do You Take Me For?" – 2:55
2. "What Do You Take Me For?" (Bimbo Jones Remix) – 5:55
3. "What Do You Take Me For?" (E-Squire Remix) – 5:31
4. "What Do You Take Me For?" (Benji Boko Remix) – 3:06

== Personnel ==
Credits adapted from the liner notes of Young Foolish Happy.

- Pixie Lott – vocals
- Tim Debney – mastering
- Alex G. – additional engineering, additional vocal production
- Anne Preven – mixing
- Pusha T – rap
- David Ralicke – horns
- Rusko – production

== Charts ==
Chart (2011)	Peak position
Euro Digital Song Sales (Billboard)	20
Ireland (IRMA)	30
Scotland (OCC)	9
UK Singles (OCC)	10

== Release history ==
Region	Date	Format	Label	Ref.
Ireland	4 November 2011	Digital download	Mercury	
United Kingdom	6 November 2011	Digital download	Mercury	
