= Young Foolish Happy =

Studio album by Pixie Lott
- Released: 11 November 2011
- Recorded: January–October 2011
- Studio: The Library (London) (Note: Track 1); Pulse Recording (Los Angeles) (Note: Tracks 3 and 20); Swamp (West Hampstead, London) (Note: Tracks 5, 12 and 18); Kite (Note: Track 8); Homeschool (New York City) (Note: Lead vocals on track 13); Henson (Los Angeles) (Note: Instruments on track 13); Sweatbox (Los Angeles) (Note: Track 14); Titanium (London); Mason Sound (North Hollywood, California) (Note: Track 16); Decoy (Studio City, California) (Note: Track 17)
- Genre: Pop; R&B
- Length: 49:17
- Label: Mercury
- Producer: Captain Hook; Eagle Eye; Andrew Frampton; Toby Gad; Adrian Gurvitz; Mads Hauge; Ash Howes; The Invisible Men; Patrick "Jester" Jordan-Patrikios; Brian Kidd; Steve Kipner; John Legend; The Matrix; Mr Hudson; Tim Powell; Jaz Rogers; Rusko; Richard "Biff" Stannard; Phil Thornalley; The Underdogs; Patrick Warren; Ant Whiting

Pixie Lott chronology
Turn It Up (2009)	Young Foolish Happy (2011)	Pixie Lott (2014)

Alternative cover
- Deluxe edition cover

Singles from Young Foolish Happy
- 1. "All About Tonight" Released: 1 September 2011; 2. "What Do You Take Me For?" Released: 4 November 2011; 3. "Kiss the Stars" Released: 29 January 2012

Young Foolish Happy is the second studio album by the English singer Pixie Lott, released on 11 November 2011 by Mercury Records. Lott enlisted previous collaborators Mads Hauge, Phil Thornalley, Toby Gad, Steve Kipner and Andrew Frampton to handle production for the album, in addition to new collaborators such as Tim Powell, The Matrix and Rusko. The album also includes collaborations with artists such as Stevie Wonder and John Legend.

Upon its release, Young Foolish Happy was met with mixed reviews from music critics; while some reviewers found the album solid, others viewed it as formulaic and short of originality, and felt it lacks the "charm" of Lott's debut album, Turn It Up (2009). The album debuted at number 18 on the UK Albums Chart with first-week sales of 18,503 copies, failing to match the commercial success of its predecessor. It spawned the UK number-one single "All About Tonight" and the top-10 singles "What Do You Take Me For?" and "Kiss the Stars".

== Background and release ==
Lott began work on the album in Los Angeles in January 2011. In April 2011 she told Digital Spy, "There are a couple of really cool collaborations on the album and I've already worked with some big people, but I can't say who they are just in case those tracks don't make the final cut", describing the sound as "still pop stuff, but maybe a little more soulful. That's the kind of thing that I'm into. That influence is stronger on this album." On 17 September 2011, Lott revealed the album title, which is inspired by the Tams' 1968 song "Be Young, Be Foolish, Be Happy". She stated, "It's a song I grew up listening to, from a young age. I grew up listening to a lot of soul music and I think this album sounds more this kind of way. It's a message that I've always really liked and I think it's important that need to people remember, it's just motivating and inspirational."

The album was initially scheduled for release in the United Kingdom on 7 November 2011, but it was eventually pushed back a week to 14 November. To celebrate the launch of the Pixie Collection, London-based women's clothing retailer Lipsy offered the first 10,000 customers a voucher to redeem on Lott's official website and obtain the album for £3 off.

"Everybody Hurts Sometimes" was covered by South Korean singers Wendy and JeA.

== Singles ==
"All About Tonight" was released on 2 September 2011 as the album's lead single. Lott premiered the song on BBC Radio 1's The Chris Moyles Show on 11 July 2011. It debuted at number one on the UK singles chart, becoming Lott's third UK number one. "All About Tonight" also reached number nine on the Irish Singles Chart, Lott's second highest-peaking single on the chart after "Boys and Girls" (2009).

Second single "What Do You Take Me For?", featuring rapper Pusha T, was released on 4 November 2011. The track reached number 10 on the UK singles chart and number 30 on the Irish Singles Chart.

"Kiss the Stars" was released on 29 January 2012 as third and final single from the album, peaking at number eight in the UK and number 33 in Ireland.

== Critical reception ==
Professional ratings
Review scores
Source	Rating
AllMusic	2.5/5 stars
Daily Express	2/5
London Evening Standard	3/5 stars
MSN Music	3/5
NME	4/10
Today	2.5/5 stars
Virgin Media	3/5 stars

Young Foolish Happy received generally mixed reviews from music critics. BBC Music's Fraser McAlpine felt that the album has "little of the magic that characterised her debut's highs" and criticised Lott for "working with songwriters who are capable of a finely tuned pastiche or two", but nevertheless cited "Nobody Does It Better" and "You Win" as "notable exceptions". Rick Pearson of the London Evening Standard noted that Lott "opts for a more soulful direction this time around, something that works better with her wind tunnel of a vocal. She's still guilty of imitation rather than innovation, however, particularly on the synth-heavy 'All about Tonight', which is a craven rip-off of a Katy Perry record. But an identity is the only thing that's lacking here." AllMusic critic Stephen Thomas Erlewine named the "Motown-mythologizing" "Stevie on the Radio" one of the "brighter, better songs [on the album], largely because it has bigger beats and hooks", but commented that "the rest of the record has the form of a blockbuster record but lacks the requisite rhythms or hooks and its scale dampens Lott's spunky personality, which was her primary charm on her debut."

Ben Chalk of MSN Music wrote that while the ballads are "the real weak point", the uptempo material is "a vast improvement". Chalk continued, "Where debut Turn It Up showcased an original writing talent which belied the giggly blonde Essex girl persona, Young Foolish Happy sometimes lapses into a pastiche of Pixie's musical heroes." Duncan Gillespie of NME found "All About Tonight" and "What Do You Take Me For?" to be "quite good", but dismissed Lott's "Jools Holland-ready retropop collaboration with Stevie Wonder" as "horrible, but still not horrible enough. Rather than righteous ire, you're left with only a sense of moral and cultural confusion, rather as if you'd caught yourself lusting after an ironing board." Simon Gage of the Daily Express stated that although Young Foolish Happy is a "pretty solid album of bouncy pop numbers", artists like Adele, Lady Gaga and Katy Perry leave "artists like Pixie out in the cold", adding that the album "has all the catchiness you would expect from last year's golden girl, but this year is a very different place." Virgin Media's Ian Gittins agreed, commenting that the album is "adequate, but never special: lacking Perry's raunch, Gaga's glitz, Adele's larynx or Jessie J's sass, it looks like Pixie Lott is set to remain a decidedly B-list pop star." Kevin Mathews of Singaporean newspaper Today expressed that the album "contains enough vocal and rhythmic hooks to keep the pop public sated as tracks like 'Come Get It Now', 'All About Tonight' and 'Nobody Does It Better' deliver in all these departments with some aplomb. The rest of Young Foolish Happy does not stray too far from this formula, which should keep Pixie Lott in demand for the immediate future."

== Commercial performance ==
Young Foolish Happy debuted at number 18 on the UK Albums Chart, selling 18,503 copies in its first week. The following week, it dropped 24 places to number 42. The album was certified Gold by the British Phonographic Industry (BPI) on 10 February 2012. As of August 2014, it had sold 102,888 copies in the United Kingdom. Young Foolish Happy also entered the Irish Albums Chart at number 33.

== Track listing ==
No.	Title	Writer(s)	Producer(s)	Length
1.	"Come Get It Now"	Pixie Lott; Mr Hudson; Cathy Dennis; Robin French	Mr Hudson	2:19
2.	"All About Tonight"	Lott; Tebey Ottoh; Brian Kidd; Tommy Lee James	Kidd; Ottoh^{[a]}	3:06
3.	"What Do You Take Me For?" (featuring Pusha T)	Lott; Anne Preven; Christopher Mercer; Terrence Thornton	Rusko; Alex G.^{[b]}	2:55
4.	"Nobody Does It Better"	Lott; Tim Powell; Wayne Hector; Richard Stannard	Powell; Andrei Basirov^{[c]}	3:33
5.	"Kiss the Stars"	Lott; Mads Hauge; Phil Thornalley	Hauge; Thornalley	3:14
6.	"Stevie on the Radio"	Lott; Adrian Gurvitz; Marthony "Mark" Tabb	Gurvitz	4:10
7.	"Everybody Hurts Sometimes"	Lott; Christopher J. Baran; James Bourne	Captain Hook	4:04
8.	"Dancing on My Own" (featuring Marty James)	Lott; Toby Gad; M. James	Gad; Ant Whiting^{[a]}	3:50
9.	"Love You to Death"	Lott; Gad; Ruth-Anne Cunningham	Gad	3:29
10.	"Birthday"	Lott; The Invisible Men; Eagle Eye	The Invisible Men; Eagle Eye; The Arcade^{[d]}	3:16
11.	"Bright Lights (Good Life) Part II" (with Tinchy Stryder)	Lott; Jarrad Rogers; Tinchy Stryder	Jaz Rogers	4:04
12.	"Perfect"	Lott; Hauge; Thornalley	Hauge; Thornalley	3:05
13.	"You Win"	Lott; John Stephens; Tennille De Freitas	John Legend; Patrick Warren	4:22
14.	"We Just Go On"	Lott; Steve Kipner; Andrew Frampton; Patrick Jordan-Patrikios	Kipner; Frampton; Jordan-Patrikios	3:50
Total length:				49:17

Deluxe edition bonus tracks
No.	Title	Writer(s)	Producer(s)	Length
15.	"Till the Sun Comes Out"	Lott; Baran; Bourne	Captain Hook	3:38
16.	"The Thing I Love"	Lott; Harvey Mason Jr.; Damon Thomas; James Fauntleroy	The Underdogs	3:35
17.	"I Throw My Hands Up"	Lott; Lauren Christy; Graham Edwards; Scott Spock	The Matrix	2:51
18.	"Black as Rain"	Lott; Hauge; Thornalley	Hauge; Thornalley	3:43
19.	"Paper Planes"	Lott; Stannard; Ash Howes; Hector	Stannard; Ash Howes	3:41
20.	"What Do You Take Me For?" (Benji Boko Remix) (featuring Pusha T)	Lott; Preven; Mercer; Thornton	Rusko; G.^{[b]}; Boko^{[e]}	3:07
Total length:				69:52

iTunes Store deluxe edition bonus videos
No.	Title	Length
21.	"All About Tonight"	3:10
22.	"What Do You Take Me For?"	3:00
Total length:		76:02

Japanese edition
No.	Title	Writer(s)	Producer(s)	Length
8.	"Dancing on My Own" (featuring G-Dragon and T.O.P from Big Bang)	Lott; Gad; M. James	Gad	4:22
21.	"Mama Do (Uh Oh, Uh Oh)"	Hauge; Thornalley	Hauge; Thornalley; Greg Kurstin^{[d]}	3:16
22.	"Cry Me Out"	Lott; Hauge; Thornalley; Colin Campsie	Hauge; Thornalley	4:04
23.	"Boys and Girls"	Hauge; Thornalley; Lott	Hauge; Thornalley; Fraser T Smith^{[d]}	3:02

=== Notes ===
- ^{^[a]} signifies a vocal producer
- ^{^[b]} signifies an additional vocal producer
- ^{^[c]} signifies a production assistant
- ^{^[d]} signifies an additional producer
- ^{^[e]} signifies a remixer and additional producer
- The Asian deluxe edition of the album has the same track listing as the Japanese edition, but does not include the song "Perfect" and all tracks after that song are listed as 13 to 22.

== Personnel ==
Credits adapted from the liner notes of the deluxe edition of Young Foolish Happy.

=== Musicians ===
- Pixie Lott – vocals (all tracks); background vocals (tracks 12, 18)
- Robin French – piano, keyboards, bass, backing vocals (track 1)
- Mr Hudson – piano, drums, guitars, percussion, saxophone, Hammond organ, keyboards, bass, backing vocals (track 1)
- Rosie Oddie – backing vocals (track 1)
- Holly Muir – backing vocals (track 1)
- Felicia Barton – additional background vocals (track 2)
- Pusha T – vocals (tracks 3, 20)
- David Ralicke – horns (tracks 3, 20)
- Tim Powell – keyboards, programming (track 4)
- Sandy Buglass – guitars (track 4)
- Tony "Rico" Richardson – saxophone, flute (track 4)
- Colin Graham – trumpet, flugelhorn (track 4)
- Fiasco – additional programming (track 4)
- Mads Hauge – vocals, all instruments (track 5); programming (tracks 5, 12); guitar, background vocals (tracks 12, 18); mandolin, keyboards, bass (track 12)
- Abe Laboriel Jr. – bass (track 6)
- Nathan East – bass (track 6)
- Aaron Sterling – drums (tracks 6, 13)
- Adrian Gurvitz – guitar, keyboards (track 6)
- Stevie Wonder – harmonica (track 6)
- J'Anna Jacoby – violin (track 7)
- Joel Pargman – violin (track 7)
- Tom Lea – viola (track 7)
- John Krovoza – cello (track 7)
- John "JT" Thomas – piano (track 7)
- Noah Agruss – arrangement (track 7)
- CJ Baran – arrangement (tracks 7, 15); all instruments, programming, background vocals (track 15)
- Marty James – vocals (track 8)
- Toby Gad – all instruments, programming (tracks 8, 9)
- Ant Whiting – additional programming, additional bass guitar (track 8)
- Tim Baxter – additional string programming (track 8)
- George Astasio – guitar, bass, programming (track 10)
- Ray Djan – guitar, keyboards, programming (track 10)
- Jason Pebworth – keyboards (track 10)
- Jon Shave – keyboards, bass, programming (track 10)
- Ashton Foster – programming (track 10)
- The Arcade – additional programming (track 10)
- Tinchy Stryder – vocals (track 11)
- Jaz Rogers – all instruments, programming (track 11)
- Phil Thornalley – piano, glockenspiel, bass, background vocals (track 12); Wurlitzer electric piano (track 18)
- Everton Nelson – violin (tracks 12, 18)
- Rick Koster – violin (tracks 12, 18)
- Bruce White – viola (tracks 12, 18)
- Ian Burdge – cello (tracks 12, 18)
- Elroy "Spoonface" Powell – background vocals (track 12)
- Patrick Warren – string arrangements, keyboards (track 13)
- John Legend – piano (track 13)
- David Piltch – bass (track 13)
- Timothy Young – guitar (track 13)
- Daphne Chen – violin (track 13)
- Eric Gorfain – violin (track 13)
- Lauren Chipman – viola (track 13)
- Richard Dodd – cello (track 13)
- Patrick "Jester" Jordan-Patrikios – keyboards, programming (track 14)
- Andrew Frampton – keyboards, programming, all guitars, bass (track 14)
- Steve Kipner – percussion (track 14)
- Katie Stevens – background vocals (track 15)
- Andrew Hey – guitar (track 16)
- Ash Soan – drums (track 18)
- Ben Epstein – bass (track 18)
- Tim "Wacko Jacko" Jackson – piano (track 18)
- John Thirkell – trumpet (track 18)
- Phil Smith – tenor saxophone (track 18)
- Richard "Biff" Stannard – keys, programming (track 19)
- Ash Howes – keys, programming (track 19)
- Seton Daunt – guitar (track 19)
- Emma Rohan – backing vocals (track 19)
- Benjamin Gordon aka Benji Boko – keyboards (track 20)

=== Technical ===
- Mr Hudson – production, engineering (track 1)
- Andy Savours – mixing (track 1)
- Tim Debney – mastering (tracks 1–3, 5–20)
- Brian Kidd – production (track 2)
- Tebey Ottoh – vocal production (track 2)
- Chris Utley – engineering (track 2)
- Wesley Michene – engineering (track 2)
- Jimmy Douglass – mixing (track 2)
- Rusko – production (tracks 3, 20)
- Anne Preven – mixing (tracks 3, 20)
- Alex G. – additional engineering, additional vocal production (tracks 3, 20)
- Tim Powell – production (track 4)
- Phil Tan – mixing (track 4)
- Andrei Basirov – production assistance (track 4)
- Colin Leonard – mastering (track 4)
- Mads Hauge – production, mixing, recording (tracks 5, 12, 18)
- Phil Thornalley – production (tracks 5, 12, 18)
- Adrian Gurvitz – production (track 6)
- Jaycen Joshua – mixing (track 6)
- Jesus Garnica – mixing assistance (track 6)
- Stuart Schenk – recording engineering (track 6)
- Chris Thompson – recording engineering (track 6)
- Captain Hook aka CJ Baran – production, mixing, engineering (tracks 7, 15)
- Larry Goetz – additional mixing (tracks 7, 15)
- Lee Slater – engineering (tracks 7, 15)
- Toby Gad – production (tracks 8, 9); mixing (track 9)
- Ant Whiting – vocal production, mixing (track 8)
- Daniel Aslet – additional vocal engineering (track 8)
- Jaz Rogers – vocal recording (track 9); production, engineering (track 11)
- The Invisible Men – production, mixing (track 10)
- Eagle Eye – production (track 10)
- Greg "The Wizard" Fleming – mixing (track 10)
- The Arcade – additional production (track 10)
- Jamie Snell – mixing (track 11)
- John Legend – production (track 13)
- Patrick Warren – production (track 13)
- Ryan Freeland – mixing, instrument recording (track 13)
- Jason Agel – lead vocals recording (track 13)
- Andrew Frampton – production (track 14)
- Steve Kipner – production (track 14)
- Patrick "Jester" Jordan-Patrikios – production (track 14)
- Dan Frampton – mixing (track 14)
- Anselmo Washington – mixing assistance (track 14)
- The Underdogs – production (track 16)
- Harvey Mason Jr. – mixing (track 16)
- Andrew Hey – recording (track 16)
- David Boyd – recording assistance (track 16)
- Dabling Harward – recording assistance (track 16)
- Michael Daley – recording assistance (track 16)
- The Matrix – production, recording, mixing (track 17)
- Aaron Renner – recording, mixing (track 17)
- Richard "Biff" Stannard – production (track 19)
- Ash Howes – production (track 19)
- Benjamin Gordon aka Benji Boko – remix, additional production (track 20)

=== Artwork ===
- Tom Bird – creative direction
- Sheryl Nields – photography
- Salvador Design – artwork, design

== Charts ==
=== Weekly charts ===
Chart (2011–2012)	Peak position
Croatian Albums (HDU)	32
Irish Albums (IRMA)	33
Japanese Albums (Oricon)	75
Scottish Albums (OCC)	18
South Korean Albums (Gaon)	20
UK Albums (OCC)	18

=== Year-end charts ===
Chart (2012)	Position
South Korean International Albums (Gaon)	47

== Certifications ==
Region	Certification	Certified units/sales
United Kingdom (BPI)	Gold	102,888

== Release history ==
Region	Date	Edition	Label	Ref(s)
Netherlands	11 November 2011	Standard; deluxe	Universal	
Ireland	11 November 2011	Standard	Mercury	
United Kingdom	14 November 2011	Standard; deluxe	Mercury	
South Korea	14 November 2011	Standard	Universal	
Sweden	14 November 2011	Standard; deluxe	Universal	
Germany	22 November 2011	Standard	Universal	
Poland	25 November 2011	Standard	Universal	
Australia	2 December 2011	Standard	Universal	
Italy	24 January 2012	Standard	Universal	
Germany	31 January 2012	Deluxe	Universal	
Japan	21 March 2012	Japanese standard	Universal	
South Korea	30 April 2012	Asian deluxe	Universal	
