= Kiss the Stars =

2012 single by Pixie Lott

Single by Pixie Lott

from the album Young Foolish Happy
- Released: 29 January 2012
- Recorded: 2011
- Studio: Swamp (London, UK)
- Genre: Dance-pop; Electropop
- Length: 3:14
- Label: Mercury
- Songwriters: Pixie Lott; Mads Hauge; Phil Thornalley
- Producers: Mads Hauge; Phil Thornalley

Pixie Lott singles chronology
"What Do You Take Me For?" (2011)	"Kiss the Stars" (2012)	"Bright Lights" (2012)

"Kiss the Stars" is a song by the English singer Pixie Lott from her second studio album, Young Foolish Happy (2011). The song was released digitally in the United Kingdom on 29 January 2012 as the album's third and final single. The dance-pop song was written by Lott in collaboration with its producers Mads Hauge and Phil Thornalley. "Kiss the Stars" received mainly negative reviews from contemporary critics who criticised the song's lyrics and close similarities to Katy Perry's "Firework" but praised its catchiness and dance-pop rhythms. The song peaked at number eight on the UK Singles Chart.

The song has been accompanied by a futuristic-themed music video, which was released on 10 January 2012. The video was met with mainly positive reviews. It features Lott dancing alongside CGI robots and dancers, sporting funky hairstyles and outfits that resemble those of American recording artist Madonna. Lott has promoted the single by performing it at the Jingle Bell Ball, The National Lottery and the seventh series of Dancing on Ice.

== Background and composition ==
"Kiss the Stars" was written by Lott in collaboration with the track's producers Mads Hauge and Phil Thornalley. The trio previously worked together on Lott's number-one singles "Mama Do (Uh Oh, Uh Oh)" and "Boys and Girls".

== Critical reception ==
"Kiss the Stars" has received mainly negative reviews, being criticised lyrically and for being too similar to the singles released by American singer Katy Perry. Fraser McAlpine of the BBC said that the song is essentially Perry's "Firework" (2010). While Ian Gittins of Virgin Media felt that the song "apes Katy Perry down to its nudge-nudge lyrics: 'When you turn it on, I can go for hours.'" The song was negatively reviewed by Alex Jackson of The Yorker who called it "cheesy centric" and "a track one may expect at a 5 year-old's birthday party."

The track received a mixed review from Adam Berry of WhatCulture! who also felt that it evoked a style similar to Katy Perry in addition to the Vengaboys and Freezepop. He went on to criticise the song's "dreadful" lyrics but complimented it as "irritatingly catchy". Berry also predicted the track to be a "huge" success chartswise in the United Kingdom. "Kiss the Stars" was deemed as a great song with a catchy chorus and poppy rhythms by Kathryn Black of Pugwash News. Black, however, like other critics, felt that the song "sounds like a rip-off of Katy Perry's 'Firework'."

== Chart performance ==
"Kiss the Stars" debuted at number eighty-one on the UK Singles Chart. The following week the song rose to number fourteen with sales of 18,647 units. In its third week on the chart, it rose to number eight, selling 26,983 units and becoming Lott's fifth top ten hit and ninth consecutive top 20 hit.

== Music video ==
=== Background and synopsis ===
"Sexiness definitely comes from the inside – if you feel comfortable, you feel sexier and more confident. But if you’re wearing something you’re not sure about, you end up feeling self-conscious, and I think that shows."

— Lott, talking about her new look.

Lott, in the music video for "Kiss the Stars", sporting a long blonde ponytail and black outfit that is reminiscent of Madonna's look during her Blond Ambition World Tour (1990).

The music video for "Kiss the Stars" premiered on Lott's YouTube channel on 10 January 2012. Lott's appearance in the video has been described as a new look for her and an evolution from her previous music videos.

The music video features Lott donning a number of different outfits. It opens with Lott sporting a high ponytail, a black top and dark eye make-up. In the following scene, Lott is seen dancing in a tight leotard with leggings and her hair styled poker straight. In another scene, Lott wears a long blonde wig with a blunt fringe and a flowing white dress. She is also seen dancing against a futuristic background, surrounded by CGI dancers that resemble robots. In another scene, Lott kisses one of the robots, the robot then forms itself into an attractive male dancer.

=== Reception ===
The music video has received mainly positive reviews from contemporary critics, most likening Lott's look in it to those of pop singers such as Madonna, Lady Gaga and Kylie Minogue. According to Caroline Westbrook of Metro. Lott's long blonde ponytail and black outfit look is reminiscent of Madonna's style during ger Blond Ambition World Tour (1990). Westbrook also felt that Lott's leotard, straught bob look bears an odd resemblance to Lady Gaga. Capital FM positively reviewed the video, describing it as "visually exciting". The video was deemed "a futuristic visual delight" by 4music. Radio station In:Demand said that Lott looks "as radiant as ever" in the music video.

Shaun Kitchener from the website Entertainmentwise, felt that the music video was "bizarre" and criticised Lott for "upping the cheese factor" in it. The video received a mixed review from Lina Bastidas of PopDash, who like Kitchener from PopDash's sister website Entertainmentwise, felt that Lott's dance moves were "cheesy". Bastidas further criticised the video's "weird" settings but complimented Lott's "funky hairstyles and futuristic oufits."

== Live performances ==
Lott first performed "Kiss the Stars" on 3 December 2011 at the Jingle Bell Ball concert at The O2 Arena in London. The single was then performed live on The National Lottery on 31 December 2011. Her first television performance of 2012 was on Dancing on Ice on 15 January and she also performed it on Friday Download. On 3 February 2012, she performed the song on Blue Peter. On 24 March 2012, she performed the song on the results show of The Voice of Ireland.

== Personnel ==
- Pixie Lott – vocals
- Mads Hauge – producer, vocals, instrumentation, programming
- Phil Thornalley – producer, engineer, mixing
- Tim Debney – mastering

Credits adapted from Young Foolish Happy album liner notes.

== Charts ==
=== Weekly charts ===
Chart (2012)	Peak position
Euro Digital Song Sales (Billboard)	20
Ireland (IRMA)	33
Romania (Romanian Top 100)	59
Scotland Singles (OCC)	5
UK Singles (OCC)	8

=== Year-end charts ===
Chart (2012)	Position
UK Singles (Official Charts Company)	126

== Certifications ==
Region	Certification	Certified units/sales
United Kingdom (BPI)	Silver	200,000^{‡}
^{‡} Sales+streaming figures based on certification alone.

== Release history ==
Region	Date	Format	Label
United Kingdom	29 January 2012	Digital download	Mercury Records
