= Wonderland Park =

Studio album by Ednaswap
- Released: August 18, 1998
- Recorded: c. 1997–1998
- Genre: Alternative rock
- Length: 45:13
- Label: Island
- Producer: Scott Cutler; Anne Preven; Ednaswap

Ednaswap chronology
Wacko Magneto (1997)	Wonderland Park (1998)

Singles from Wonderland Park
- 1. "Back on the Sun" Released: September 8, 1998

Wonderland Park was the third and final album of Los Angeles band Ednaswap. It had a much more pop-oriented sound than any of their other releases. It was released after the band's label, Island, underwent a reorganization that threatened Ednaswap's signed status.

Professional ratings
Review scores
Source	Rating
AllMusic	3/5 stars
Entertainment Weekly	A−
Melody Maker	1/5 stars
Pitchfork Media	7.7/10

== Track listing ==
1. "Safety Net" – 4:44 (Scott Cutler/Anne Preven)
2. "Back on the Sun" – 4:14 (Scott Cutler/Anne Preven)
3. "Liquid Soul" – 2:56 (Rusty Anderson/Paul Bushnell/Scott Cutler/Anne Preven)
4. "74 Willow" – 4:25 (Scott Cutler/Anne Preven)
5. "Without Within" – 4:10 (Rusty Anderson/Paul Bushnell/Scott Cutler/Anne Preven)
6. "A Conversation" – 3:40 (Scott Cutler/Anne Preven)
7. "Supernatural" – 4:01 (Scott Cutler/Anne Preven)
8. "Trivial" – 3:47 (Scott Cutler/Anne Preven)
9. "Flower" – 4:28 (Scott Cutler/Anne Preven)
10. "747" – 4:09 (Scott Cutler/Anne Preven)
11. "Invisible" – 4:25 (Scott Cutler/Anne Preven)

== Personnel ==
- Produced by Scott Cutler
- Co-Produced by Anne Preven

except Liquid Soul, Without Within and 747 produced by Scott Cutler and Ednaswap

- Engineered by Scott Cutler, Steve Churchyard, Bryan Carlstrom and Rusty Anderson

assisted by Alan Sanderson, Kenny Ybarra

- Mixed by Brian Malouf

except Back on the Sun and Safety Net mixed by Ken Andrews

- Mastered by Ted Jensen
- Cover photo by Marina Chavez
- Inside photos by Kate Romero
- Artwork by Anna Kalinka and Suppasak Viboonlarp
