= All About Tonight (Pixie Lott song) =

2011 single by Pixie Lott

Single by Pixie Lott

from the album Young Foolish Happy
- Released: 2 September 2011
- Recorded: 2011
- Genre: Dance-pop; electropop
- Length: 3:06
- Label: Mercury
- Songwriter(s): Pixie Lott; Tebey Ottoh; Brian Kidd; Tommy Lee James
- Producer(s): Brian Kidd

Pixie Lott singles chronology
"Broken Arrow" (2010)	"All About Tonight" (2011)	"What Do You Take Me For?" (2011)

"All About Tonight" is a song by the English singer Pixie Lott from her second studio album, Young Foolish Happy (2011). It was written by Lott, Tebey Ottoh, Brian Kidd, and Tommy Lee James, and produced by Kidd. The song released as the album's lead single on 2 September 2011, after premiering on BBC Radio 1's The Chris Moyles Show on 11 July 2011.

"All About Tonight" debuted at number one on the UK Singles Chart, becoming Lott's third number-one single on the chart. The song was nominated for British Single at the 2012 Brit Awards. The accompanying music video was directed by Marc Klasfeld and depicts Lott during a night out with her friends in Downtown Los Angeles.

== Background and composition ==
"All About Tonight" was written during a studio meeting between Lott, Canadian singer-songwriter Tebey and producer Brian Kidd at the ole Pop/Urban Songcamp in Los Angeles. Tebey had started working with a new manager, Ed Jefferson, who introduced him to Kidd. When the two got together, Tebey had the track done and his job was to write the top line. "I wrote the verse and started on the chorus, but I wasn't really loving it; I didn't think it was as strong as it should be. I called my friend Tommy Lee James, who's my main co-writer. He just happened to be in Los Angeles so I had him come by the studio and we wrote the rest of the song together after redoing the chorus", Tebey explained. "We weren't trying to write for her. We just wanted to write a great, upbeat pop song and it just so happened that it was what they were looking for in the next stage of her career, which is to try and break her in America... but the song can definitely work in the U.K. as well." The song was sent to A&R executives Jamie Nelson and Joe Kentish at Mercury Records, who showed immediate interest in it.

Musically, "All About Tonight" is a dance-pop and electropop song with elements of Hi-NRG. Lott herself described the song as "a party track about going out with the girls and forgetting about past dramas and relationships so that you can have fun and let your hair down."

== Critical reception ==
The song received mixed to positive reviews from music critics. Digital Spy music editor Robert Copsey gave the song three out of five stars, stating, "Naturally, she's decided to change tack; vamping up her sound to match her cheekier girl-next-door look for the LP's trailer single 'All About Tonight'. 'We'll be dancing and singing and climbing up on the tables,' she announces over a light 'n' bouncy disco-pop beat, before asking us to 'grab someone if you're single, grab someone if you're not'. It mightn't get the nod from most marriage counsellors, but thankfully Pix's gentle tones sound more Made in Chelsea than Geordie Shore." In a review of Young Foolish Happy, Duncan Gillespie of NME found the song "quite good" and compared it to American singer Kesha.

Pip Ellwood of Entertainment Focus, rating "All About Tonight" four out of five stars, viewed it as "another gem that sits nicely next to Pixie's previous singles but stands alone as a strong pop track", also calling it "an absolute corker". OddOne of Unreality Shout, however, gave the track one star only and noted that it "barely tries to set itself away from the aggregation of cheaply produced electropop/dance hits", further concluding, "From someone who achieved five Top 20 singles from her début, her futility and inability to advance from genres that ran bereft of character, fun and personality over a year ago suggest she and her team are quite clearly out of ideas."

== Commercial performance ==
"All About Tonight" debuted at number one on the UK Singles Chart with first-week sales of 88,893 copies (the highest of Lott's career), earning Lott her third UK chart-topper. Since the songs release it has been certified Platinum in the United Kingdom for the sales of 600,000 copies, becoming Lott's biggest hit of her career. The song also entered the Irish Singles Chart at number 10, peaking at number nine the following week. It became Lott's second top ten single in Ireland.

== Music video ==
The music video for "All About Tonight" was directed by Marc Klasfeld and filmed in Downtown Los Angeles. It premiered on 14 July 2011. The video begins with Lott walking and smiling to the camera, with superimposed shots of the Manhattan skyline at night. Lott is seen walking down a dim street and text messaging while partygoers watch her. She is soon joined by dancers as they perform a choreographed routine along the 6th Street Bridge. The video is intercut with clips of Lott lying on a black seat in the back of a car, as well as shots of her wearing a blonde wig under a bridge while surrounded by several people and objects, such as vintage furniture and a carousel horse. The video ends with Lott dancing with both female and male dancers, followed by a close-up shot of her smiling.

== Live performances ==
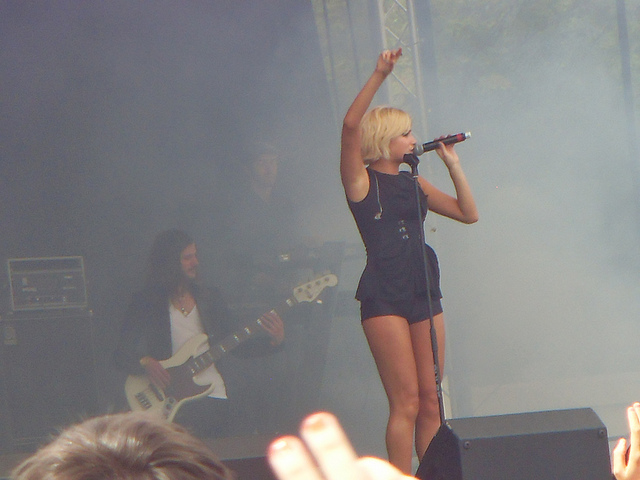
Lott performing the song at Hanley Park Festival in Stoke-on-Trent, England

Lott's first live performance of "All About Tonight" took place at Hanley Park Festival in Stoke-on-Trent on 16 July 2011, followed by a performance at Tramlines Festival in Sheffield on 23 July. On 31 July, she performed the song at Key 103 Live in Manchester and at Leeds' Party in the Park. On 28 August, Lott performed the track at Manchester Pride. Lott performed the song live on the British television game show Red or Black? on 4 September 2011. Two days later, she performed it on the British breakfast television show Lorraine.

The song was also performed at Sainsbury's Super Sunday festival at London's Clapham Common on 11 September, at BBC Radio 1's Teen Awards on 9 October, at the Radio Forth Awards in Edinburgh on 10 November, and at Capital FM's Jingle Bell Ball on 3 December. On 5 December 2011, Lott performed "All About Tonight" at the 99th Royal Variety Performance at The Lowry theatre in Salford, Greater Manchester, in the presence of Princess Anne. The event aired on ITV1 on 14 December. In August 2014, Lott performed the song at V Festival.

== Track listings ==
- Digital EP – remixes
1. "All About Tonight" – 3:05
2. "All About Tonight" (acoustic) – 2:34
3. "All About Tonight" (The Alias Remix) – 5:51
4. "All About Tonight" (The Mike Delinquent Project Remix) – 5:03
5. "All About Tonight" (video) – 3:13
- Austrian, German and Swiss digital single
1. "All About Tonight" – 3:07
2. "Mama Do (Uh Oh, Uh Oh)" – 3:16

== Personnel ==
Credits adapted from the liner notes of Young Foolish Happy.

- Pixie Lott – vocals, songwriting
- Felicia Barton – additional backing vocals
- Tim Debney – mastering
- Jimmy Douglass – mixing
- Tommy Lee James – songwriting
- Brian Kidd – production, songwriting
- Wesley Michene – engineering
- Tebey Ottoh – songwriting, vocal production
- Chris Utley – engineering

== Charts ==
=== Weekly charts ===
Chart (2011–12)	Peak position
Belgium (Ultratip Bubbling Under Wallonia)	11
Euro Digital Song Sales (Billboard)	2
Ireland (IRMA)	9
Japan (Japan Hot 100) (Billboard)	4
Scotland (OCC)	1
South Korea International Singles (Gaon)	50
UK Singles (OCC)	1

=== Year-end charts ===
Chart (2011)	Position
UK Singles (Official Charts Company)	59

Chart (2012)	Position
Japan (Japan Hot 100)	53

== Certifications ==
Region	Certification	Certified units/sales
United Kingdom (BPI)	Platinum	600,000^{‡}
^{‡} Sales+streaming figures based on certification alone.

== Release history ==
Region	Date	Format	Label	Ref.
Ireland	2 September 2011	Digital download	Mercury	
United Kingdom	4 September 2011	Digital download	Mercury	
France	12 September 2011	Digital download	Universal	
Australia	23 September 2011	Digital download	Universal	
Austria	18 November 2011	Digital download	Universal	
Germany	18 November 2011	Digital download	Universal	
Switzerland	18 November 2011	Digital download	Universal	
