= Ednaswap =

US alternative rock band (1993–1999)

- Also known as: Annetenna
- Origin: Los Angeles, California, U.S.
- Genres: Alternative rock; post-grunge; noise rock; alternative metal
- Years active: 1993–1999
- Labels: Eastwest; Island
- Past members: Anne Preven; Scott Cutler; Rusty Anderson; Paul Bushnell; Scot Coogan; Carla Azar

Ednaswap was an American rock band from Los Angeles, California, founded in 1993 and disbanded around 1998. Over a span of five years, the band released three albums and an EP through major label records East West, Elektra Records and Island Records.

The band is best known for the song "Torn", which was written by band members Scott Cutler and Anne Preven together with English musician Phil Thornalley, and first recorded by Danish artist Lis Sørensen. It later appeared on Ednaswap's debut album and has been covered many times since then, by artists such as Trine Rein, Natalie Imbruglia, Tori Amos, Hands Like Houses, Neck Deep, One Direction, and Phoebe Bridgers.

== History ==
In 1993, songwriters Scott Cutler and Anne Preven invited Rusty Anderson and Paul Bushnell to join their new band, Ednaswap. Frontwoman Anne Preven came up with the band's name after she dreamed she was in a band of the same name that was so bad they were booed off-stage.

Soon after recording an acoustic demo, the band was signed with the EastWest label. Ednaswap's self-titled 1995 album was the band's only record for EastWest, and the album was never put into wide release. EastWest released them from their contract soon after the album was released and the band was signed by Island Records soon afterwards. During this time, they briefly called themselves Edna Swap rather than Ednaswap.

"Torn", one of the tracks from their 1995 self titled album, also included in 1997's Wacko Magneto, their first full-length album to be put into wide release, was covered by Natalie Imbruglia, reaching number two in the UK Singles Chart and number one on airplay around the world. It was number one on the Billboard Airplay chart for 14 weeks. The single went on to sell over a million copies in the United Kingdom alone. However, Imbruglia's version of the song failed to bring commercial success to the band and Ednaswap subsequently disbanded on April 12, 1999. The band regrouped under the palindromic name Annetenna in 2001.

Ednaswap's sound evolved with nearly every release. Their self-titled debut could be best described as post-grunge, but Chicken and Wacko Magneto were grungy hard rock with some similarities to Veruca Salt and Live Through This-era Hole. Wacko was also described by one reviewer as a "Sex Pistols, Mick Ronson, Led Zeppelin and Jimi Hendrix smoothie". Wonderland Park further altered their sound. It was an extremely melodic pop rock album with some harder edges than most, again similar to Hole in both musical direction and timing. Before their dissolution, the band stated that they could have seen a return to the hardness of Wacko Magneto, and while no songs were recorded after Wonderland Park, Annetenna's work showed an even more polished Pop sound than Wonderland Park.

== Members ==
Former members

- Anne Preven – vocals
- Scott Cutler – guitar
- Rusty Anderson – guitar
- Paul Bushnell – bass
- Scot Coogan – drums
- Carla Azar – drums

== Discography ==
Ednaswap discography
- Studio albums: 3
- Extended plays: 1
- Singles: 4

=== Studio albums ===
Year	Album details
1995	Ednaswap: Released: May 9, 1995; Label: Eastwest Records (#61750); Formats: CD, CS
1997	Wacko Magneto: Released: March 4, 1997; Label: Polygram Records (#524328); Formats: CD, LP, CS
1998	Wonderland Park: Released: August 18, 1998; Label: Island Records (#524532); Formats: CD, CS

=== Extended plays ===
Year	Album details
1996	Chicken: Label: Island Records (#531059); Formats: CD, LP

=== Singles ===
Year	Single	Album
1995	"Glow"	Ednaswap
1995	"Torn"	Ednaswap
1997	"Clown Show"	Wacko Magneto
1997	"Back on the Sun"	Wonderland Park
