= Ednaswap (album) =

Studio album by Ednaswap
- Released: May 9, 1995
- Recorded: 1994
- Studios: Crystal Sound (Hollywood, California); Sound Factory (Hollywood, California); Ocean Way (Hollywood, California)
- Genres: Alternative rock, post-grunge, alternative metal
- Length: 53:45
- Label: East West
- Producers: Scott Cutler; Matt Hyde; Matt Wallace

Ednaswap chronology
Ednaswap (1995)	Wacko Magneto (1997)

Ednaswap is the debut album by Los Angeles band Ednaswap, released in 1995 by East West Records.

Natalie Imbruglia covered the song "Torn" for her 1997 debut album Left of the Middle. Sinéad O'Connor covered the song "The State I'm In" for her 2000 album Faith and Courage. American-Norwegian singer Trine Rein covered both songs for her 1996 album Beneath My Skin.

Professional ratings
Review scores
Source	Rating
Allmusic	3/5 stars

== Track listing ==
All lyrics are written by Anne Preven, except where noted; all music is composed by Preven and Scott Cutler, except where noted.

No.	Title	Writer(s)	Length
1.	"This Is a Song"		3:20
2.	"Clown Show"		4:35
3.	"Acrobat"		3:35
4.	"Ted and Joe"		3:47
5.	"Pale"		3:12
6.	"Blown Away"		4:25
7.	"The State I'm In"		4:08
8.	"Therapy"		3:45
9.	"More"		4:33
10.	"Minor Crap"		6:07
11.	"Glow"		4:26
12.	"Torn"	Cutler; Preven; Phil Thornalley	4:23
13.	"The Goodnight Moon"		3:22
