= Trine Rein =

American-Norwegian singer (born 1970)

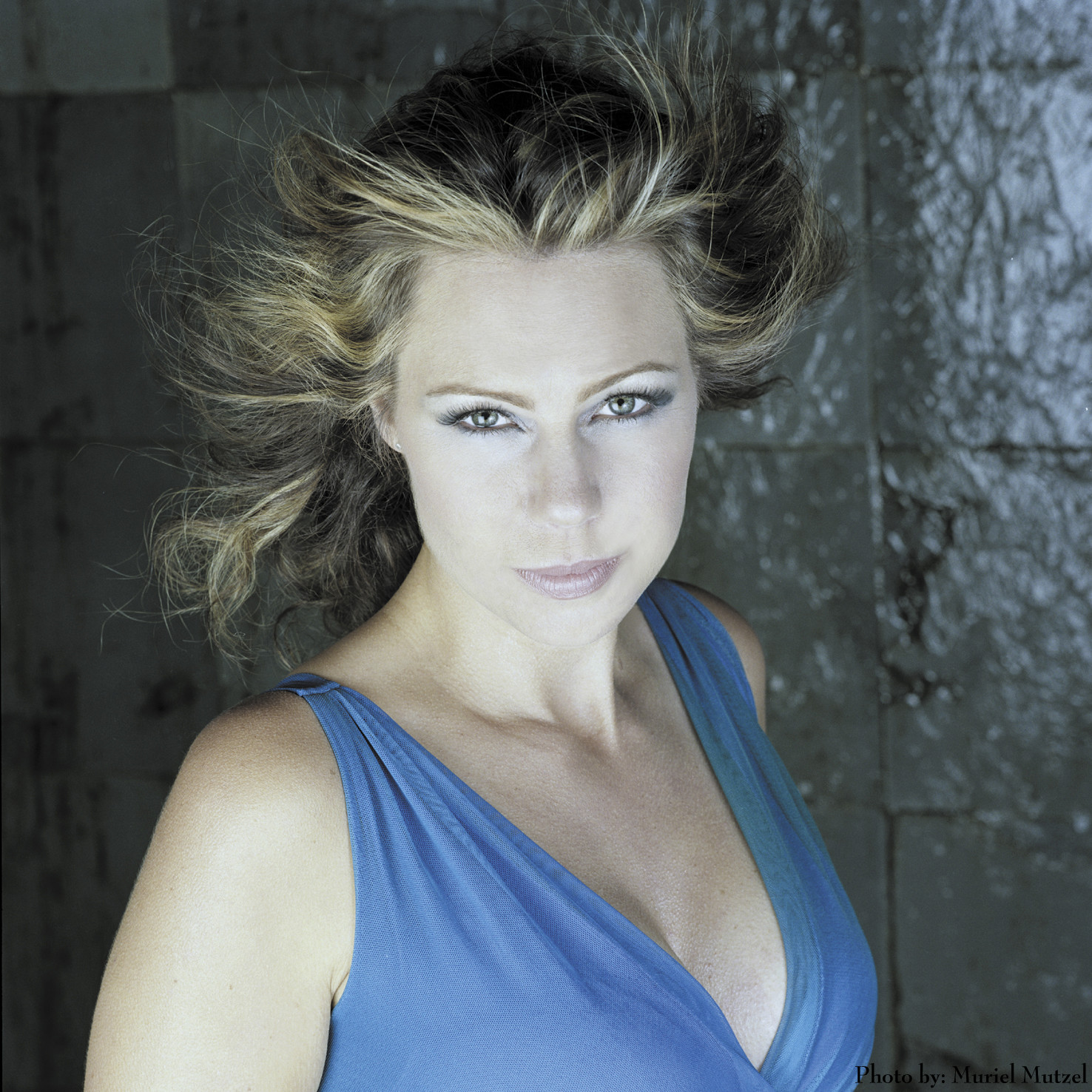
- 2004 press photo

Background information
- Born: November 7, 1970 (age 55); San Francisco, California, United States
- Occupations: Singer, songwriter
- Instrument: Vocals
- Years active: 1988–present
- Labels: Joy Music
- Website: www.trinerein.com

Trine Rein (born November 11, 1970) is an American-Norwegian singer. Her album sales have exceeded one million records.

== Career ==
=== Debut ===
Rein released her first solo album in 1993, Finders, Keepers. It peaked at the top of the Norwegian album chart for five weeks. As she was almost unknown before the release, it took 14 weeks for the album to become the country's most popular album. Due to the extensive foreign press coverage of the Olympic Winter Games in Lillehammer February 1994, her album was soon a hit in Japan as well. At one time she topped 16 different Japanese radio station charts simultaneously. Almost two-thirds of the more than 600,000 albums sold of her first album were bought by Japanese fans.

Rein has released two successful singles. The first was on her debut album, called "Just Missed the Train", and has become Rein's trademark song, exposing her great singing ability. The song has later been covered by child star actress Danielle Brisebois (who wrote the song with Scott Cutler), Estonian Eurovision participant Maarja-Liis Ilus, American Idol winner Kelly Clarkson, and a pre-American Idol Carly Hennessy, among others.

=== Declining sales ===
Rein's second album came in 1996, called Beneath My Skin, and also enjoyed some success; however, it only sold about half as many copies as her debut album. More than 300,000 copies were sold in Norway, Japan, and Denmark; Denmark was a new market for Rein. In its first week, the album went straight to number one on the Norwegian charts. Again a popular single was released in 1996, this time a cover of the alternative rock band Ednaswap's song "Torn".

=== Moving abroad ===
Her third album To Find The Truth was released in 1998, and sold about 100,000 copies. Shortly afterwards, Rein grew tired of the spotlight and sought an anonymous existence abroad for a few years. In 2000, Rein settled permanently in San Francisco and Los Angeles, where she had a variety of odd jobs, including being a limo driver.

She moved back to Norway in 2004 and decided to return to the music scene. Rein starred in a summer television program called 80-tallet beat for beat with three other artists. She also released her first compilation CD, entitled The Very Best of Trine Rein, the same year.

=== Eurovision ambitions ===
Although Rein had stated that she would never participate in the Norwegian final and selection method for the Eurovision Song Contest, Melodi Grand Prix, she accepted Norwegian broadcaster NRK's invitation to participate in 2006. Rein entered the first semi-final in Alta, winning the televote and qualifying for the final at Oslo Spektrum arena. Rein's composition, "Here for the Show", was written by three experienced Swedish producers and songwriters, and was criticized for having similarities to Robbie Williams's "Let Me Entertain You", which the authors also admitted had been their sole inspiration. The song did not win the national final.

She recorded "Time After Time" with the Danish singer Flemming "Bamse" Jørgensen.

=== New album and single in 2010 ===
On May 18, 2010, Rein premiered her first single in twelve years, titled "I Found Love" on her official website; it became available for digital purchase on May 24. Rein's fourth album was called Seeds of Joy, and was released on September 20, 2010.

== Personal life ==
Rein is a vegan and advocate for animal rights. Since July 2015, she has been married to Norwegian adventurer Lars Monsen.

== Discography ==
=== Singles ===
- "Just Missed The Train" (1993) No. 4 in Norway and No. 94 on the Eurochart Hot 100
- "Stay With Me Baby" (1994)
- "Torn" (1996) No. 10 in Norway
- "Do You Really Wanna Leave Me This Way" (1996)
- "The State I'm In" (1996)
- "Never Far Away" (1996)
- "World Without You" (1998)
- "Stars And Angels" (1998)
- "I Found Love" (2010)
- "Når Klokkene Slår" (2011)
- "If You're Next to Me" (2012)
- "Closer" (2014)
- "Den Første Julenatt" (2015)
- "Don't Say It's Over" (2016)
- "Hello It's Me" (2016)
- "Julegaven" (2017)
- "Where Do We Go" (featuring Ole Børud) (2019)

=== Albums ===
- Finders, Keepers (1993) No. 1 in Norway
- Beneath My Skin (1996) No. 1 in Norway
- To Find The Truth (1998) No. 22 in Norway
- Seeds of Joy (September 20, 2010) No. 19 in Norway
- The Well (January 27, 2017)

==== Compilations ====
- The Very Best of Trine Rein (2004)

== See also ==
- Melodi Grand Prix 2006
- Melodi Grand Prix 2007
