= Chicken Creek (South Dakota) =

Stream in South Dakota, U.S.

Coordinates: 44°34′48″N 103°55′57″W

Chicken Creek, alternate name Black Chicken Creek is a stream in the U.S. state of South Dakota.

Some say Chicken Creek received its name for the fact chickens were raised in the area, while others believe pioneers erroneously called partridges, native to the area, chickens.

== See also ==
- List of rivers of South Dakota
