= Torn (song) =

1995 single

Single by Ednaswap

from the album Ednaswap
- Released: 1995
- Length: 4:23
- Label: East West
- Songwriters: Scott Cutler; Anne Preven; Phil Thornalley
- Producers: Scott Cutler; Matt Hyde

Ednaswap singles chronology
"Glow" (1995)	"Torn" (1995)

"Torn" is a song written by Scott Cutler, Anne Preven, and Phil Thornalley in 1991. It is best known as Australian singer Natalie Imbruglia's 1997 debut single, which peaked at number one on the singles charts of Belgium, Canada, Denmark, Iceland, Spain, and Sweden, as well as on three US Billboard charts. Imbruglia's version sold over four million copies worldwide.

In 1993, Danish singer Lis Sørensen released the song in Danish under the title "Brændt" ([pʁænˀt], meaning 'burnt').

Cutler and Preven formed an alternative rock band, Ednaswap, in 1993. Ednaswap gave "Torn" its first formal English-language release in 1995, where it was released as a single from their self-titled debut. Later, in 1996, the first English-language cover, by American-Norwegian singer Trine Rein, was produced and released.

== Early versions ==
"Torn" was written in 1991 by Scott Cutler and Anne Preven with producer Phil Thornalley as a solo song for Preven. Cutler and Preven's band Ednaswap performed it live, but did not initially release a recording.

External videos
- "Brændt" by Lis Sørensen on YouTube
- "Torn" by Trine Rein on YouTube

The first recording of the song was in 1993 by Danish singer Lis Sørensen as "Brændt" ("Burnt"). It was featured on her album Under stjernerne et sted ("Somewhere Below the Stars"), and was also a radio single. It became a hit in Denmark. Sørensen had received the song through music producer Poul Bruun, as a suggestion for inclusion on her new album. The Danish lyrics were written by Elisabeth Gjerluff Nielsen.

Ednaswap released a recorded version in 1995. The song followed the single "Glow" from their self-titled debut album. Thornalley and Cutler produced the session. The band later released several variations and remixes of the song as B-sides and on their album Wacko Magneto.

A version of the song was released in 1996 by American-Norwegian singer Trine Rein and released on her second album, Beneath My Skin (1996). Rein's version reached number 10 on the Norwegian chart. A music video was also produced to promote this version.

== Natalie Imbruglia version ==
"Torn"

Single by Natalie Imbruglia

from the album Left of the Middle
- B-side: "Sometimes"; "Frightened Child"; "Contradictions"; "Diving in the Deep End"
- Released: 27 October 1997
- Studio: Phil Thornalley's studio (West Hampstead, London)
- Genre: Rock; pop; pop rock; alternative pop
- Length: 4:04
- Label: RCA; BMG
- Songwriters: Scott Cutler; Anne Preven; Phil Thornalley
- Producer: Phil Thornalley

Natalie Imbruglia singles chronology
"Torn" (1997)	"Big Mistake" (1998)

Audio sample
- "Torn": file; help

Music video
- "Torn" on YouTube

In 1997, Australian singer and actress Natalie Imbruglia, working with Thornalley, covered the song for her debut studio album, Left of the Middle (1997). Imbruglia's version, based on Trine Rein's version (The "Oh Yeah" adlibs Natalie sings towards the song's end originated on Rein's version) was recorded in Kilburn, London, with David Munday (lead guitar), Thornalley (bass, rhythm guitars), Chuck Sabo (drums), Henry Binns, Sam Hardaker (Zero 7) (drum programming) and Katrina Leskanich (background vocals). It was mixed by Nigel Godrich. Released as a single, Imbruglia's version became a worldwide hit.

Imbruglia received a Grammy Award nomination for Best Female Pop Vocal Performance for the song, which lost to Celine Dion's "My Heart Will Go On". The accompanying music video for "Torn" features British actor Jeremy Sheffield.

Imbruglia also recorded an acoustic version of the song in 2001 for MTV Unplugged. The sheet music for "Torn" is published in the key of F major.

=== Critical reception ===
Larry Flick from Billboard described the song as a "shuffling, acoustic-lined rocker", noting that it "has the rich texture and guitar flavor needed to win the props of rock radio." He added, "However, the song also has an infectious melody that will warm the heart of anyone with a hankering for a slice of pure pop. Imbruglia has a charming, heartfelt delivery mildly reminiscent of Jewel." Scottish newspaper Daily Record commented, "Gorgeous tune from a gorgeous lady". A reviewer from Music & Media stated that "this very convincing debut single" has taken the U.K. charts by storm, "and looks likely to do so elsewhere." Music Week rated it five out of five, picking it as Single of the Week. They wrote, "The former Neighbours star possesses a sweet voice and this song — produced by Nigel Godrich (Radiohead) — has a gentle beauty. Should be huge." The magazine's Alan Jones viewed it as an "excellent single", adding, "A star is reborn."

In 2013, "Torn" was declared the "Best Pop Song" on a top 10 list, part of a larger collection of songs by Q magazine in their special edition 1001 Best Songs Ever issue. In 2013, Billboard ranked "Torn" as the 26th-most successful song of the Pop Songs chart from data compiled between the chart's launch in 1992 and 2012. In 2005, "Torn" was listed at number 383 on Blender magazine's list of "500 Greatest Songs Since You Were Born". In 2025, the song placed 32 in the Triple J Hottest 100 of Australian Songs.

=== Chart performance ===
The physical single of Imbruglia's version of the song has sold more than 4 million copies worldwide, including more than 1 million copies in the UK alone. In the UK, as of 2012 it was the 85th biggest selling single of all time. The track peaked at number two for three weeks, from 2 to 22 November 1997, and then dropped to number four, it broke the airplay record in the UK (more than 2000 plays) for six weeks and was number one for fourteen weeks in the UK radio chart. On 24 September 2007, Natalie Imbruglia's version of the song re-entered the UK Singles Chart at number 70, on the strength of digital sales after her greatest hits album was released. In the Flanders region of Belgium, the single peaked at a number one for 7 consecutive weeks and charted for 22 weeks.

In the United States, the song peaked at number one on the Hot 100 Airplay chart for 11 consecutive weeks. As a result of rules preventing tracks which had not been released as physical singles from charting on the Billboard Hot 100, the song did not chart there during its peak of popularity in the United States. When the song was declining in popularity, the rules changed to allow airplay-only songs onto the chart, and the song charted for 2 weeks, peaking at number 42. In Canada, it peaked at number one on the RPM Top Singles chart for 12 nonconsecutive weeks, from 13 April to 8 June and 22 June to 6 July 1998. It was the most successful single of the year there.

In the Forbes list of the UK's 40 most-played songs of the 2010s, "Torn" was at number 40, and the only 1990s song in the list. It was the 19th-most-played song from 2000 to 2009 in the UK. In 2009, News.com.au reported that it was the most played song on Australian radio since 1990, played more than 300,500 times since its 1997 release, an average of 75 times a day, based on data compiled by the Australian Performing Rights Association (APRA).

=== Music video ===
The music video to Natalie Imbruglia's cover version, filmed on 25 October 1997 under the direction of Alison Maclean, features a shot of an apartment where the angle of vision never changes. Shots of Imbruglia singing along with the song are interspersed with footage of her and British actor Jeremy Sheffield engaging in a romantically inclined conversation. These few scenes turn out to be B-roll footage, as the two actors are seen fumbling their lines and positions; and the director constantly steps into frame to redirect the two. During the last chorus, the apartment walls start wobbling and the crew comes to dismantle it, revealing the location to be a set inside a soundstage. Imbruglia begins to dance during the finishing guitar solo as her "world" crumbles around her.

For unknown reasons, the music video for the song on YouTube is blocked in Latin America (except Mexico and Brazil), Germany, Libya, Egypt, Sudan, the Middle East (except Turkey and Israel), China, Southeast Asia (except Vietnam) and New Zealand.

=== David Armand ===
The song was pantomimed by David Armand for a 2005 HBO broadcast which spread on the internet. This popularity of the "Karaoke for the Deaf" performance by Armand as Johan Lippowitz resulted in the 2006 live performance (Amnesty International's Secret Policeman's Ball) with Imbruglia where she sings "Torn" and then joins into the "interpretive dance" pantomime featuring both Armand and Imbruglia acting out the words of the song.

=== Track listings ===
Australian CD single and UK CD1

No.	Title	Writer(s)	Length
1.	"Torn"	Scott Cutler; Anne Preven; Phil Thornalley	4:06
2.	"Sometimes" (incorrectly lists length on sleeve as 5:51)	Natalie Imbruglia; Rick Palombi; Nick Trevisik	3:52
3.	"Frightened Child"	Imbruglia; Dave Munday; Thornalley	1:56

UK CD2 (withdrawn a day after release)

No.	Title	Writer(s)	Length
1.	"Torn"	Cutler; Preven; Thornalley	4:06
2.	"Contradictions"	Imbruglia; Palombi; Trevisik	4:07
3.	"Diving in the Deep End" (ending cut short)	Imbruglia; Thornalley	3:30

UK cassette single

No.	Title	Writer(s)	Length
1.	"Torn"	Cutler; Preven; Thornalley	4:06
2.	"Sometimes" (length incorrectly listed on sleeve as 5:51)	Imbruglia; Palombi; Trevisik	3:52

European CD single

No.	Title	Writer(s)	Length
1.	"Torn"	Cutler; Preven; Thornalley	4:06
2.	"Diving in the Deep End"	Imbruglia; Thornalley	3:54

=== Personnel ===
Personnel are taken from Music Musings and Such. Additional instruments behind the song are shown from Sound on Sound.

- Natalie Imbruglia – vocals, background vocals
- Katrina Leskanich – background vocals
- Phil Thornalley – acoustic guitar, electric guitar, piano, synthesizer, programming, bass
- David Munday – lead guitar, slide guitar
- Chuck Sabo – shaker, tambourine, drums
- Zero 7 – drum programming
- Nigel Godrich - mixing

=== Charts ===
==== Weekly charts ====
Chart (1997–1998)	Peak position
Australia (ARIA)	2
Austria (Ö3 Austria Top 40)	3
Belgium (Ultratop 50 Flanders)	1
Belgium (Ultratop 50 Wallonia)	5
Canada Top Singles (RPM)	1
Canada Adult Contemporary (RPM)	1
Canada Rock/Alternative (RPM)	6
Croatia (HRT)	5
Denmark (IFPI)	1
Estonia (Eesti Top 20)	7
Europe (European Hot 100 Singles)	2
Finland (Suomen virallinen lista)	8
France (SNEP)	4
Germany (GfK)	4
Greece (IFPI)	4
Hungary (Mahasz)	6
Iceland (Íslenski Listinn Topp 40)	1
Ireland (IRMA)	4
Italy (Musica e dischi)	3
Italy Airplay (Music & Media)	1
Netherlands (Dutch Top 40)	2
Netherlands (Single Top 100)	3
New Zealand (Recorded Music NZ)	5
Norway (VG-lista)	6
Scottish Singles Sales (Official Charts)	2
Spain (AFYVE)	1
Sweden (Sverigetopplistan)	1
Switzerland (Schweizer Hitparade)	2
UK Singles (Official Charts)	2
US Billboard Hot 100	42
US Radio Songs (Billboard)	1
US Adult Contemporary (Billboard)	4
US Adult Pop Airplay (Billboard)	1
US Modern Rock Tracks (Billboard)	12
US Pop Airplay (Billboard)	1

Chart (2013)	Peak position
Slovenia Airplay (SloTop50)	28

Chart (2021–2025)	Peak position
Australia Artist On Replay (ARIA)	21
Estonia Airplay (TopHit)	92
Poland Airplay (ZPAV)	58

==== Year-end charts ====
Chart (1997)	Position
Sweden (Topplistan)	67
UK Singles (OCC)	8

Chart (1998)	Position
Australia (ARIA)	37
Austria (Ö3 Austria Top 40)	26
Belgium (Ultratop 50 Flanders)	6
Belgium (Ultratop 50 Wallonia)	23
Canada Top Singles (RPM)	1
Canada Adult Contemporary (RPM)	3
Europe (European Hot 100 Singles)	6
France (SNEP)	18
Germany (Media Control)	24
Iceland (Íslenski Listinn Topp 40)	12
Netherlands (Dutch Top 40)	15
Netherlands (Single Top 100)	9
Sweden (Hitlistan)	15
Switzerland (Schweizer Hitparade)	7
UK Singles (OCC)	117
US Hot 100 Airplay (Billboard)	2
US Adult Contemporary (Billboard)	10
US Adult Top 40 (Billboard)	1
US Mainstream Top 40 (Billboard)	2
US Modern Rock Tracks (Billboard)	34
US Rhythmic Top 40 (Billboard)	72
US Triple-A (Billboard)	8

Chart (1999)	Position
UK Airplay Top 50 (Music Week)	50
US Adult Contemporary (Billboard)	40
US Adult Top 40 (Billboard)	48

Year-end chart performance
Chart (2025)	Position
Argentina Anglo Airplay (Monitor Latino)	72
Estonia Airplay (TopHit)	165

==== All-time charts ====
Chart	Position
Australia's Most Played Song as of 2009	1
UK Most Played Songs 2000–2009	19
UK Most Played Songs 2010–2019	40
UK Singles (OCC)	89
US Pop Songs (Billboard)	26

=== Certifications ===
Region	Certification	Certified units/sales
Australia (ARIA)	Platinum	70,000^{^}
Belgium (BRMA)	Platinum	50,000^{*}
Denmark (IFPI Danmark)	Platinum	90,000^{‡}
France (SNEP)	Gold	250,000^{*}
Germany (BVMI)	Gold	250,000^{^}
Italy (FIMI)	Platinum	100,000^{‡}
Netherlands (NVPI)	Gold	50,000^{^}
New Zealand (RMNZ)	3× Platinum	90,000^{‡}
Norway (IFPI Norway)	Gold	
Spain (Promusicae)	2× Platinum	120,000^{‡}
Sweden (GLF)	Platinum	30,000^{^}
Switzerland (IFPI Switzerland)	Gold	25,000^{^}
United Kingdom (BPI)	4× Platinum	2,400,000^{‡}
^{*} Sales figures based on certification alone.^{^} Shipments figures based on certification alone.^{‡} Sales+streaming figures based on certification alone.

=== Release history ===
Region	Date	Format(s)	Label(s)	Ref.
United Kingdom	27 October 1997	CD; cassette	RCA; BMG	
Europe	17 November 1997	CD	RCA; BMG	
Sweden	1 December 1997	CD	RCA; BMG	
United States	2 February 1998	Modern rock radio	RCA	
United States	3 February 1998	Contemporary hit radio	RCA	
Japan	21 February 1998	CD	RCA; BMG	

== Rouge version ==
"O Amor é Ilusão"

Single by Rouge

from the album Mil e Uma Noites
- Released: September 27, 2005
- Recorded: 2002
- Genre: Pop rock
- Length: 4:06
- Label: Columbia; Sony BMG
- Songwriters: Scott Cutler; Anne Preven; Phil Thornalley; Rick Bonadio
- Producer: Rick Bonadio

Rouge singles chronology
"Vem Habib (Wala Wala)" (2005)	"O Amor é Ilusão" (2005)	"Bailando" (2018)

In 2005, Brazilian girl group Rouge recorded a Portuguese version of the song, titled "O Amor é Ilusão" (lit.: "Love is an illusion"), included in the group's 2005 fourth studio album Mil e Uma Noites. It was the album's second and last single, and their last overall until "Bailando" in 2018.

The lyrics were written by Milton Guedes, who co-wrote their hits "Não Dá pra Resistir", "Beijo Molhado", and others, with production by Rick Bonadio.

=== Background ===
After three studio albums, their record label Sony BMG demanded a compilation album, against the band members' wishes. At the time, rumors of their breakup circulated in the press, and they felt a new release would help dispel those allegations. Mil e Uma Noites was eventually released as a compromise, with most tracks being previously released hits, plus six all-new tracks.

As always, the album featured songs originally in English rewritten for Portuguese, including "Torn". After the success of the album's first single "Vem Habib (Wala Wala)", "O Amor é Ilusão" was announced as the follow-up and released in late September.

This version keeps most of the original's lyrical themes, about a lost love who gradually drifts away from the narrator.

=== Charts ===
Chart (2005)	Peak position
Brazil (Brasil Hot 100 Airplay)	23

== In popular culture ==
The song appeared in several television series, the most prominent of which being the American TV series Charmed, in the episode "I've Got You Under My Skin". Imbruglia's version of the song appeared in other shows as well; examples include the Chilean soap opera Separados (broadcast by TVN), the Turkish teen drama Love 101 (broadcast and distributed by Netflix), and the Philippine TV series Gimik (aired by ABS-CBN).

In 2010, British-Irish boyband One Direction sang an acoustic version of "Torn" for their first performance as a group on The X Factor. The group would perform the song again in November 2015 on BBC Radio 1's Live Lounge, this time as a quartet following Zayn Malik's departure earlier in the year.

In 2014, the song was covered by Hand Like Houses on Pop Goes Punk Vol. 2.

In 2018, Welsh pop punk band Neck Deep covered the song, with an accompanying music video released by California-based indie record label Hopeless Records that parodies Natalie Imbruglia's 1997 video.

In 2018-2019, the cast of the Broadway musical Moulin Rouge! recorded an updated version of the "Elephant Love Medley" from the original film. The updated version includes the "I'm all out of faith" verse from "Torn".

In a 2019 Saturday Night Live sketch, Ben Stiller, impersonating Michael Cohen testifying to Congress during the Stormy Daniels-Donald Trump scandal, recited the chorus of the song as part of an opening statement.

In 2021, Canadian country pop artist MacKenzie Porter released a cover of the song.
