= Scott Cutler =

American songwriter

- Born: Scott Michael Cutler; Chicago, Illinois
- Origin: United States
- Genres: Pop, alternative
- Occupations: Music executive, record producer, songwriter, musician
- Instrument: Guitar
- Label: Pulse Recording
- Formerly of: Ednaswap
- Website: pulserecordings.com

Scott Cutler is an American songwriter, musician, record producer, and music executive. As a member of the alternative rock band Ednaswap, he co-wrote "Torn" which was covered in 1997 by Natalie Imbruglia. Her recording became the worldwide number one airplay song, and spent 14 weeks on the Billboard Hot 100 Airplay Chart in the US. "Torn" has sold an estimated four million copies, it is certified Platinum in 3 countries, and was declared the "number one radio single of the 1990s" by radio personality Rick Dees. Ednaswap released three albums between 1995 and 1998 and toured with No Doubt, Weezer, and Better Than Ezra

As a songwriter and producer, he has collaborated with some of the music industry's top female artists including Madonna, Beyoncé, Katy Perry, Sinéad O'Connor, Miley Cyrus, Kelly Clarkson, Demi Lovato, and Jordin Sparks. He co-wrote "Piano in the Dark" with singer/songwriter Brenda Russell which was nominated for Song of the Year at the 31st Annual Grammy Awards. In 2007, he won the Critic's Choice Award for Best Song for "Listen" from the motion picture adaption of Dreamgirls. The song was also nominated for Best Original Song at the 2007 Academy Awards and the 2007 Golden Globe Awards.

== Pulse Recording ==
In 2007, Cutler created the music publisher Songs of Pulse with writer/producers Josh Abraham and Anne Preven. The company, along with Pulse Management, operates under the Pulse Recording umbrella, to which he became a partner in 2010. Pulse Recording's client roster has co-written Katy Perry's "Teenage Dream", "California Gurls", "Last Friday Night (T.G.I.F.)" and "Part of Me", Taio Cruz's "Dynamite" Phillip Phillips' "Home" and Neon Trees' "Animal" and "Everybody Talks". Pulse Recording operates two Recording studios, one based at its headquarters in Los Angeles, and one based in Burbank, California. Also in 2009, he worked with Irish pop band Westlife for a track "The Difference" included in their Where We Are album where it charted #2 in both UK Albums Chart and Irish Albums Chart. In 2012, the company established a partnership with Creative Nation, the Nashville-based music management and publishing company owned by songwriter Luke Laird and his with Beth Laird.

== Discography ==
Title	Album details
Ednaswap	Released: May 9, 1995; Label: EastWest / Atlantic Records
Wacko Magneto	Released: March 4, 1997; Label: Island Records
Wonderland Park	Released: August 18, 1998; Label: Island Records

== Awards and nominations ==
Grammy Awards

- Song of the Year ("Piano in the Dark") (Nominee)

Broadcast Film Critics Association Award

- Best Song ("Listen") (Winner)

Academy Award

- Best Song ("Listen") (Nominee)

Golden Globe Award

- Best Song ("Listen") (Nominee)

Black Reel Awards

- Best Song ("Listen") (Nominee)

Satellite Award

- Best Original Song ("Listen") (Nominee)
