= Chicken Creek (South Carolina) =

Stream in Berkeley County, South Carolina, U.S.

Coordinates: 33°02′21″N 79°57′16″W

Chicken Creek is a stream in Berkeley County, South Carolina, in the United States.

Chicken Creek was named for the Chicken family who settled there.

== See also ==
- List of rivers of South Carolina
