= Dixie Chicken (bar) =

Bar in College Station, Texas

Coordinates: 30.617815°N 96.346304°W

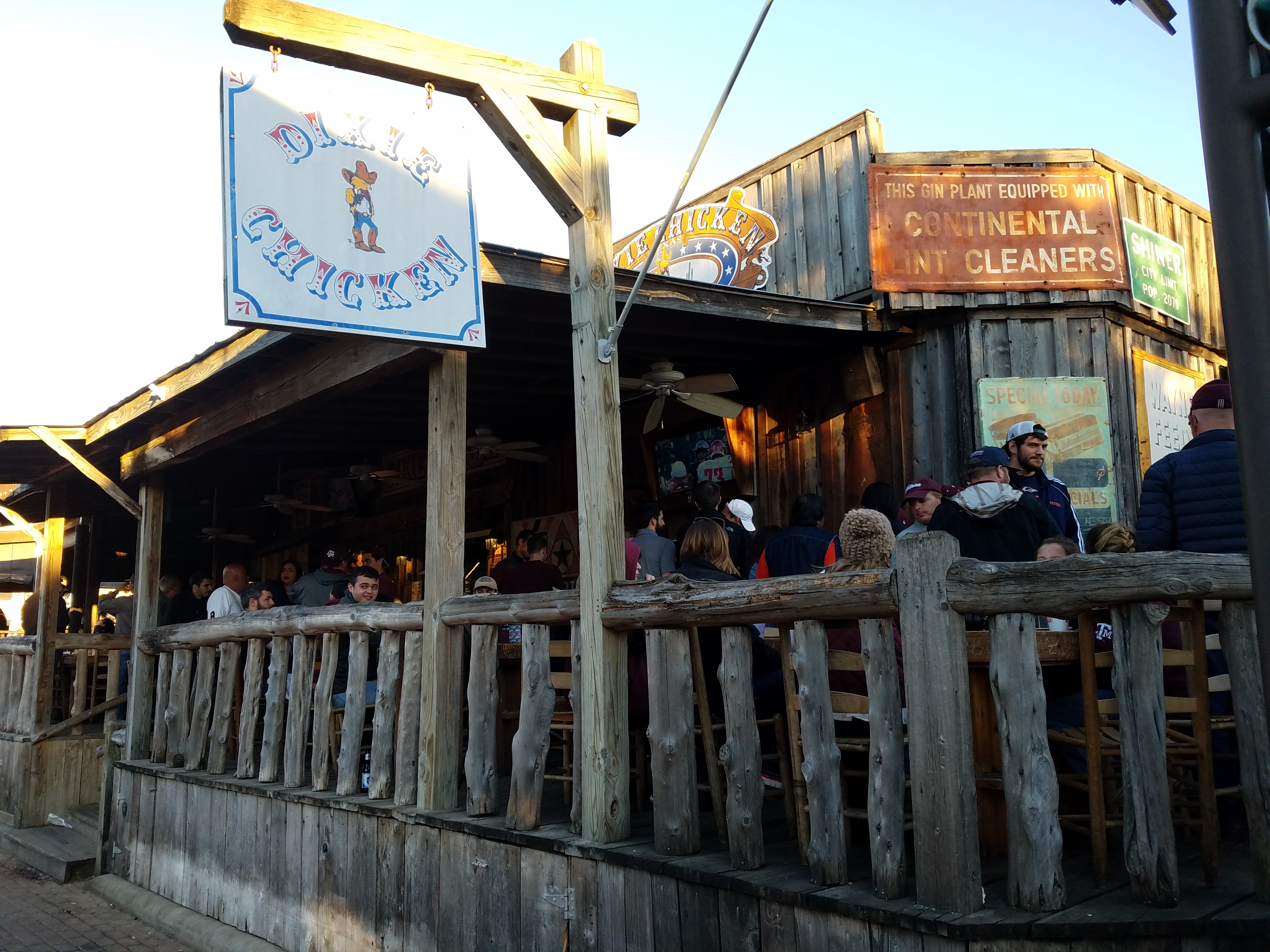
Dixie Chicken back porch

The Dixie Chicken, also known as The Chicken, is a bar located in College Station, Texas, directly across the street from the Texas A&M University campus. The Dixie Chicken claims to serve the most beer per square foot of any bar in the United States.

“One of the most recognizable restaurants in College Station,” the Dixie Chicken is known as Texas A&M's "favorite local watering hole." The Dixie Chicken is the oldest and most famous bar in the Northgate district.

The Dixie Chicken was founded by local businessmen Don Anz and Don Ganter. Anz had rented a pool hall, the Aggie Den, directly across the street from the Texas A&M University campus. The two businessmen invested about $7,000 to convert the pool hall into a bar. The two renamed the facility the Dixie Chicken, taken from the album of the same name by band Little Feat. The decor was inspired by the cover of a Jerry Jeff Walker album, and featured swinging doors at the entrance, sturdy wooden tables - over time covered in patron's carvings - pool tables, dominoes, and signs on the walls. In a 2014 article, ESPN writer Scott Eden described the bar: "The exterior resembles a honky-tonk as dreamed up by the Disney people who designed Frontierland. On the inside, it's pure Texas, with outlaw country on an infinite loop and Lone Star longnecks sliding down the bars, not to mention photos of old Bonfires all over the walls."

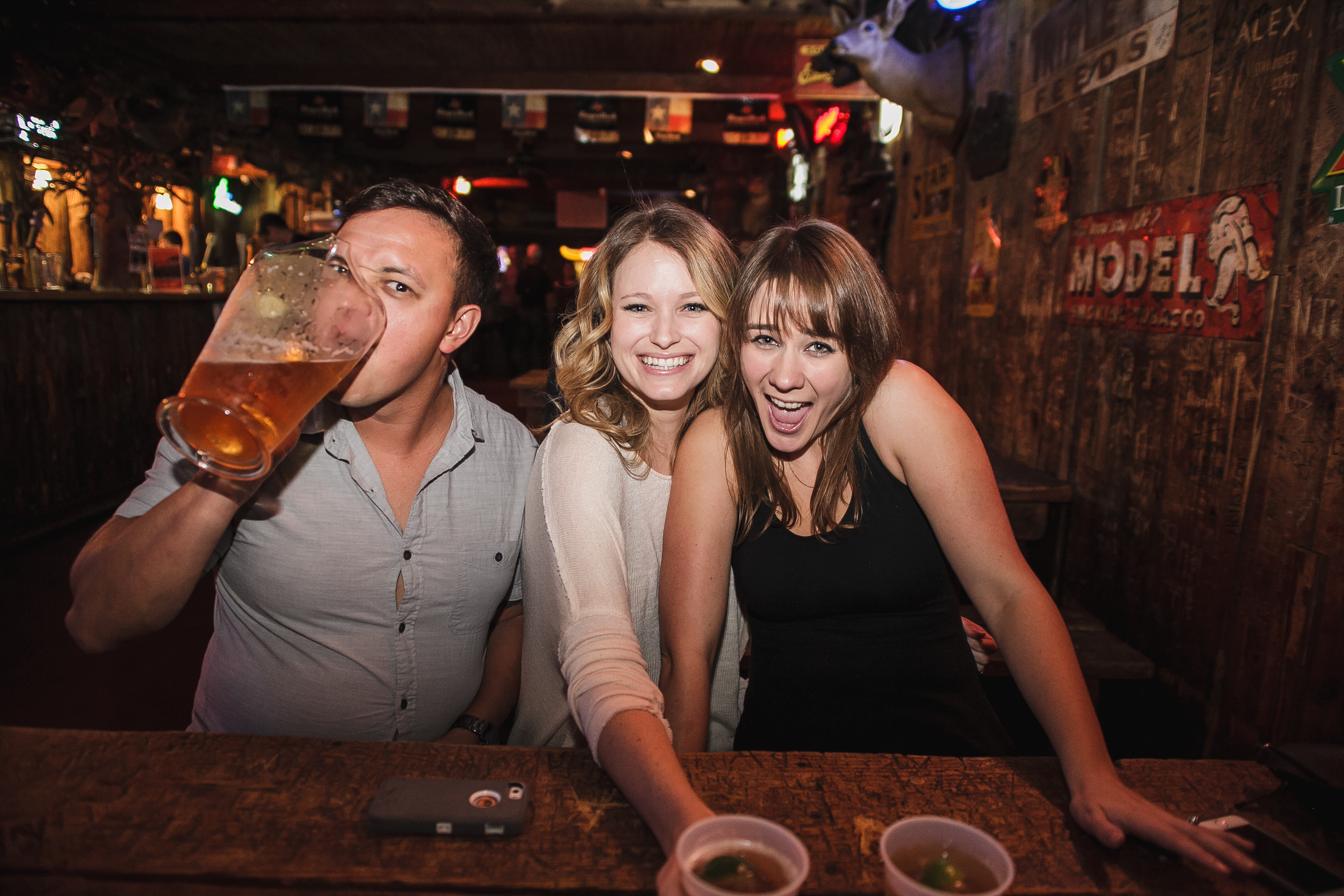
A group of friends pose with a pitcher of beer.

The bar opened on June 15, 1974. It soon became a favored hangout of Texas A&M students and aspiring singers Robert Earl Keen and Lyle Lovett. The two often brought their guitars to the bar and played impromptu concerts on the back porch. In the beginning, they were often kicked out of the bar, but as their playing improved, the owners allowed them to stay and play.

The bar was the inspiration for the unofficial Texas A&M Tradition of "ring dunking". In the late 1970s a student dropped his brand-new Aggie ring in a pitcher of beer. He was challenged by a friend to drink the pitcher to retrieve the ring. This spread to become a widespread practice among Texas A&M seniors. Due to changes in Texas laws, by 2005 instead of pitchers, students are only allowed to buy 32 ounce (950 mL) mugs of beer on Ring Day at the Dixie Chicken.

The Dixie Chicken was expanded in 1981, and in the mid-2000s an additional porch was added. The decor has changed only minimally. Ganter died in 2004, just days after the Dixie Chicken had its 30th anniversary. His daughters, Katy Jackson and Jennifer Ganter, now run the bar. In 2014, the Dixie Chicken celebrated its 40th anniversary, making it the oldest bar in the Northgate, Texas entertainment district in College Station.

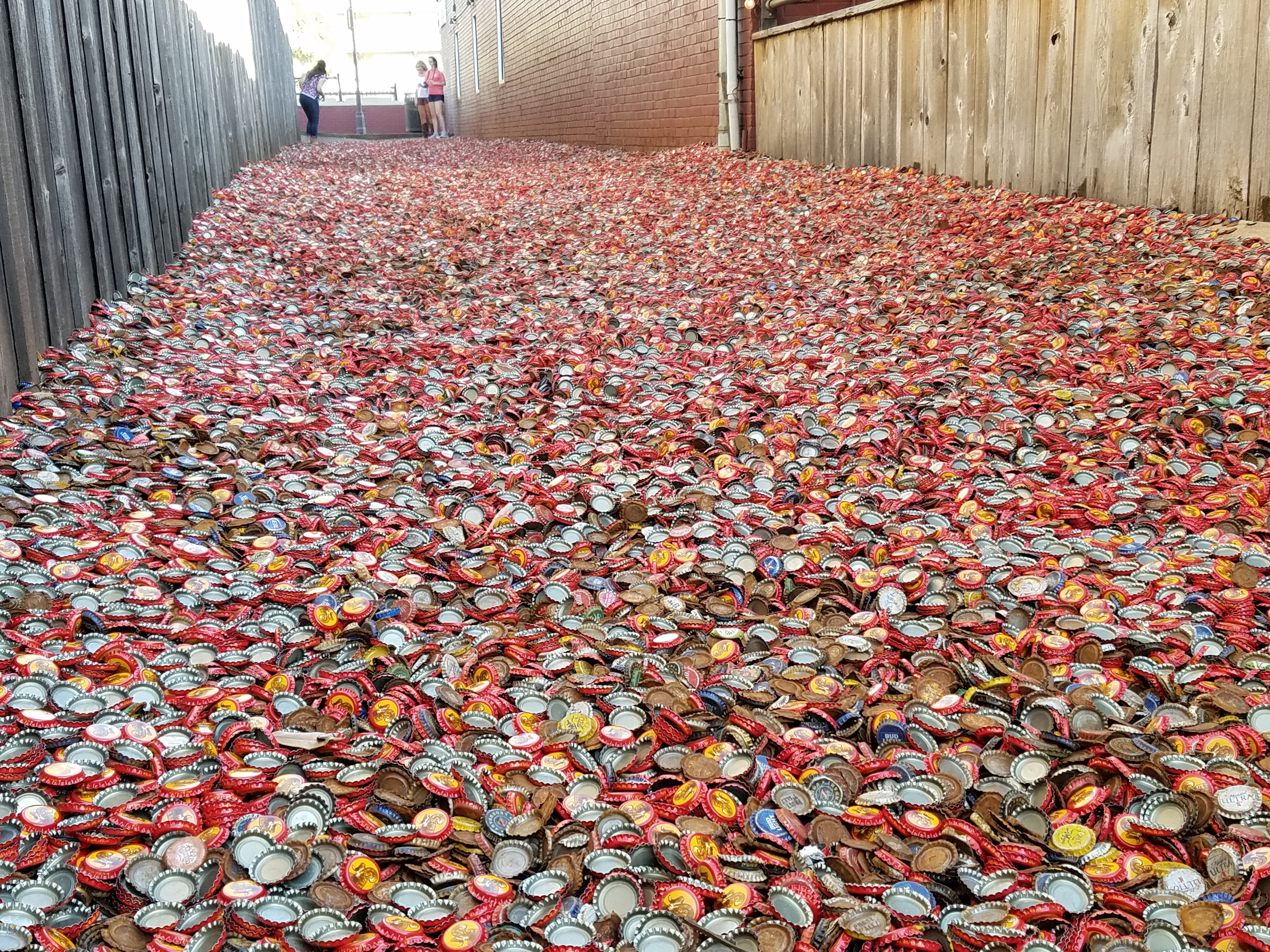
For Texas Independence Day 2017, Shiner Bock donated hundreds of thousands of caps to Bottle Cap Alley. For the day, it was called "Bock Cap Alley" throughout social media.

In April 2006, the Dixie Chicken was named "College Bar of the Month" in Playboy. Complex.com named it the Number 1 Best College Campus Bars in 2013. Notable customers have included United States Senator John McCain and the former president of Panama, Martín Torrijos. In his comments to the Texas A&M graduating class of Fall 2008, President George W. Bush stated that, "Back in my day, I think I would have enjoyed dunk [sic] my ring." The president also joked about the absence of his Secretary of Defense (and former president of A&M) Robert Gates from the ceremony by stating, "It's not like he's over at the Dixie Chicken.”

Bottle Cap Alley separates the Chicken from the Dry Bean Saloon. In the early days of the bar, the workers would have so many bottle caps from all the bottled beer that was served throughout the day that they started putting them up and down the alley. Today it's a landmark that encourages visitors to bring and dump their own bottle caps to be a part of the tradition. In recent years, with more people buying beer by the pitcher, different beer companies have contributed their caps to make sure the alley stays beautiful year around. On the night of May 27, 2020, heavy rain and hail caused the roof of the Chicken to cave in. The damage to the roof has since been repaired and the Chicken has resumed normal operations.

The Dixie Chicken celebrated its 50th Anniversary on June 14, 2024. A live concert was held, featuring prominent musicians who attended Texas A&M, and hundreds of people gathered at the Chicken and in the adjacent Northgate plaza to celebrate the occasion.
