= Benji Boko =

- Born: Benjamin Gordon; 5 October 1986 (age 39)
- Origin: Brighton, Sussex, England
- Genres: Electronic, Alternative, Hip hop
- Instruments: Ableton Live, Serato, Akai MPC, Korg Kaoss Pad, Korg Padkontrol, Behringer bcf2000
- Years active: 2008–present
- Label: Tru Thoughts
- Website: iambenji.co.uk

Benjamin Gordon (born 5 October 1986), known professionally as Benji Boko, is an English DJ and producer.

== Early life and career ==
Benji Boko grew up in Brighton, East Sussex. He first became interested in remixing from a young age when he stored TV theme tunes on his computer and tried to mix them into each other. Hearing DJ Yoda for the first time inspired him to improve his style of mixing. When he was 18, Benji bought his first turntables and began mixing at friend's house parties in Brighton.

In 2008 Benji Boko moved to Leeds to attend Leeds College of Music graduating with a BA(Hons) in Music Production. He managed to get a regular DJ slot at HIFI in Leeds. He played there for three years where he continued to experiment and improve his live mixing ability. In 2011 he graduated from Leeds College of Music and returned to Brighton where he used what he learnt in his three years in Leeds and continued to perform as a DJ.

Late 2010 saw Benji Boko sign to the independent Brighton based label Tru Thoughts. After being signed to Tru-Thoughts, Benji Boko played a midnight slot to 17,000 people at the London O2 Arena for a New Year's Eve party. Here he played alongside Deadmau5, Justice and Calvin Harris. This performance grabbed the attention of Zane Lowe who said "what Benji does live is really fun and unique".

== Beats, Treats & All Things Unique ==
Benji Boko released his debut album, Beats, Treats & All Things Unique, on Tru-Thoughts in June 2011. This album saw Benji collaborate with Maxi Jazz of Faithless and Ricky Rankin of Roots Manuva. The album was reviewed by BBC Music stating "Boko expressed an impressive breadth of imagination when it comes to trying out different genres and ideas".

== Releases and remixes ==
When Benji Boko is not performing live shows, he is mixing and remixing material. He has created a catalogue of remixes for many different artists such as Roots Manuva, Fatboy Slim, Chiddy Bang, Rizzle Kicks, Kidda, Pixie Lott, Beardyman, Nelly Furtado, Little Dragon and more. The remix he did for Little Dragon has been one of his most successful remixes reaching number 4 on the worldwide hypemachine charts last year.

== Festivals and live performances ==
Benji Boko is known for his live mixing, which he describes as "Completely improvised, off the cuff, live remixing". His live shows has gained him critical acclaim from many other DJs such as DJ Yoda and Rob da Bank. Since 2010 Benji Boko has become a regular on the UK festival scene playing shows at Bestival, Glastonbury, V Festival, Secret Garden Party.

== Viral video ==
In late 2012 Benji Boko performed an impromptu rave at Piccadilly Circus. It was similar to a flash mob where a van pulled up and a crew pulled out the equipment and set it up on the steps of the Shaftesbury memorial fountain. The stunt was filmed for a promotional video titled Piccadilly Rave, and can be seen on YouTube.

== Discography ==
=== Singles and EPs ===
TRACK TITLE	RECORD LABEL	RELEASE DATE
The Jungle V.I.P.	Wax on Records	29 April 2008
Kudos	Wax on Records	29 April 2008
Take A Look Around You (Benji Boko Remix)	Wax on Records	9 July 2008
Perhaps (Original Mix)	Wax on Records	5 May 2009
Beautiful feat. Yarah Bravo (Benji Boko Remix) – DJ Vadim & The Electric	OGS	5 December 2010
Glider (Original Mix) – Benji Boko	Tru Thoughts	23 May 2011
Where My Heart Is feat. Maxi Jazz (Original Mix) – Benji Boko	Tru Thoughts	23 May 2011
Toot Toot (Benji Boko Remix) – DJ Vadim & The Electric	OGS	5 June 2011
Moo Juice (Benji Boko & BOY COM Remix Vocal) – Renegades of Jazz	Muto	27 June 2011
Moo Juice (Benji Boko & BOY COM Remix Dub) – Renegades of Jazz	Muto	27 June 2011
Wanna Be Loved (Benji Boko Remix) – Kidda	Skint Records	25 July 2011
Glider (Original Mix) – Benji Boko	Tru Thoughts	10 October 2011
Cheating With You (Benji Boko Remix) – The Correspondents	The Correspondents	7 November 2011
What Do You Take Me For (Benji Boko Remix) – Pixie Lott	Mercury Records LTD.	11 November 2011
No.1 Sound	Tru Thoughts	23 April 2012
One More Night (Benji Boko Remix) – Maroon 5	A&M/Octone Records	26 October 2012

=== Albums ===
ALBUM TITLE	RECORD LABEL	RELEASE DATE
Beats, Treats & All Things Unique	Tru Thoughts	20 June 2011
