= Wacko Magneto =

Studio album by Ednaswap
- Released: March 4, 1997
- Recorded: 1996
- Genres: Alternative rock, noise rock, alternative metal
- Length: 52:59
- Label: Island
- Producer: Dave Jerden

Ednaswap chronology
Ednaswap (1995)	Wacko Magneto (1997)	Wonderland Park (1998)

Professional ratings
Review scores
Source	Rating
Allmusic	4/5 stars

Wacko Magneto was the second album of Los Angeles band Ednaswap. It was their first full-length album to be put into wide release and, based on sales records, was very popular in Los Angeles and New York.

Wacko Magneto's debut encountered many setbacks; the most well-known was when Natalie Imbruglia covered the band's signature song "Torn". "Torn" was planned to be Wacko Magneto's second single, after "Clown Show"; however, Imbruglia's release came just before Ednaswap's and its success precluded any chance for the band to release their own version.

Wacko Magneto's debut encountered other setbacks as well. It was released while Ednaswap's label, Island, was going through a troubled time, reorganizing staff and cutting artists that weren't considered successful enough.

Ednaswap was kept on the label, and went on to record one more studio album, Wonderland Park. One video for the album was filmed, "Clown Show", and played on MTV's 120 Minutes for its debut.

Copies of this album were originally released with a ball bearing in the jewel case, to emphasize the 'pinball' motif artwork.

== Track listing ==
1. "Stop Counting" – 4:16
2. "Clown Show" – 4:44
3. "Chordomatic" – 3:28
4. "Sideways Out the Window" – 4:09
5. "All Time Low" – 3:19
6. "More" – 5:27
7. "Silver Hill" – 3:31
8. "Pale" – 3:45
9. "YDWIBE" – 2:24
10. "Torn" – 3:58
11. "Shrapnel" – 2:59
12. "Claustrophobic" – 7:30
13. "Violin Song" – 3:29
